= Allison T56 =

American-built military turboprop (1954–)

T56 / Model 501
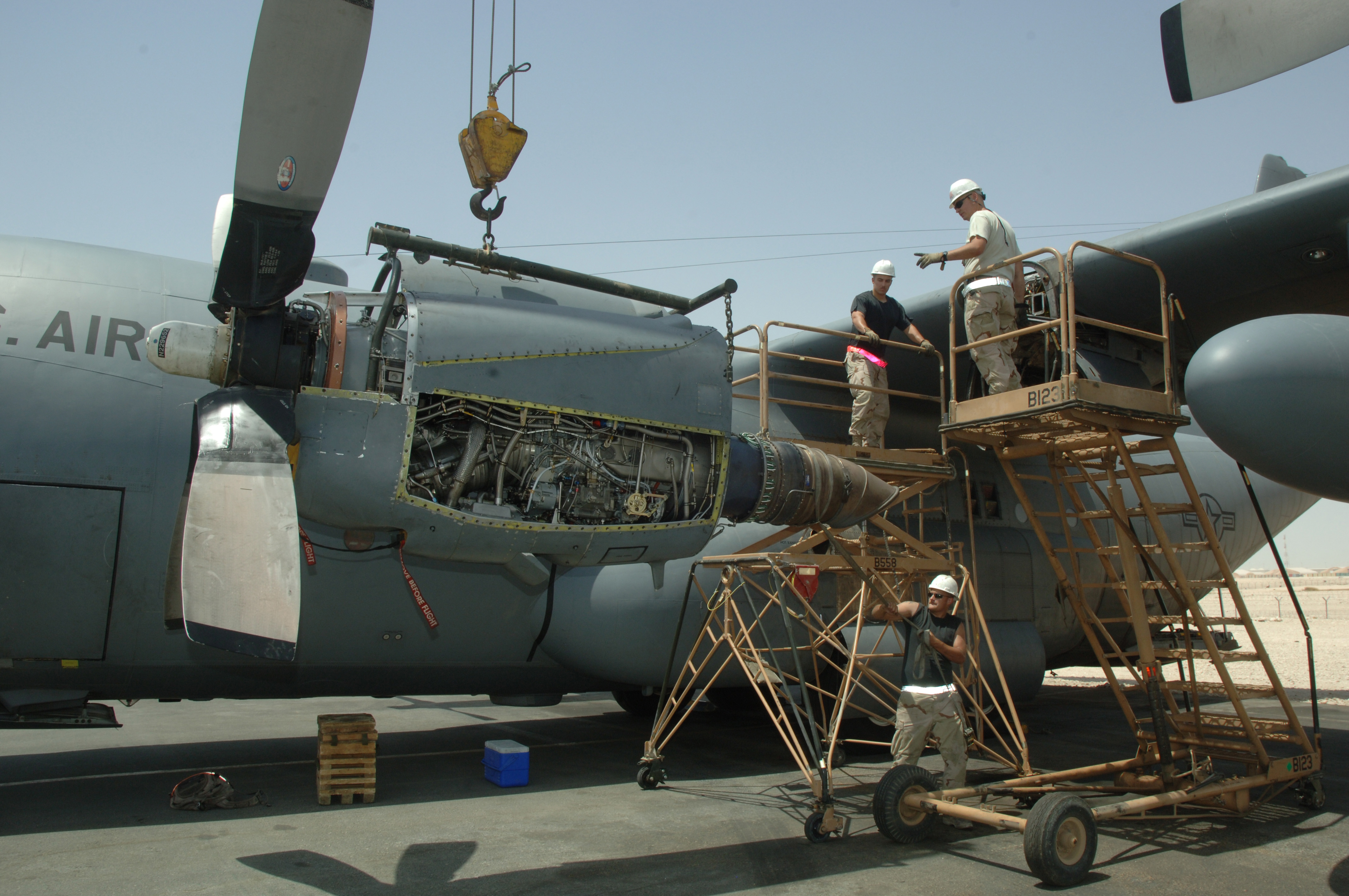
- A T56 mounted on a U.S. Air Force C-130 Hercules receives maintenance.
- Type: Turboprop
- National origin: United States
- Manufacturer: Allison Engine Company; Rolls-Royce plc
- Major applications: Convair 580; Grumman C-2 Greyhound; Lockheed C-130 Hercules; Lockheed L-188 Electra; Lockheed P-3 Orion; Aero Spacelines Super Guppy; Northrop Grumman E-2 Hawkeye; Lockheed CP-140 Aurora
- Number built: >18,000
- Developed from: Allison T38
- Developed into: Rolls-Royce T406

The Allison T56 is an American single-shaft, modular design military turboprop with a 14-stage axial flow compressor driven by a four-stage turbine. It was originally developed by the Allison Engine Company for the Lockheed C-130 Hercules transport entering production in 1954. It has been a Rolls-Royce product since 1995 when Allison was acquired by Rolls-Royce. The commercial version is designated 501-D. Over 18,000 engines have been produced since 1954, logging over 200 million flying hours.

== Design and development ==
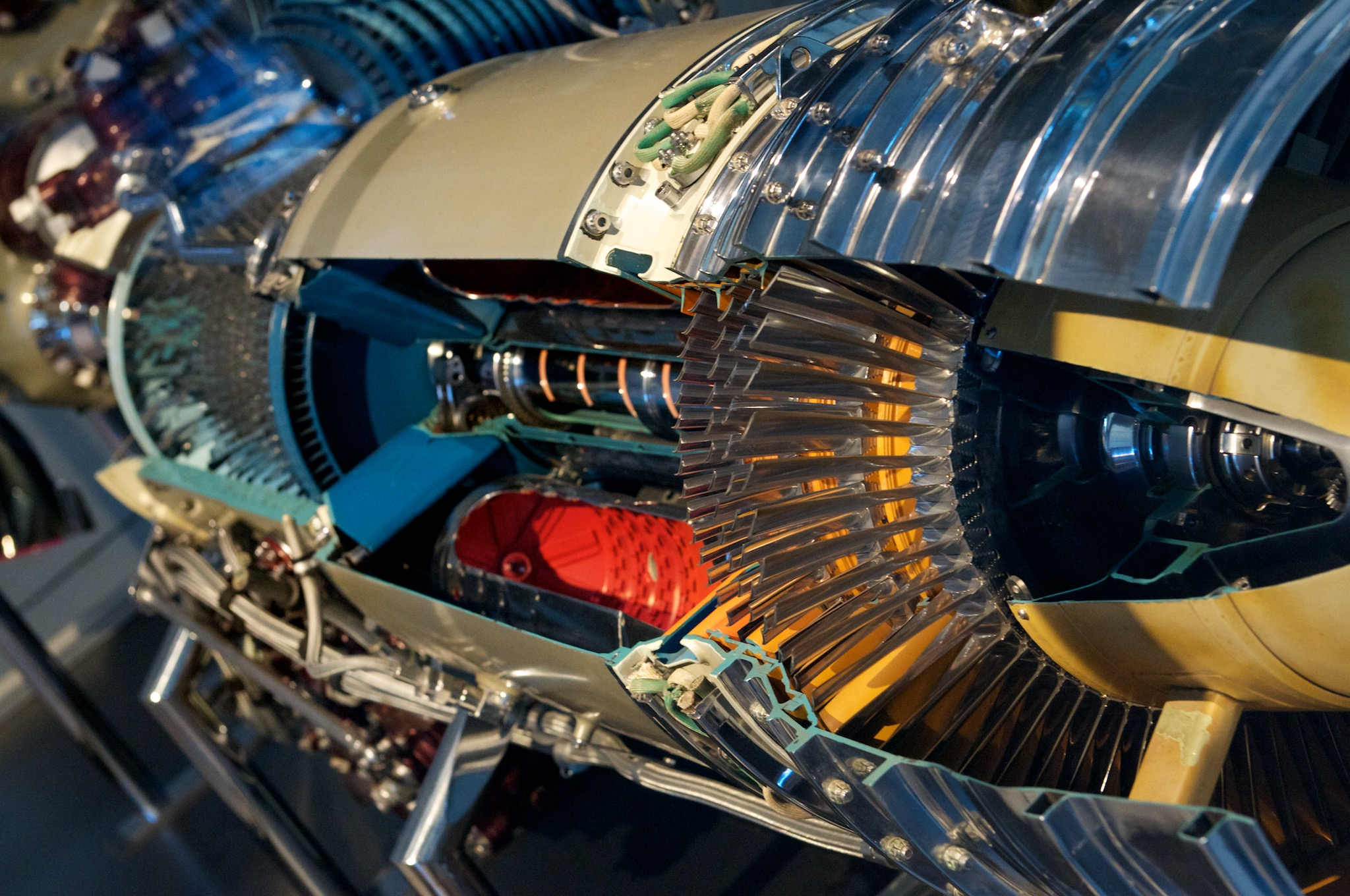
Allison T56-A1 turboprop engine cutaway, at the Smithsonian National Air and Space Museum

The T56 turboprop, evolved from Allison's previous T38 series, was first flown in the nose of a B-17 test-bed aircraft in 1954. One of the first flight-cleared YT-56 engines was installed in a C-130 nacelle on Lockheed's Super Constellation test aircraft in early 1954. Originally fitted to the Lockheed C-130 Hercules military transport aircraft, the T56 was also installed on the Lockheed P-3 Orion maritime patrol aircraft (MPA), Grumman E-2 Hawkeye airborne early warning (AEW) aircraft, and Grumman C-2 Greyhound carrier onboard delivery (COD) aircraft, as well as civilian airliners such as the Lockheed Electra and the Convair 580.

The T56-A-1 delivered to Lockheed in May, 1953, produced only 3,000 shp (2,237 kW), compared to the required 3,750 shp (2,796 kW) for the YC-130A. Evolution of the T56 has been achieved through increases in pressure ratio and turbine temperature. The T56-A-14 installed on the P-3 Orion has a 4,591 shp (3,424 kW) rating with a pressure ratio of 9.25:1 while the T56-A-427 fitted to the E-2 Hawkeye has a 5,250 shp (3,915 kW) rating and a 12:1 pressure ratio. In addition, the T56 produces approximately 750 lbf (3,336.17 N) residual thrust from its exhaust.

Over the years, there have been a number of engine development versions, which are grouped by series numbers. The Series I collection of derivatives came out in 1954, producing a sea-level static power rating of 3,460 propeller shp (2,580 kW) at a 59 °F (15 °C; 519 °R; 288 K) ambient temperature. Successive engine follow-ups included the Series II, which was introduced in 1958 and had an increased power rating of 3,755 prop shp (2,800 kW), and the Series III, which came out in 1964 and had another power increase to 4,591 prop shp (3,424 kW). The Series II and III derivatives were developed under military component improvement programs (CIP). By 1965, Allison was proposing the development of Series IV derivatives, but in 1968, the United States Congress restricted CIP work to reliability and maintainability improvements instead of performance improvements. The Series IV derivatives were finally developed in the 1980s after being approved for a U.S. Air Force engine model derivative program (EMDP) in the 1979 fiscal year budget. Series IV engines include the Air Force EMDP T56-A-100 demonstrator, model T56-A-101 for the Air Force's C-130 aircraft, T56-A-427 for NAVAIR's E-2C and C-2A aircraft, 501-D39 for the Lockheed L-100 aircraft, and the 501-K34 marine turboshaft for NAVSEA. The T56-A-427 was capable of 5,912 prop shp (4,409 kW), but it was torque-limited to 5,250 prop shp (3,910 kW).

The Lockheed Martin C-130J Super Hercules, which first flew in 1996, has the T56 replaced by the Rolls-Royce AE 2100, which uses dual FADECs (Full Authority Digital Engine Control) to control the engines and propellers. It drives six-bladed scimitar propellers from Dowty Rotol.

The T56 Series 3.5, an engine enhancement program to reduce fuel consumption and decrease temperatures, was approved in 2013 for the National Oceanic and Atmospheric Administration (NOAA) WP-3D "Hurricane Hunter" aircraft. After eight years of development and marketing efforts by Rolls-Royce, the T56 Series 3.5 was also approved in 2015 for engine retrofits on the U.S. Air Force's legacy C-130 aircraft that were currently in service with T56 Series III engines. As part of the T56 Series 3.5 upgrade, parts from the T56 Series IV engine (such as the compressor seals) and the uncooled turbine blades from the AE 1107C turboshaft would be retrofit into existing T56 Series III casing installations. Propeller upgrades to eight-bladed NP2000 propellers from UTC Aerospace Systems have been applied to the E-2 Hawkeye, C-2 Greyhound, and older-model C-130 Hercules aircraft, and will be adopted on the P-3 Orion.

Production of the T56 engine is expected to continue to at least 2026, with the U.S. Naval Air Systems Command (NAVAIR) order in 2019 of 24 additional E-2D Advanced Hawkeyes (AHEs) powered by the T56-A-427A engine variant.

=== Experimental and non-turboprop uses ===
The T56/Model 501 engine has been used in a number of experimental efforts, and as something other than a turboprop powerplant. In early 1960, two Allison YT56-A-6 experimental turbine engines without propellers were added next to existing propulsion engines on flight tests of a Lockheed NC-130B 58-0712 aircraft. The YT56-A-6 produced pressurized air for blowing over control surfaces to demonstrate boundary layer control (BLC), which helped to enable short takeoff and landing (STOL) performance. In 1963, Lockheed and Allison designed another STOL demonstrator, this time for a U.S. Army requirement. Lockheed internal designation GL298-7 involved a C-130E Hercules that was re-engined with 4,591 shp (3,424 kW) 501-M7B turboprops. The 501-M7B produced more power than the normally installed, 3,755 shp (2,800 kW) T56-A-7 engines by about 20% (though the 501-M7B was limited to 4,200 shp (3,100 kW) to avoid additional structural changes), because the introduction of air cooling in the turbine's first-stage blade and the first and second-stage vanes allowed for an increase in the turbine inlet temperature.

In 1963, an aeroderivative line of industrial gas turbines based on the T56 was introduced in under the 501-K name. The 501-K is offered as a single-shaft version for constant speed applications and as a two-shaft version for variable-speed, high-torque applications. Series II standard turbines included the natural gas-fueled 501-K5 and the liquid-fueled 501-K14. The air-cooled Series III turbines included the natural gas-fueled 501-K13 and the liquid-fueled 501-K15. Marinized turboshaft versions of the 501-K were used to generate electrical power onboard many United States Navy cruisers and destroyers, and for propulsion on 4 Canadian Navy destroyers.

During the late 1960s, the U.S. Navy funded the development of the T56-A-18 engine, which introduced a new gearbox compared with the early gearbox on the T56-A-7. The 50-hour preliminary flight rating test (PFRT) was completed for the T56-A-18 in 1968. In the early 1970s, Boeing Vertol selected Allison (at that time known as the Detroit Diesel Allison Division (DDAD) of General Motors) to power a dynamic-system test rig (DSTR) supporting the development of its XCH-62 heavy-lift helicopter (HLH) program for the U.S. Army, using the Allison 501-M62B turboshaft engine. The 501-M62B had a 13-stage compressor based on the 501-M24 demonstrator engine, which was a fixed single-shaft engine with an increased overall pressure ratio and a variable-geometry compressor, and it had an annular combustor based on the T56-A-18 and other development programs. The turbine was derived from the fixed single-shaft T56, which had a four-stage section in which the first two stages provided enough power to drive the compressor, and the other two stages offered enough power to drive the propeller shaft. For the double-shaft 501-M62B engine, it was split into a two-stage turbine driving the compressor, where the turbine stages had air-cooled blades and vanes, and a two-stage free power turbine driving the propeller through a gearbox. The 501-M62B also incorporated improvements proven by Allison's GMA 300 demonstrator program, which allowed for an airflow of 42 lb/s (1,100 kg/min). After DSTR testing was successful, the 501-M62B engine was further developed into the XT701-AD-700 engine for use on the HLH. The 8,079 shp (6,025 kW) XT701 passed the tests required to enter ground and flight testing on the HLH, but funding of the HLH program was canceled in August 1975, when the triple-turbine, tandem-rotor helicopter prototype had reached 95% completion.

Following the HLH program cancellation, Allison decided in early 1976 to apply the XT701 engine technology into a new industrial gas turbine product, the 570-K. The industrial engine, which entered production in the late 1970s, was derated to 7,170 shp (5,350 kW) and adapted for marine, gas compressor, and electrical power generation variants. The only major changes made for the 570-K were the elimination of compressor bleed air and replacing the XT701's titanium compressor case with a steel case. The 570-K was then adapted to the 6,000 shp (4,500 kW) 501-M78B demonstration engine, which Lockheed flew on a Grumman Gulfstream II as part of the NASA Propfan Test Assessment Program in the late 1980s. The 501-M78B had the same 13-stage compressor, combustor, 2-stage gas producer turbine, and 2-stage free power turbine used on the XT701 and 570-K, but it was connected through a 6.797 reduction ratio gearbox to a 9 ft diameter (2.7 m) Hamilton Standard single-rotation propfan, containing propfan blades that were swept back 45 degrees at the tips.

== Variants ==
The T56 has been developed extensively throughout its production run, the many variants are described by the manufacturer as belonging to four main series groups.

Initial civil variants (Series I) were designed and produced by the Allison Engine Company as the 501-D and powered the Lockheed C-130 Hercules. Later variants (Series II, III, and IV) and the Series 3.5 engine enhancement kit gave increased performance through design refinements.

Further derivatives of the 501-D/T56 were produced as turboshafts for helicopters including a variant designated T701 that was developed for the canceled Boeing Vertol XCH-62 project.

== Applications ==
- Aero Spacelines Super Guppy
- Boeing Vertol XCH-62
- Boeing 929 Jetfoil
- Convair 580 and Convair 5800
- Grumman C-2 Greyhound
- Lockheed C-130 Hercules
- Lockheed CP-140 Aurora
- Lockheed L-100 Hercules
- Lockheed L-188 Electra
- Lockheed P-3 Orion
- Northrop Grumman E-2 Hawkeye
- Piasecki YH-16B Transporter

== Specifications (T56 Series IV) ==
Data from Rolls-Royce.

==== General characteristics ====
- Type: Turboprop engine
- Length: 146.1 in (3,710 mm)
- Diameter: 27 in (690 mm)
- Dry weight: 1,940 lb (880 kg)

==== Components ====
- Compressor: 14 stage axial flow
- Combustors: 6 cylindrical flow-through
- Turbine: 4 stage shared load
- Fuel type: Kerosene, jet fuel (Jet A, Jet A-1, JP-4, JP-5, or JP-8), or aviation gasoline (grade 115/145 or lower)

==== Performance ====
- Maximum power output: SLS, 59 °F (15 °C), max power: 5,912 shp (4,409 kW) (torque limited to 5,250 shp (3,910 kW)); 25,000 ft altitude (7,600 m), Mach 0.5, max continuous power: 3,180 shp (2,370 kW)
- Turbine inlet temperature: 860 °C (1,580 °F)
- Fuel consumption: 2,412 lb/h (1,094 kg/h)
- Specific fuel consumption: SLS, 59 °F (15 °C), max power: 0.4690 lb/(hp⋅h) (0.2127 kg/(hp⋅h); 0.2853 kg/kWh); 25,000 ft altitude (7,600 m), Mach 0.5, max continuous power: 0.4200 lb/(hp⋅h) (0.1905 kg/(hp⋅h); 0.2555 kg/kWh)
- Power-to-weight ratio: 2.75 shp/lb (4.52 kW/kg)

== See also ==
Related development

- Allison T38
- Allison T40
- Allison T78
- Rolls-Royce AE 2100
- Rolls-Royce AE 3007
- Rolls-Royce T406

Comparable engines

- Bristol Proteus
- Ivchenko AI-20
- Lycoming T55
- Napier Eland
- Rolls-Royce Tyne

Related lists

- List of aircraft engines

== Bibliography ==
- Zigmunt, Joan Everling (June 1997). Allison, the people and the power: A pictorial history. Turner Publishing Company. ISBN 1-56311-315-5. OCLC 37537128.
- Sonnenburg, Paul; Schoneberger, William A (1990). Allison power of excellence 1915-1990. ISBN 0-9627074-0-6. OCLC 22964244.
- Allison Gas Turbine Operations (August 1983). "Allison industrial gas turbines 501-K, 570-K" (PDF). International Power Technology.
- Yaffee, Michael L. (12 August 1974). "New family of Allison engines evolving". Aeronautical engineering. Aviation Week & Space Technology. pp. 44(4). ISSN 0005-2175.
- Aircraft Industries Association, Inc. (1958). 1957-1958 aircraft year book (PDF) (39th ed.). American Aviation Publications, Inc. Archived from the original (PDF) on 22 January 2022.
- Hotz, Robert (12 December 1955). "Allison moves to boost its airline sales". Management. Aviation Week. Vol. 63, no. 24. Indianapolis, Indiana, U.S.A. pp. 27, 29–31. ISSN 0005-2175.
