= Allison T56 variants =

Range of American turboprop aircraft engines

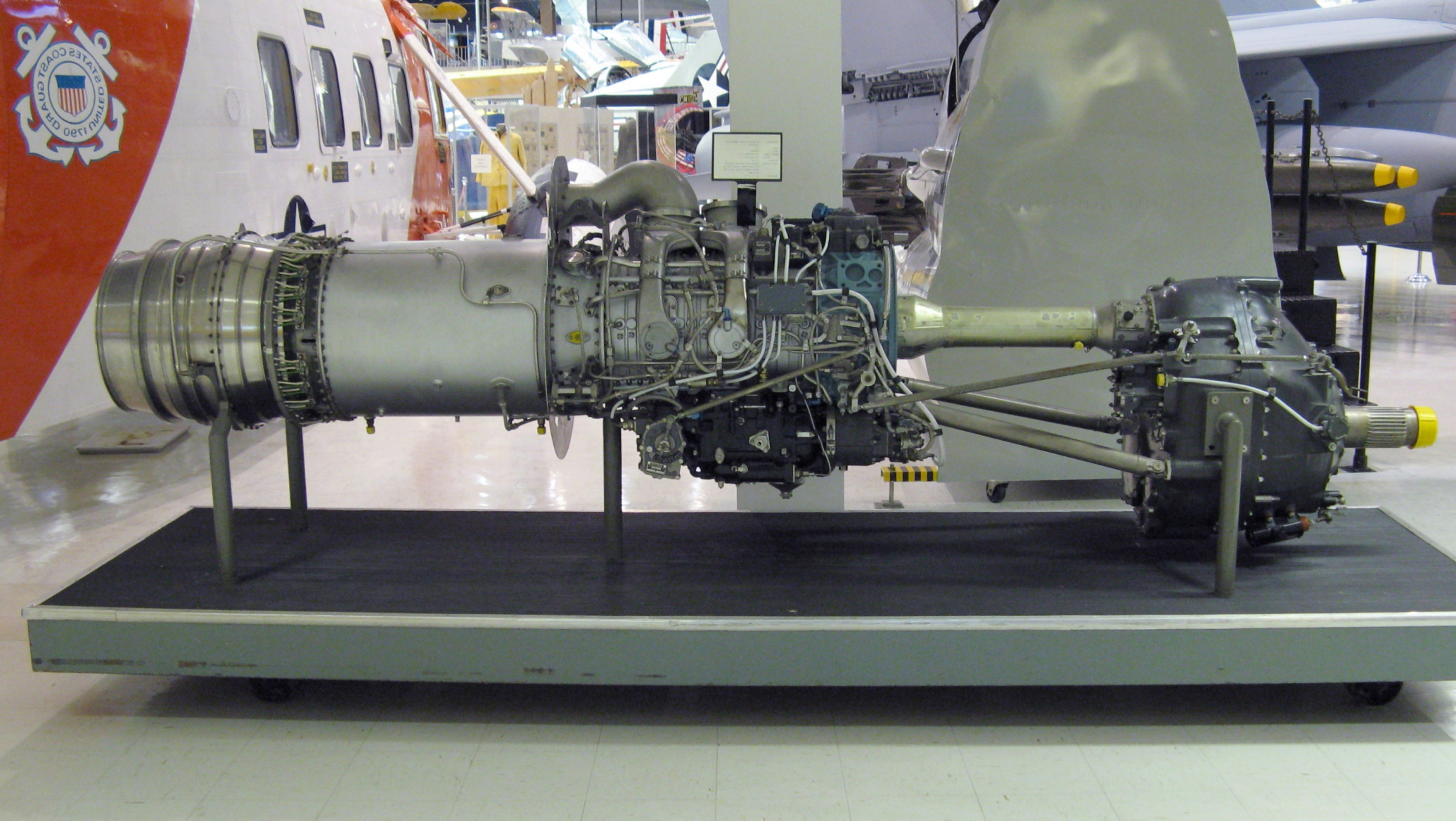
- Allison T-56 on display at the National Naval Aviation Museum, Pensacola
- Type: Turboprop/turboshaft
- National origin: United States
- Manufacturer: Allison Engine Company; Rolls-Royce Holdings
- First run: 1950

The Allison T56 turboprop engine has been developed extensively throughout its production run, the many variants are described by the manufacturer as belonging to four main series groups.

Initial civil variants (Series I) were designed and produced by the Allison Engine Company as the 501-D and powered the Lockheed C-130 Hercules. Later variants (Series II, III, 3,5 and IV) gave increased performance through design refinements.

Further derivatives of the 501-D/T56 were produced as turboshafts for helicopters including a variant with a United States military aircraft engine designation of T701, which was developed for the canceled Boeing Vertol XCH-62 project.

== Commercial variants (501-D) ==
501-D10
The initial civil variant, which was proposed in 1955 with 3,750 equivalent shp (2,800 kW) of power at a brake specific fuel consumption (BSFC) of 0.54 lb/(hp⋅h) (0.24 kg/(hp⋅h); 0.33 kg/kWh), a two-stage gearbox with a reduction ratio of 12.5:1, a 14-stage axial flow compressor with a compression ratio over 9:1, a four-stage turbine, and a 13 1/2 ft diameter (4.11 m), three-blade Aeroproducts A6341FN-215 propeller.
501-D13
(Series I) Commercial version of the T56-A-1 used on the Lockheed L-188 Electra, but using kerosene as the primary fuel and JP4 as the alternate (instead of JP4 as primary and gasoline as secondary), and with the gearbox reduction ratio increased to 13.54 from 12.5, which lowers the propeller blade tip speed by 8 percent to 721 ft/s (220 m/s; 427 kn; 492 mph; 791 km/h) for the 13 ft 6 in (4.11 m) Aeroproducts 606 propeller; 3,750 equivalent shp (2,800 kW) power rating at sea level takeoff, 14-stage axial compressor, 6 cannular combustion chambers, and 4-stage turbine; 13,820 rpm shaft and 1,780 °F (970 °C; 2,240 °R; 1,240 K) turbine inlet temperature; certified on September 12, 1957.

501-D13A
(Series I) Similar to the 501-D13 but using a Hamilton Standard propeller; certified on April 15, 1958.

501-D13D
(Series I) Similar to the 501-D13 except for the location of the rear mount and using D.C. generator drive; certified on December 18, 1959; used on the Convair CV-580 passenger aircraft.

501-D13E
(Series I) Similar to the 501-D13 except for the location of the rear mount; certified on December 18, 1959.

501-D13H
(Series I) Similar to the 501-D13D but with water-methanol injection; certified on February 20, 1964; used on the USAF's General Dynamics NC-131H Samaritan. and the Convair CV-580.

501-D15
A 4,050 shp (3,020 kW) engine under development for the Lockheed Electra.

501-D22
(Series II) Similar to the 501-D13A but with 4,050 equivalent shp (3,020 kW) power rating at sea level takeoff, a shroud turbine, gearbox offset up, and no auto-feathering; certified on October 28, 1964. Used on the Lockheed L-100 Hercules.

501-D22A
(Series III); Similar to the 501-D22 but with 4,680 equivalent shp (3,490 kW) power rating at sea level takeoff and air-cooled first-stage turbine blades, vanes, and stalk blades in all four turbine stages; certified on January 23, 1968.

501-D22C
(Series III) Similar to the 501-D22A but with gearbox offset down, integral mount pads, and water-methanol injection; certified on December 27, 1968; powered the Aero Spacelines Super Guppy.

501-D22D
A 4,591 shp (3,424 kW) derivative to power the proposed Lockheed L-400, a twin-engine version of the L-100.

501-D22E
Offered in 1979 as the initial engine for Lockheed's proposed L-100-60 (a stretched derivative of the Lockheed L-100).

501-D22G
(Series III) Similar to the 501-D22C but with 4,815 equivalent shp (3,591 kW) power rating at sea level takeoff, a three-mount system, auto-feathering, and no water-methanol injection; certified on March 23, 1984. Used on the Convair CV-580

501-D36
(Series II) Re-engined powerplant for the Royal Canadian Air Force (RCAF) CC-109 Cosmopolitan in 1966.

501-D39
(Series IV) Offered for the Lockheed L-100 civil aircraft, starting in 1979 for the proposed L-100-60 as the successor engine to the 501-D22E, producing 5,575 shp (4,157 kW) with 14 ft diameter (4.3 m) propellers; was the commercial version of the 501-M71.

501-H2
Engine for the proposed Vanguard Model 30 lift fan aircraft that was entered in a 1961 vertical takeoff and landing (VTOL) transport competition; powered two 8 ft diameter (2.4 m) fans within the wings and two 14 ft 6 in diameter (4.42 m) propellers; used a modified compressor for handling larger air flows.

501-M1
Modified engine with new turbine blades that were hollow and air-cooled; on an experimental engine combining features of the 501-M1 with the 501-H2, ran at 6,770 shp (5,050 kW) for nearly 2.5 hours at a turbine inlet temperature of 2,060 °F (1,130 °C; 2,520 °R; 1,400 K) in January 1962 under a program funded by the Air Force and Navy.

501-M7B
Replaces the T56-A-7 on an experimental short takeoff and landing (STOL) version of the Lockheed C-130E (internally designated as the GL298-7) targeted in 1963 for the U.S. Army; power increased by 20% over the T56-A-7 due to lowering of the gear reduction ratio from 13.54 to 12.49, propeller blade changes to take advantage of the higher resulting propeller rotational speed, and a new turbine with air-cooled first and second-stage vanes and first-stage blades, so the turbine inlet temperature can be increased from 1,780 °F (970 °C; 2,240 °R; 1,240 K) for the T56-A-7 to 1,970 °F (1,080 °C; 2,430 °R; 1,350 K); a 4,591 shp (3,424 kW) rate engine that is restricted to 4,200 shp (3,100 kW) and about 10,600 lbf (4,800 kgf; 47 kN) of static thrust on the STOL C-130E, but is capable of 13,000 lbf (5,900 kgf; 58 kN) thrust at full power and with a larger, 15 ft (4.6 m) propeller.

501-M22
Internal designation for the T56-A-18; submitted for FAA certification under a new type certificate.

501-M23
Submitted for FAA certification under an amended type certificate.

501-M24
A demonstrator engine started in 1964 that was later used to derive the 501-M62B engine developed for the XCH-62 helicopter.

501-M25
A 6,000 shp (4,500 kW) four-stage fixed turbine engine similar to the T56-A-15, but with a 90 °F (50 °C) increase from the T56-A-15's maximum turbine inlet temperature rating of 1,970 °F (1,080 °C; 2,430 °R; 1,350 K), and a variable geometry compressor for the inlet vane and the first five stator vanes; investigated in 1965 to power helicopters with a 75,000–85,000 lb (34,000–39,000 kg) maximum takeoff weight (MTOW).

501-M26
A 5,450 shp (4,060 kW) similar to the 501-M25 but with a free turbine instead of a fixed turbine, and a two-stage gas producer turbine; based on the T56-A-18 engine.

501-M34
A 5,175 shp (3,859 kW) turboshaft engine targeted for a 60-70 seat commuter helicopter proposal from Lockheed-California in 1966.

501-M56
Engine candidate for the turboprop version of the Air Force A-X close air support aircraft, requiring 4,400 shp (3,300 kW) of engine power.

501-M62B
An internal designation for the engine that became the 8,079-shaft-horsepower (6,025-kilowatt) T701-AD-700 turboshaft, which weighed 1,179 lb (535 kg) and was intended to power the Boeing Vertol XCH-62 heavy-lift helicopter; 15 engines built, 700 hours of component testing, and almost 2,500 hours of engine development testing completed before the helicopter project's cancellation.

501-M69
Engine proposed for transport-type offensive anti-air (TOAA) aircraft versions of the P-3 Orion (stretched derivative) and C-130 Hercules; rated power of 4,678 shp (3,488 kW), equivalent installed thrust-specific fuel consumption at cruise of 0.52 lb/(lbf⋅h) (15 g/(kN⋅s)).

501-M71
A derivative of the T56-A-14 evaluated by NAVAIR in 1982 to achieve 10% lower fuel consumption, 24% more horsepower, smokeless exhaust, and greater reliability.

501-M71K
(Series IV) A 5,250 hp (3,910 kW) engine using a larger propeller to power the Lockheed L-100-20 (L382E-44K-20) High Technology Test Bed (HTTB) for short takeoff and landing (STOL) starting in 1989, but was destroyed when the HTTB became airborne during a ground test on February 3, 1993.

501-M78
A 6,000 shp (4,500 kW) demonstrator engine for NASA's Propfan Test Assessment (PTA) program. It had a modified reduction gearbox that reversed the direction of rotation and increased the output speed from 1,020 rpm to 1,698 rpm. The engine was attached to an eight-bladed, 9 ft diameter (2.7 m), single-rotation Hamilton Standard SR-7L propeller. Shown as an 8,000 hp (6,000 kW) engine at the 1983 Dayton Air Show, the 501-M78 was flight-tested on a Gulfstream II aircraft beginning in May 1987. Various flight and ground testing programs were carried out on the engine testbed through June 1989.

501-M80C
Also known as the T406-AD-400, a 6,000 shp class (4,500 kW) turboshaft engine. primarily based on the T56-A-427, but with a free-turbine turboshaft added to the single-spool engine; used on the V-22 Osprey tiltrotor assault transport.

PW–Allison 501-M80E
A 14,800 lbf thrust (6,700 kgf; 66 kN) contra-rotating geared propfan engine derived from the 501-M80C/T406 turboshaft engine and intended for use on a 92-seat version of the proposed MPC 75 regional aircraft; developed jointly with Pratt & Whitney.

501-M80R3
A turboprop engine offered as an equal partnership between Allison and Pratt & Whitney to power Lockheed's proposed successor to the P-3 Orion, which was developed for the U.S. Navy's long-range air antisubmarine warfare (ASW) capable aircraft (LRAACA) program.

501-M80R33
A propfan engine studied for the MPC 75 that was based on the T406 core and rated at 11,000 lbf thrust (5,000 kgf; 49 kN).

== Industrial and marine variants (501-K) ==
501-KF
Allison's first marine gas turbine, it was used for electrical generation on Spruance-class destroyers, with each of the three turbogenerators producing 2,000 kW. A version with a new AC generator producing 2,500 kW was used on Kidd-class destroyers and Ticonderoga-class cruisers. A substantially altered and incompatible version was used on Arleigh Burke-class destroyers, generating 2,500 kW on Flight I and II ships as the AG9130 generator set and 3,000 kW on Flight IIA ships as the AG9140 generator set. Commercial variants have also been used on the Boeing 929 Jetfoil and Israeli Shimrit-class missile boats.

570-KF
Part of a new series of engines introducing technology used in Allison's T701, introduced in 1983 and capable of producing 6,350 shp (4,740 kW). This engine has been used on Stockholm-class corvettes, Iroquois-class destroyers, and several private yachts.

571-KF
Part of the same series as 570-KF, introduced in 1986. Largely identical to the 570-KF, but with an additional stage on the power turbine and higher compression ratio for greater power generation, at 7,630 shp (5,690 kW).

572-KF
Introduced in 1996, the 572-K series are further derivatives of 571-K incorporating an entirely new compressor along with three dry low emissions combustors taken directly from the Rolls-Royce RB211 to reduce the engine's emissions footprint. It is capable of generating between 6,470 kW (8,680 shp) and 7,830 kW (10,500 shp)

MT5S
A replacement for the venerable 501-KF in military vessels, MT5S was developed for use aboard the Zumwalt-class destroyers as part of the RR4500 generator set, producing 3,800 kW. An uprated version known as MT5S-HE+ has since been developed for use in the AG9160 generator sets fitted to Flight III Arleigh Burke-class destroyers where it produces 4,000 kW.

== Military variants (T56) ==
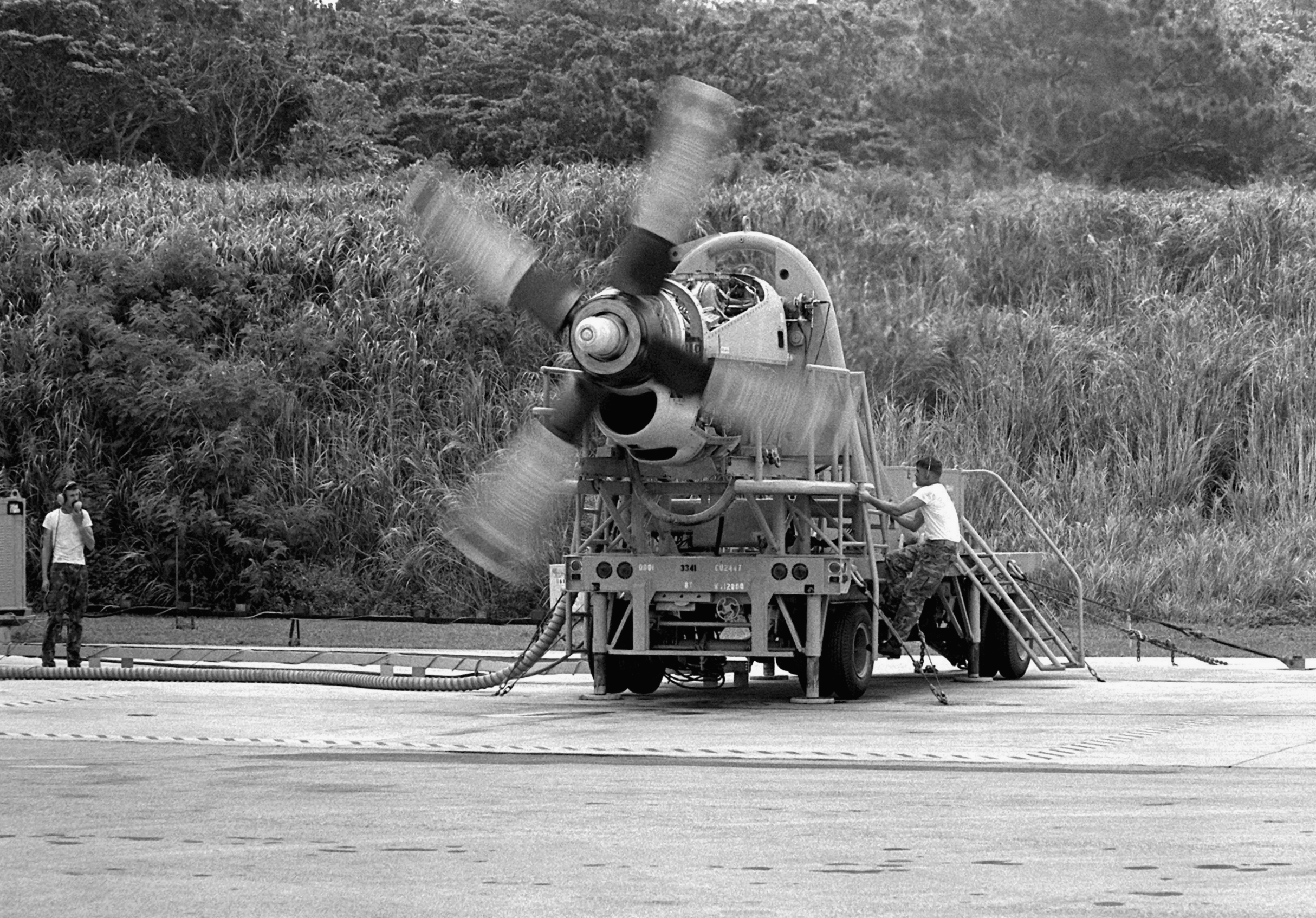
A T56 on a mobile test unit at MCAS Futenma, 1982

T56-A-1
(Series I) A 1,600 lb weight (730 kg) engine delivering 3,460 shp (2,580 kW) and 725 lbf (329 kgf; 3.22 kN) residual jet thrust, which is equal to 3,750 equivalent shp (2,800 kW); single-shaft 14-stage axial flow compressor, cannular combustion chamber with 6-cylindrical through-flow combustion liners, 4-stage axial flow turbine; 13,800-rpm shaft connected to a 2-stage reduction gear with a 12.5-to-1 ratio, consisting of a 3.125-to-1 spur set followed by a 4.0-to-1 planet set.

T56-A-1A
A 3,750 equivalent shp (2,800 kW) engine used on the Lockheed C-130A Hercules.

T56-A-2
Proposed gas generator engines for the McDonnell XHCH-1 helicopter.

T56-A-3
A 3,250 equivalent shp (2,420 kW) engine that was paired with an Aeroproducts propeller and test flown by the Military Air Transport Service (MATS) on a pair of Convair YC-131C twin-turboprop aircraft between January and December 1955.

T56-A-4
A 2,900 hp (2,200 kW) engine for the C-131D executive transport/VC-131H VIP transport; also the proposed engines for the McDonnell XHRH-1 helicopter, with propeller drive and gas generator bleed for rotor-tip pressure jets.

T56-A-5
A 2,100 shp (1,600 kW) turboshaft version for the Piasecki YH-16B Transporter helicopter.

T56-A-6
Gas generator engines for the NC-130B (58-0712) boundary layer control (BLC) demonstrator.

T56-A-7
(Series II) A 4,050 shp (3,020 kW) engine flight-tested on a U.S. Air Force Allison Boeing B-17 flying testbed aircraft, intended for the Lockheed C-130B; also used on the C-130E; produces about 9,500 lbf (4,300 kgf; 42 kN) of static thrust.

T56-A-7A
(Series II) Lockheed C-130B Hercules Starting May 1959.

T56-A-7B
(Series II) Used on the U.S. Air Force C/HC/NC-130B, MC-130E, and WC-130F; similar to -A-7A.

T56-A-8
(Series II) Entered production in 1959; the original engine on the Grumman E-2C, using the Aeroproducts A6441FN-248 propeller.

T56-A-9
(Series I) Used on the U.S. Air Force C/AC/DC/GC/NC/RC-130A and the C-130D.

T56-A-9D
(Series I) Lockheed C-130A Hercules starting December 1956 and on all Grumman E-2A Hawkeyes from 1960.

T56-A-9E
(Series I) Similar to -A-9D.

T56-A-10W
(Series II) Water injection model that entered production in 1960.

T56-A-10WA
(Series II) Used on the P-3A, EP-3A, and RP-3A.

T56-A-11
Ordered for 12 Royal Australian Air Force C-130s in 1958.

T56-A-13
(Series 3.5) Enhancements that improve SFC by 7.9%, increase maximum engine torque limit operation from 90 to 118 °F (32 to 48 °C; 549 to 578 °R; 305 to 321 K), and increase turbine life; tested on a C-130H testbed aircraft in 2012.

T56-A-14
(Series III) Lockheed P-3/EP-3/WP-3/AP-3/CP-140 Aurora from August 1962; entered production in 1964.

T56-A-14A
(Series 3.5) Fuel efficiency and reliability upgrade, Lockheed WP-3D Orion from May 2015.

T56-A-15
(Series III) Lockheed C-130H Hercules USAF from June 1974.

T56-A-15A
(Series 3.5) Upgrade of the T56-A-15 on the Air Force LC-130H.

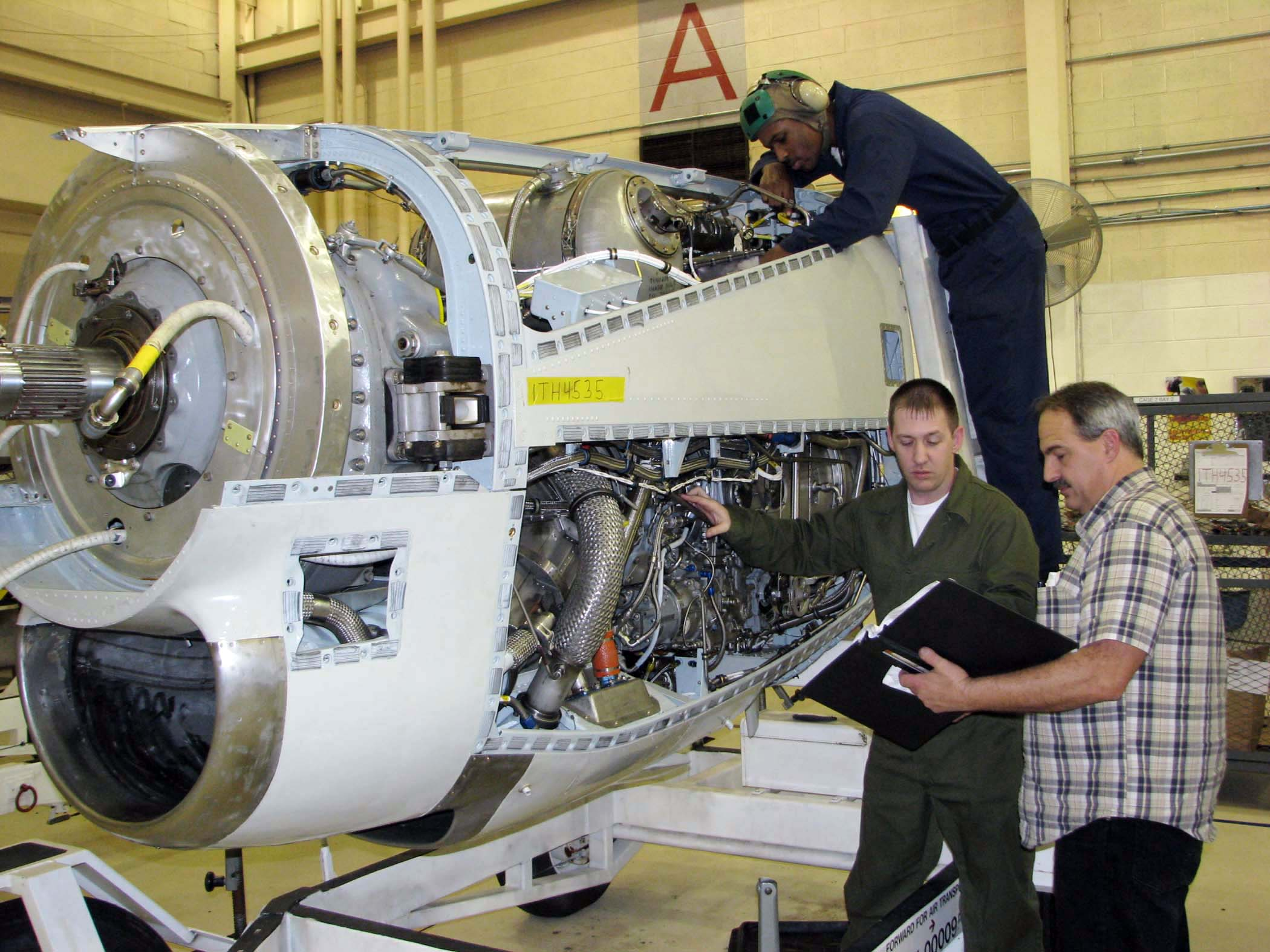
Maintenance of a T56-A-16, 2009

T56-A-16
(Series III) Used on the KC-130F, KC-130R, LC-130F, and LC-130R.

T56-A-16A
(Series 3.5).

T56-A-18
A 5,325 equivalent shp (3,971 kW), 1,554 lb (705 kg) variant that was designed and first run in 1965; Navy-funded development with air-cooled blades and vanes in the first two stages; 50-hour preliminary flight rating test completed in 1968; turbine inlet temperature of 2,070 °F (1,130 °C; 2,530 °R; 1,410 K); introduced major gearbox update after 4,000 hours of back-to-back testing, featuring a double helical first gear stage, a planetary helical gear for the second stage, and fewer parts for the accessory gearing (compared with a first-stage spur gear, second-stage planetary spur gear, and separable clamped components in the accessory gearing for the T56-A-7 gearbox); used an eight-bladed Hamilton Standard variable-camber propeller.

T56-A-20
Proposed in 1968 to be funded within the 1969 fiscal year component improvement program (CIP).

T56-A-100
(Series IV) U.S. Air Force EMDP demonstrator

T56-A-101
(Series IV) Offered for the Lockheed C-130 Hercules.

T56-A-422
Used on U.S. Navy Northrop Grumman E-2C Hawkeye aircraft.

T56-A-423
Used on U.S. Navy Lockheed EC-130G and EC-130Q aircraft.

T56-A-425
(Series III) Replaced the T56-A-8 on the Grumman E-2C, using the 13.5 ft diameter (4.1 m) Hamilton 54460-1 propeller; Grumman C-2A Greyhound from June 1974.

T56-A-426
Used on the C-2A, E-2B, and TE-2A
T56-A-427
(Series IV) Northrop Grumman E-2 Hawkeye upgrades from 1972.

T56-A-427A
(Series IV) Used on the Northrop Grumman E-2D Advanced Hawkeye (AHE), which first flew in 2007.

== T701 ==
T701-AD-700
An 8,079 shp (6,025 kW) turboshaft powerplant developed from the 501-M62B and intended for use on the canceled three-engine Boeing Vertol XCH-62 heavy-lift helicopter; air flow of 44 lb/s (20 kg/s), pressure ratio of 12.8:1, turbine temperature of 2,290 °F (1,250 °C; 2,750 °R; 1,530 K), and power/weight ratio of 6.85:1.

== See also ==
Related development

- Allison T38
- Allison T40
- Allison T78
- Rolls-Royce AE 2100
- Rolls-Royce AE 3007
- Rolls-Royce T406

Comparable engines

- Bristol Proteus
- Ivchenko AI-20
- Lycoming T55
- Napier Eland
- Rolls-Royce Tyne

Related lists

- List of aircraft engines

== Bibliography ==
- Aircraft Industries Association, Inc. (1958). 1957-1958 aircraft year book (PDF) (39th ed.). American Aviation Publications, Inc. Archived from the original (PDF) on 2022-01-22.
- Allison Gas Turbine Operations (August 1983). "Allison industrial gas turbines 501-K, 570-K" (PDF). International Power Technology.
- Hotz, Robert (December 12, 1955). "Allison moves to boost its airline sales". Management. Aviation Week. Vol. 63, no. 24. Indianapolis, Indiana, U.S.A. pp. 27, 29–31. ISSN 0005-2175.
- Sonnenburg, Paul; Schoneberger, William A (1990). Allison power of excellence 1915-1990. Coastline Publishers. ISBN 0-9627074-0-6. OCLC 22964244.
- Yaffee, Michael L. (August 12, 1974). "New family of Allison engines evolving". Aeronautical engineering. Aviation Week & Space Technology. pp. 44(4). ISSN 0005-2175.
- Zigmunt, Joan Everling (June 1997). Allison, the people and the power: A pictorial history. Turner Publishing Company. ISBN 1-56311-315-5. OCLC 37537128.
