= Allison TF32 =

The Allison TF32 was a turbofan engine proposed by the Allison Division of General Motors in the 1960s. It was named as a finalist for the U.S. Navy's VSX aircraft for anti-submarine warfare (ASW) in January 1967, but lost the competition to the General Electric TF34 in early 1968.

== Specifications (TF32-A-2) ==
Data from Zigmunt 1997, page 131

==== General characteristics ====
- Type: Two-shaft turbofan
- Length:
- Diameter:
- Dry weight: 983 lb (446 kg)

==== Components ====
- Compressor: Fourteen-stage high-pressure (HP) compressor
- Combustors: Annular
- Turbine: Two-stage air-cooled variable geometry HP turbine, four-stage free power turbine

==== Performance ====
- Maximum thrust: 8,160 lbf (3,700 kgf; 36.3 kN)
- Bypass ratio: 6

== See also ==
Comparable engines

- Allison T78
- General Electric T64
- General Electric TF34

Related lists

- List of aircraft engines
