= T78 =

T78 may refer to:

- Allison T78, a turboprop engine
- INS Karuva (T78), a patrol vessel of the Indian Navy
- Liberty Municipal Airport, in Liberty County, Texas, United States
