= Cessna Citation X =

American business jet

Cessna 750 Citation X
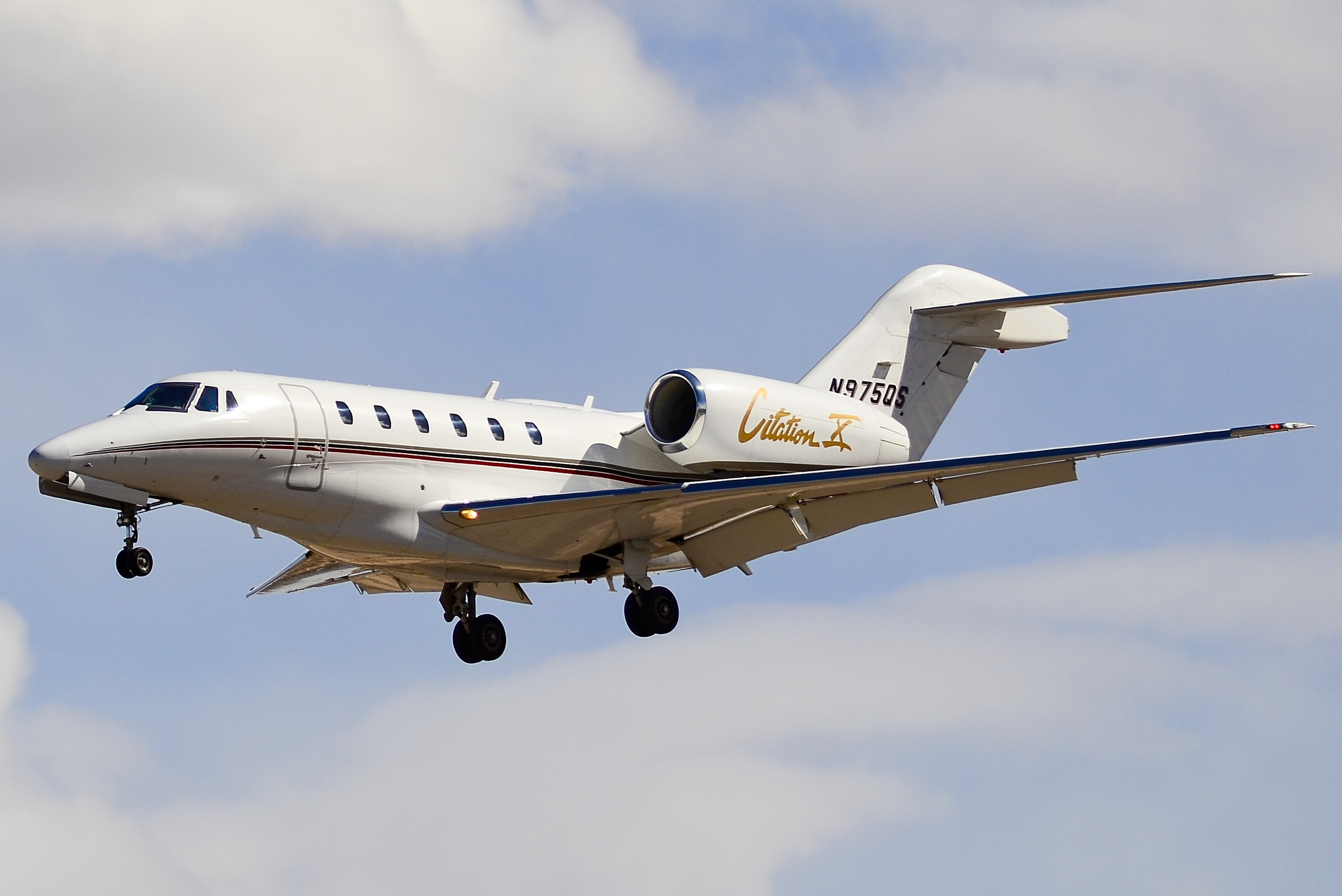
- Citation X

General information
- Type: Business Jet
- Manufacturer: Cessna
- Status: In service
- Primary users: NetJets XOJET; AirX Charter; Wheels Up; Baker Aviation
- Number built: 339: 310 X, 29 X+

History
- Manufactured: 1996–2018
- Introduction date: July 1996
- First flight: 21 December 1993
- Developed from: Cessna Citation III

The Cessna 750 Citation X (Note: X as in the Roman numeral for ten) is an American mid-size business jet produced by Cessna; it is part of the Citation family. Announced at the October 1990 NBAA convention, the Model 750 made its maiden flight on December 21, 1993, received its type certification on June 3, 1996, and was first delivered in July 1996. The updated Citation X+ was offered from 2012 with a 14 in (360 mm) cabin stretch and upgraded systems. Keeping the Citation III fuselage cross section, it has a new 37° swept wing with an area of 527 ft² (49 m^{2}) for a fast Mach 0.935 M_{MO} and a 36,600 lb (16.6 t) MTOW for a 3,460 nmi (6,408 km) range, a T-tail and two 7,034 lbf (31.29 kN) AE3007 turbofans. After 338 deliveries, production ended in 2018.

== Development ==
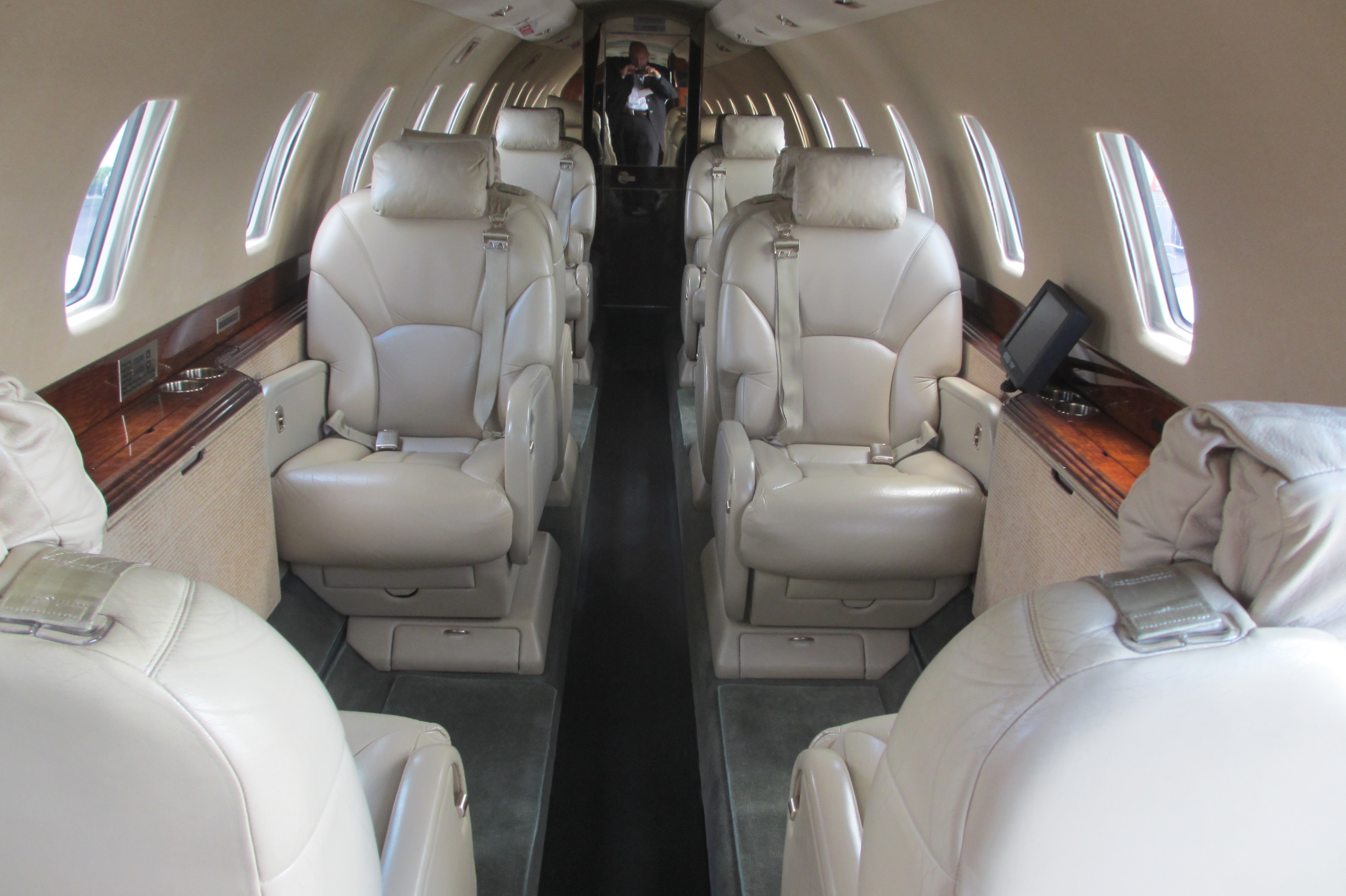
Double club cabin

When the Citation X was announced, the Citation 650 series, the "family" at the top of the product line, the Citations III, VI, and VII, was eight years old. In 1990, Cessna made a proposition for an improved 650 model to their Customer Advisory Council. The council was interested in some new elements such as increased speed and a pressurized baggage compartment. This pushed Cessna toward the Citation X program, which became the new 750 series.

Cessna wanted to improve the image of the Citation family. The Citation models that emerged in the 1970s were originally intended to be practical and with good handling qualities. Consequently, they turned out to be much slower than the competing Learjets. Cessna had difficulties in shedding the popular image of the Citation as a slow airplane, even though their jets had eventually become as fast as the competition.

The development of the Citation X was first announced at the National Business Aviation Association Convention in New Orleans in October 1990. Concurrently, engine development was conducted aboard a Cessna 650 Citation III testbed that flew with dissimilar/mismatched engines. A standard Garrett TFE731 was left installed on the left engine pylon, and the right-side engine was replaced with a larger Rolls-Royce AE 3007 designed for the Citation X, enabling flight test engineers to subject it to temperatures, pressures, and loads that could not be replicated on the ground. The first Citation X prototype made its maiden flight on December 21, 1993.

Originally scheduled for August 1995, the certification of the Cessna Citation X was delayed several times. First, failure of the airframe and engine to meet Federal Aviation Administration requirements caused the planned certification date postponement to late November 1995. The main delay reasons were troubles integrating the avionics and the engine to the aircraft, high-altitude and low-speed engine flameout (high wing attack angles caused insufficient airflow), engines not meeting the bird strike criteria and directional stability challenges. Efforts to increase the maximum take-off weight of the Citation X by about 800 pounds again delayed the FAA certification schedule, this time to April 1996. These changes were aimed at permitting a full-fuel payload of 1,400 pounds (seven passengers), but Cessna had difficulty achieving a balance between reducing Citation X cabin noise and minimizing the extra weight of sound-dampening materials. The certification, FAA FAR Part 25, Amendment 74, Certification 3, was finally achieved on June 3, 1996.

The first Citation X was delivered in July 1996 to golfer and long-time Cessna customer Arnold Palmer. Once in use, the Citation X continued to set speed records. Arnold Palmer set one of them in September 1997: 473 knots (876 km/h; 544 mph) on a 5,000 km closed course. In February 1997, the Citation X design team was awarded the National Aeronautic Association's Robert J. Collier Trophy. The Citation X was approved by Transport Canada on May 22, 1998, and by the European Joint Aviation Authorities in 1999. In October 2000, Cessna announced an upgrade for all Citation Xs to be delivered after January 1, 2002. The main characteristics of this upgraded version were a 5% increase in thrust, a 400 lb (180 kg) increase in maximum take-off weight, and improved Honeywell avionics.

=== Citation X+ ===
In 2010, Cessna initiated a major update of the aircraft, initially dubbed the Citation Ten, which included upgraded AE3007C2 engines with new fans, Garmin G5000 flight displays with three 14-inch (36 cm) screens, and an autothrottle system. The elliptical winglets that were available as an aftermarket option on the Citation X became standard, and a stretch of 38 centimetres (15 in) was incorporated to improve passenger comfort. Due to a 1.4% improvement in Specific Fuel Consumption (SFC) and increased thrust, the Citation X+ can support an increase in payload of 97 kilograms (214 lb), an increase in cruise speed at FL490 from 460 to 479 knots (529 to 551 mph), and a range increase of 190 nmi (352 km). First flight was completed on January 17, 2012. The height has been increased to 19 ft 3 in (5.85 m), length increased to 73 ft 7 in (22.43 m), wing span has been expanded to 69 ft 2 in (21.1 m), maximum takeoff weight has increased to 36,600 lb (16,602 kg), maximum cruise speed has increased to 527 knots (606 mph; 976 km/h) at FL350, and maximum range has increased to 3,242 nautical miles (3,731 mi; 6,004 km) (MTOW, Full Fuel, Optimal Climb and Descent, Mach 0.82 Cruise, FL450).

== Design ==
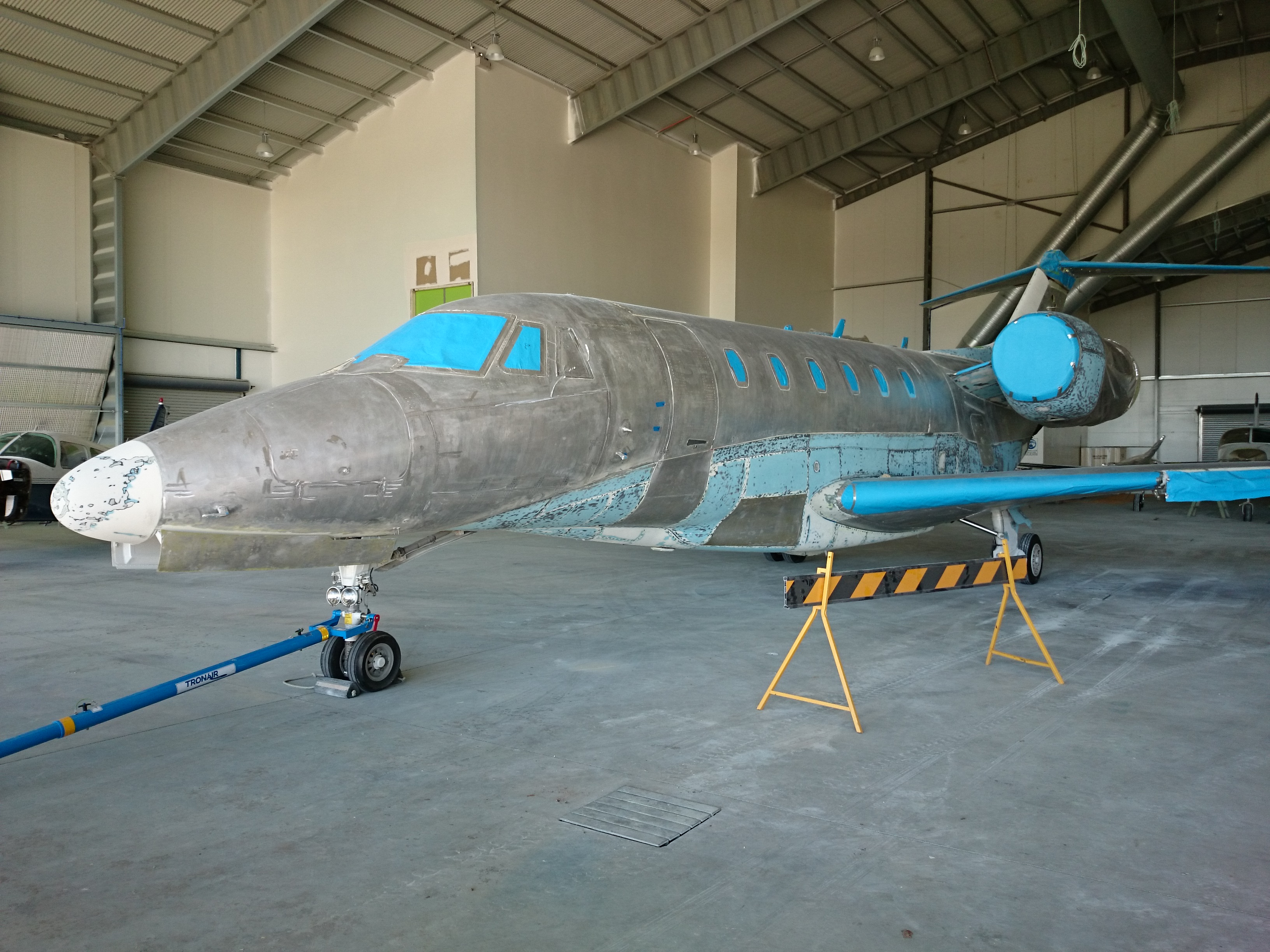
Unpainted airframe showing metal construction

The Citation X uses a new wing, tail, tail cone, landing gear, and systems, designed from scratch and not based on prior Citations. Part commonality is limited to some cockpit controls, the windshield, and the tail light bulb. The pressure bulkhead is also similar to previous designs. The Citation X has the same fuselage cross-section as the Citations III, VI and VII; however, the wing attachment to the fuselage is different from the attachment in previous Citation. The Citation X was the first aircraft from Cessna to use a Rolls-Royce engine and fully-integrated avionics.

The aircraft incorporates a number of innovative design features. One attribute that is often first noticed is the large diameter of the engine intakes. This feature, related to the high bypass ratio turbofan, reduces the noise from the engines and improves fuel efficiency. Another obvious characteristic is the highly swept wing with a supercritical airfoil, used in order to increase the critical Mach number and therefore the top speed. The Citation X has 37 degrees of sweepback at the quarter chord, more than any other business jet and, among civil aircraft, second only to the Boeing 747's 37.5 degrees. The horizontal and vertical stabilizers are also highly swept and are arranged in a T-tail configuration.

=== Airframe ===
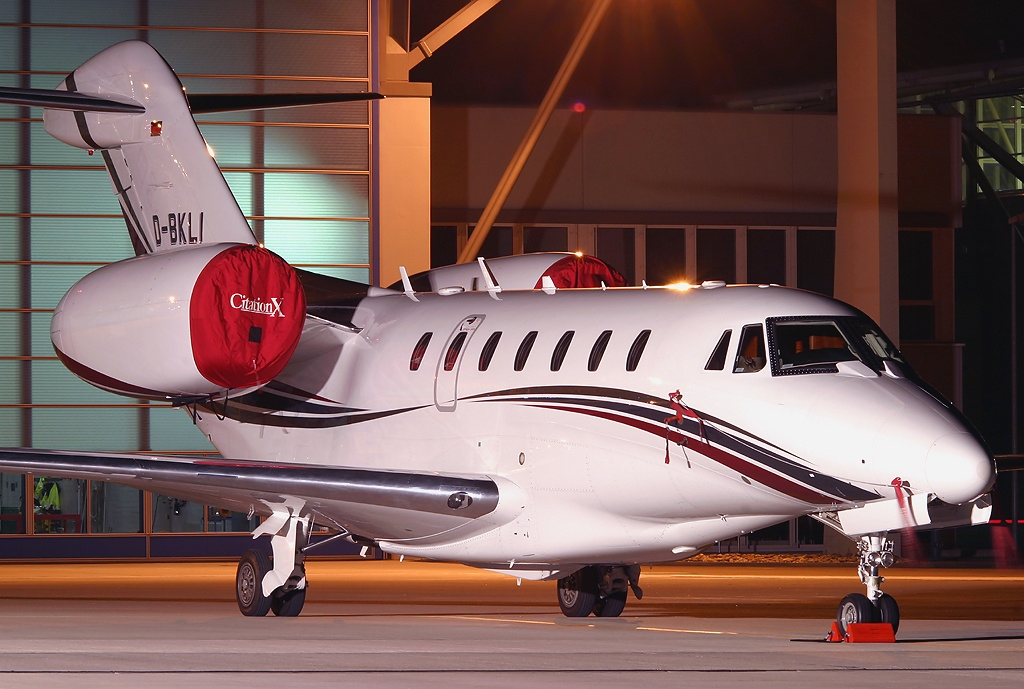
The area ruled fuselage

A significant amount of effort throughout the design process was directed towards reducing the Citation X's total drag. The resulting design includes an area-ruled fuselage for efficient transonic flight and a highly swept supercritical wing. The Citation X's wing is slung below the fuselage rather than passing through it. This allows increased volume in the fuselage, a one-piece wing, and simplified wing-fuselage connections.

=== Engines ===
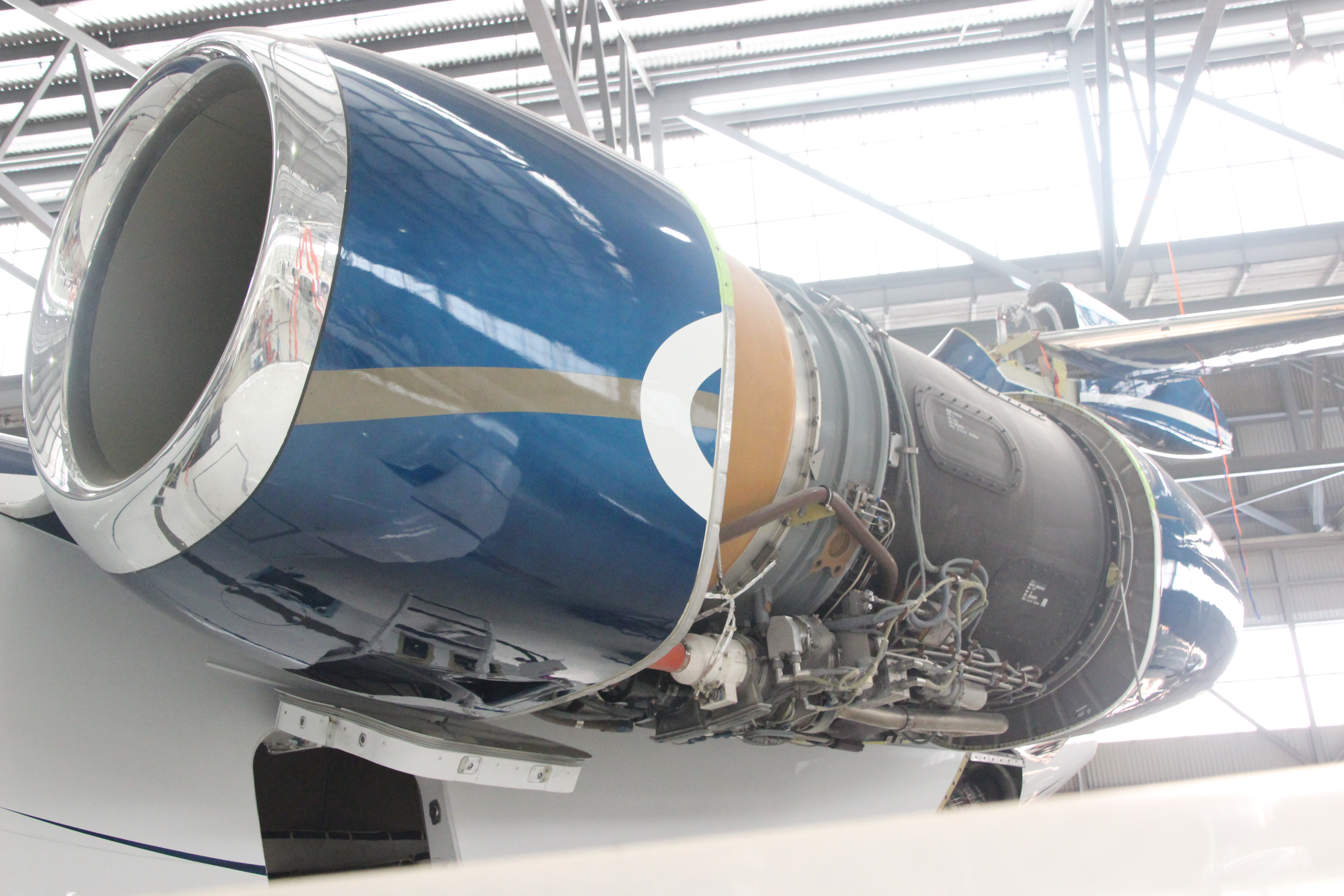
Rolls-Royce AE 3007 turbofan

The Citation X is powered by two Rolls-Royce AE 3007C (up to S/N 750-172) or AE 3007C1 engines (S/N 750-173 and subsequent), each with 6442 lbs (28.66 kN) or 6764 lbs (30.09 kN) of thrust, respectively. They are pod-mounted on the sides of the rear fuselage. It is the first Cessna aircraft to be powered by a Rolls-Royce engine. The engine has solid titanium blades and a three-stage low-pressure turbine. The engine's fan has approximately a 5 to 1 bypass ratio for improved fuel efficiency and low acoustic signature. The unit also incorporates the Honeywell GTCP36-150CX Auxiliary Power Unit (APU).

=== Powered controls ===
Another first for Cessna is the inclusion of powered controls in the Citation X. The controls are powered by dual-hydraulic systems for redundancy. There are two elevators and the tailplane is all-moving for trim. The rudder is in two pieces: the lower portion is hydraulically powered and the upper portion is electrically powered. Each wing has five spoiler panels, to be used both for roll control (in addition to the ailerons) and as speed brakes. One of the major challenges of the Citation X design was finding enough space in the wing to run all the necessary hydraulic lines. As Paul Kalberer, the chief engineer of the Citation X program, explained, the Citation X needs just as many hydraulic pumps and actuators as a large airliner, but has much less space inside the wings.

=== Avionics ===
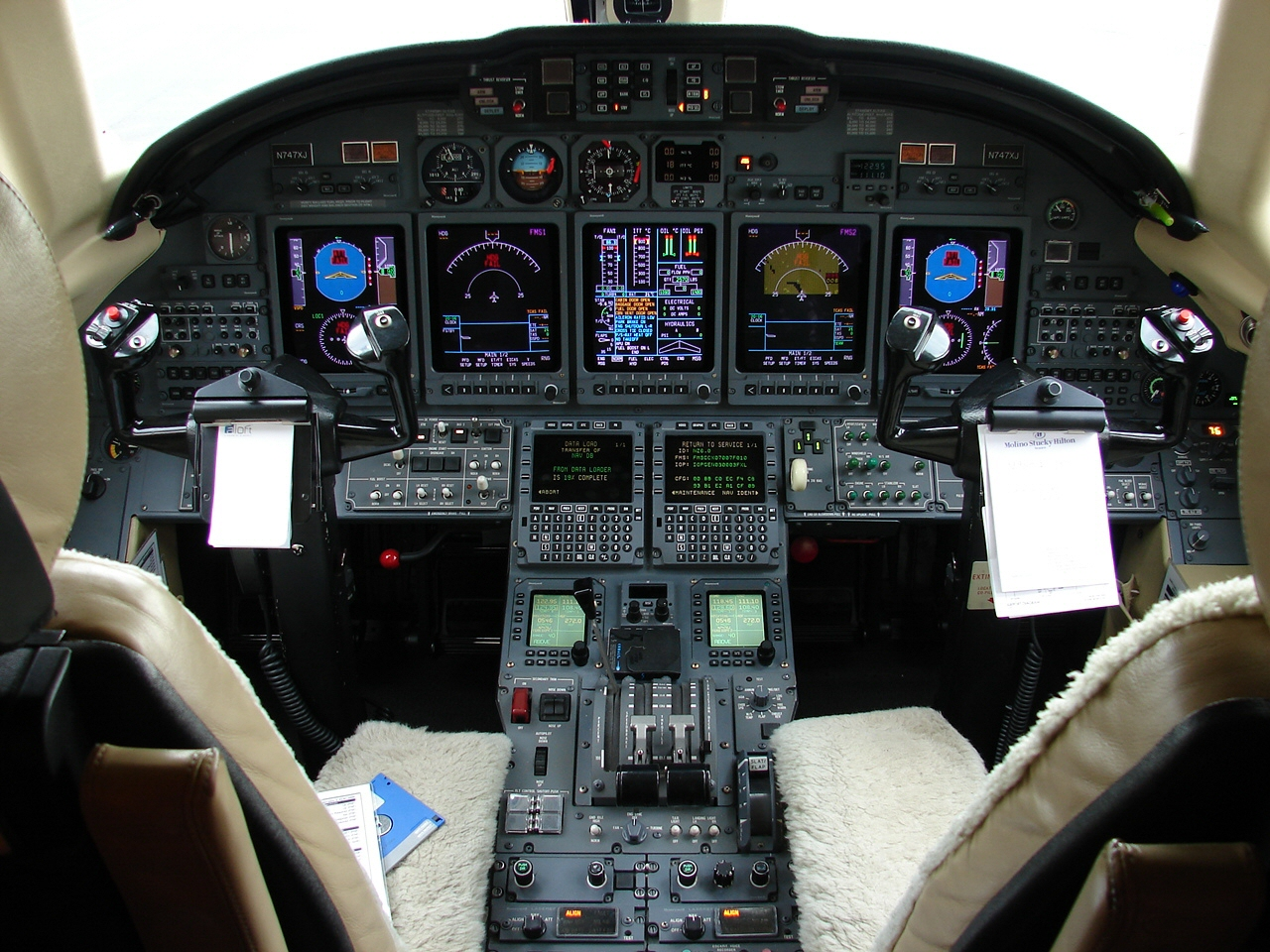
Cockpit

Honeywell provides the avionics system for the glass cockpit. The Honeywell Primus 2000 EFIS flight director system is composed of five 7-inch × 8-inch CRT screens. Dual flight management systems with GPS are standard.

In the Citation X+ the avionics were changed to the Garmin G5000 system.

=== Elliptical winglets ===
In 2008, Winglet Technology, with the help of Cessna, began flight testing epoxy/graphite elliptical winglets on a Citation X. Flight testing was nearing completion in late 2008, with FAA supplemental type certification expected in 2009. The winglets increase range by 150 nm, lower fuel burn by 4–5%, improve hot and high performance as well as climb rate, permitting a climb to flight level 430 in 22 minutes, as opposed to 26 minutes without the modification. Climb to flight level 450 at maximum takeoff weight is possible without a step climb. Cruise speed at altitude was expected to increase by 15 knots, and maximum takeoff weight to increase by 1200 lbs (545 kg). Excluding installation, the kit's projected cost is $395,000.

Elliptical winglets were made standard on Citation X+.

== Operators ==
Multiple companies have purchased the Cessna Citation X, including Waitt Media, Honeywell, Target Corporation, Townsend Engineering, General Motors and Schweitzer Engineering Laboratories since 2002.

Private owners included film director Sydney Pollack, attorney Fred Furth, Oracle's Larry Ellison, entrepreneur Steve Fossett, Formula One driver Nelson Piquet, 45th and 47th US president Donald Trump, and golfer Arnold Palmer.

NetJets ordered 60, then another 21, at the standard 10.5% discount, flying it 1,100 to 1,200 hr. per year, and XOJET, started in 2006, operates 20 jets.

Deliveries 1996–2006, 2004–2018
Variant	96	97	98	99	00	01	02	03	04	05	06	07	08	09	10	11	12	13	14	15	16	17	18	337
CE-750 Citation X	7	28	30	36	37	34	31	18	15	14	12	17	16	7	3	3	6	–	–	–	–	–	-	314
CE-750 Citation X+	–	–	–	–	–	–	–	–	–	–	–		–	–	–	–	–	–	9	6	4	4	6	29

== Accidents and incidents ==
- On March 1, 2012, a Citation X with registration N288CX, crashed into a forest during a night approach to Frankfurt Egelsbach Airport. The aircraft struck trees, inverted, and caught fire. All 5 occupants (2 crew and 3 passengers) were killed.

== Specifications ==
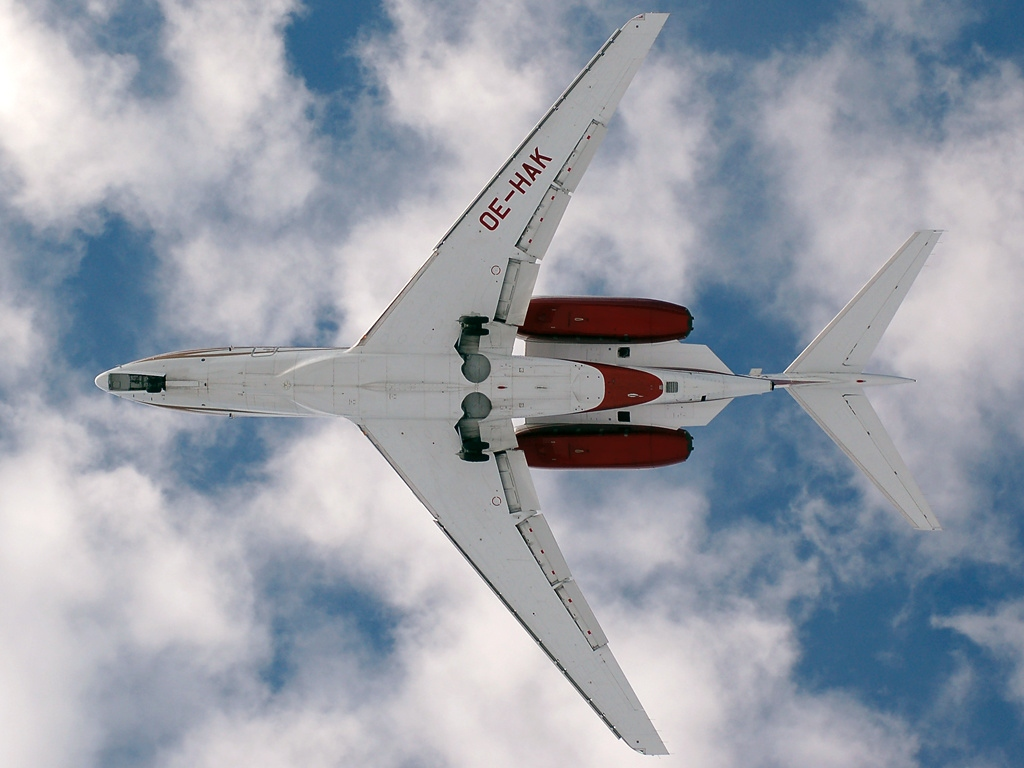
Planform view showing the high 37° sweepback

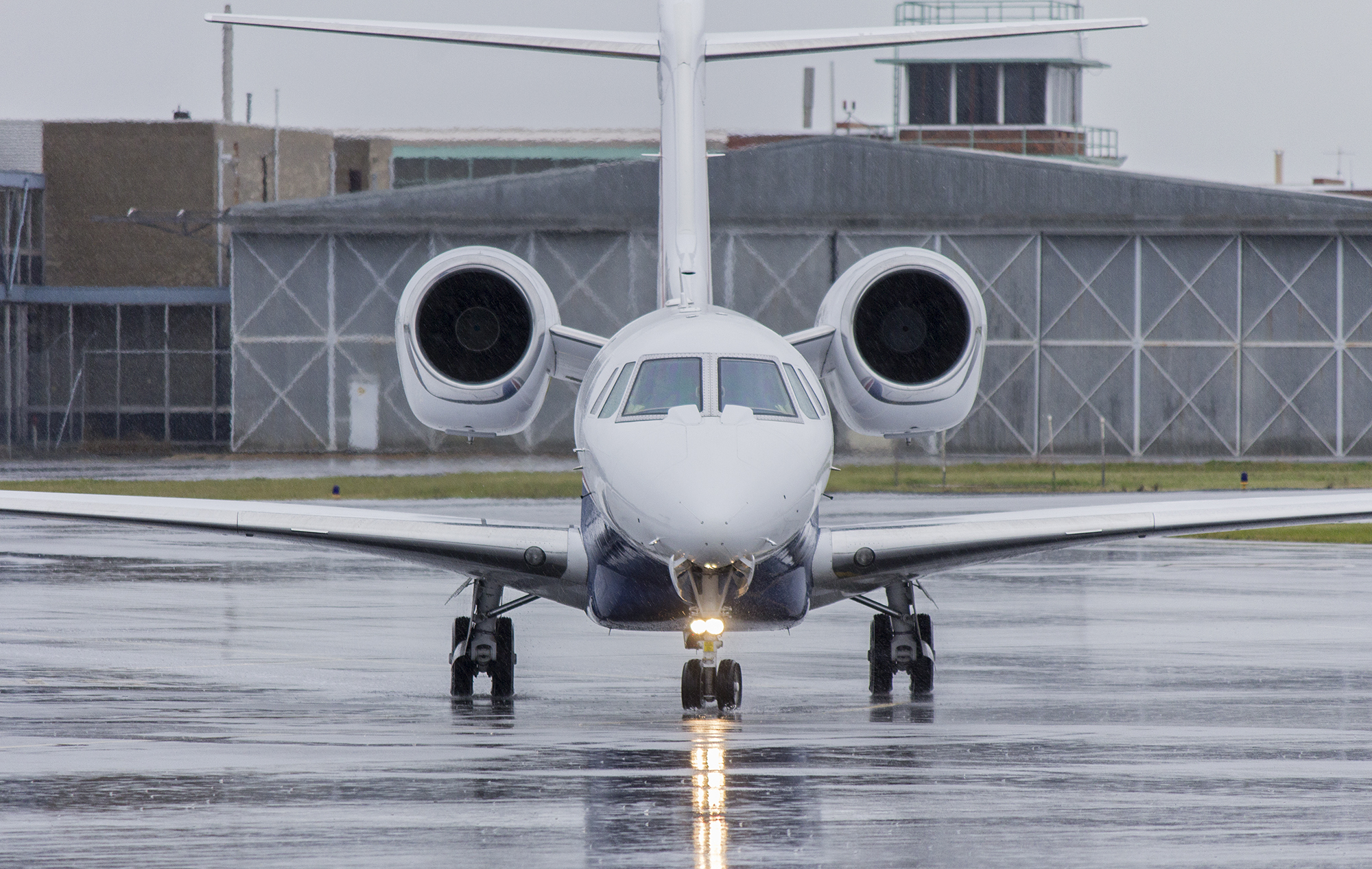
Front view with large engine inlets

Variant	Citation X	Citation X+
Crew	2	
Passengers	Up to 12	
Length	72.53 ft (22.04 m)	73 ft 7 in (22.43 m)
Span	63.6 ft (19.39 m)	69 ft 2 in (21.08 m)
Height	19.2 ft (5.85 m)	19 ft 3 in (5.87 m)
Wing area	527 sq ft (48.96 m^{2})	
Empty weight		22,131 lb (10,038 kg)
Max. takeoff weight	35,700-36,100 lb (16,193-16,375 kg)	36,600 lb (16,600 kg)
Fuel capacity	13,000 lb (5,897 kg)	
Turbofans	2 × AE3007C/C1	2 × AE3007C2
Thrust	2 × 6442-6764 lbf (28.66-30.09 kN)	2 × 7,034 lbf (31.29 kN)
Max speed	Mach .92 (529 kn; 608 mph; 979 km/h)	Mach .935 (995 km/h; 618 mph; 537 kn)
Cruise speed	525 kn (604 mph; 972 km/h)	
Minimum control speed	114 kn (131 mph; 211 km/h)	
Range	3,460 nmi (3,980 mi; 6,410 km)	
Ceiling	51,000 ft (15,545 m)	
Time to altitude	24 min to Flight level 470	

== See also ==
Related development

- Cessna Citation series

Aircraft of comparable role, configuration, and era

- Gulfstream G200
- Cessna Citation Sovereign
- Challenger 300
- Dassault Falcon 50
- Embraer Legacy 450/500 and Praetor 500/600
- Embraer Legacy 600 / 650
- Raytheon Hawker 4000
