= Rolls-Royce T406 =

Rolls-Royce North America turboshaft aircraft engine (1986)

T406 / AE 1107
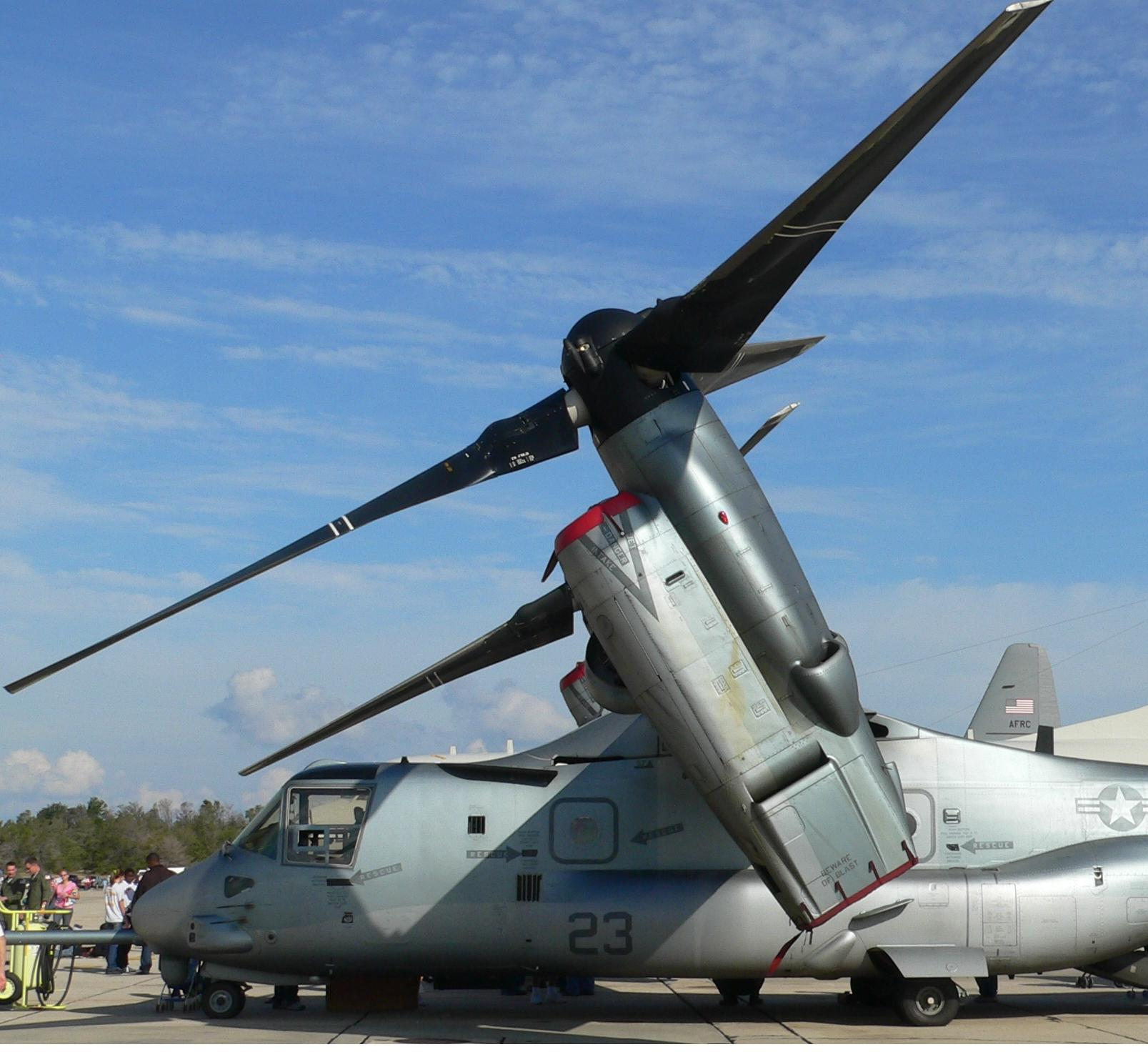
- A T406 engine nacelle on a V-22
- Type: Turboshaft
- National origin: United States
- Manufacturer: Allison Engine Company; Rolls-Royce Holdings
- First run: November 1986
- Major applications: Bell Boeing V-22 Osprey
- Number built: 860 (2018)
- Developed from: Allison T56/T701
- Developed into: Rolls-Royce AE 2100; Rolls-Royce AE 3007

The Rolls-Royce T406 (company designation AE 1107) is a turboshaft engine developed by Allison Engine Company (now part of Rolls-Royce) that powers the Bell Boeing V-22 Osprey tiltrotor. The engine delivers 6,000 shp (4,500 kW).

== Development ==
In 1982, Detroit Diesel Allison (DDA) prepared a new engine design to enter the United States Army's Modern Technology Demonstrator Engine (MTDE) competition, which was expected to be developed into the powerplant for the United States Navy's JVX experimental tiltrotor aircraft program (which would eventually become the Bell Boeing V-22 Osprey). After this engine, which DDA called the Model 580, lost the competition to Pratt & Whitney and General Electric in 1983, Allison was separated from Detroit Diesel as a separate division within General Motors, and Allison's new management decided to pursue the V-22 engine contract anyway.

On 24 December 1985, the U.S. Navy selected Allison's engine for full-scale engine development and production on the U.S. Marine Corps's V-22 Osprey. Before the engine was given its United States military aircraft engine designation of T406, it was known as the Model 501-M80C. The Navy and Allison signed a formal contract on 2 May 1986, and the first engine to test ran six months after.

The T406 is based on the Allison T56 turboprop from the P-3 and the C-130, with the free power turbine of the Allison T701 turboshaft from the defunct Heavy Lift Helicopter program. It was selected over the Pratt & Whitney PW3000 and General Electric GE27 competing for the US Army's Modern Technology Demonstrator Engine program. The T406 began flight testing on 19 March 1989.

The T406/AE 1107C Liberty shares a common core with the AE 3007 turbofan and AE 2100 turboprop series of engines, both of which have sold in the thousands of copies. 44–46 percent of parts are common between the T406 and the AE 3007, while about 76 percent of parts are common between the T406 and the AE 2100. In addition, Allison attempted to develop other types of engines based on the T406. In 1988, the company signed a memorandum of understanding (MoU) with Messerschmitt-Bölkow-Blohm (MBB) of West Germany and the China National Aero-Technology Import & Export Corporation (CATIC) to work on a version of the MPC 75 regional aircraft to be powered by a T406-derived propfan. In 1990, Allison studied a 9,000 shp (6,700 kW) propfan powerplant driving 8.5 ft diameter (2.6 m) contra-rotating propellers to power Euroflag's proposed military airlift aircraft. Also, the MT7 gas turbines that will be used to power the Ship-to-Shore Connector are a derived design of the T406.

Production continued by Rolls-Royce after it acquired Allison in 1995 to establish a North American subsidiary. In 2009, the Government Accountability Office (GAO) found that the engines failed after less than 400 hours of service, as compared to the estimated life of 500–600 hours. Multiple updates to the engine platform in 2012–2013 have increased the lifespan significantly.

In April 2012, the United States Department of Defense (DoD) ordered 70 AE 1107C engines for the Osprey, with options for up to 268 engines.

Rolls-Royce introduced a "Block 3" turbine upgrade, which replaced the old turbine design with sturdier and more efficient components. The upgrade increased engine power by at least 17 percent, and the engine achieved a power output of over 8,800 shp (6,600 kW) during ground testing. The Block 3 turbine became standard in July 2012 for new production models. By September 2012, all older engines that were undergoing regular maintenance were systematically upgraded to the Block 3 turbine.

Engines with a future planned "Block 4" upgrade would be expected to deliver nearly 10,000 horsepower (7,500 kilowatts).

An ongoing problem with the engines was their propensity for surging or stalling with 68 incidents reported between 2003 and October 2016, though this rate had reduced after the introduction of the Block 3 engine version. The US Naval Air Systems Command intends to award Rolls-Royce two contracts to examine the effectiveness of proposed reliability improvements. The first is an update to the engine management software that changes how it controls the compressor guide vanes, as internal testing suggested that this could improve the engine's surge margin by 0.8% at sea level and 3% at altitude. The second is the discovery that a temperature sensor at the inlet of the compressor sends incorrect readings leading to 2.5% out of 4% steady power shortfall at the compressors correct rotational speed, again correctable with a software fix. In addition, Bell Boeing is developing an inlet barrier system to reduce the power loss from the engine ingesting dust and sand particles to supplement the engines existing centrifugal based particle separators as they can only do so much to improve the quality of air they receive.

=== AE 1107F ===
In October 2021, Bell and Rolls-Royce jointly announced that the Bell MV-75 powerplant would switch from the General Electric T64 turboshaft used on the prototype to a derivative of the 1107C used on the Osprey, which would be named the 1107F. The 1107C is a known element in tiltrotor aircraft with its two decades of prior use which lowers sustainment costs and lowers risk associated with the project, and the 1107F increases the engine's power output from 5,000 to 7,000 horsepower.

In December 2025, Rolls-Royce began engine testing on the AE 1107F at its facility in Indianapolis.

== Design ==
On the V-22, the T406 engines are housed in wing-tip tilting nacelles, allowing the distinctive flight characteristics of the V-22. For takeoff and landing the nacelles are directed vertically (90° to fuselage), while for forward flight they are rotated parallel to fuselage. The engine has been considered as a cost-effective upgrade for existing heavylift helicopters such as the CH-47 Chinook and the CH-53.

== Applications ==
- Aurora XV-24 LightningStrike (1107C)
- Bell Boeing V-22 Osprey (1107C Liberty)
- Bell MV-75 (1107F)
- US Navy Ship-to-Shore Connector Landing Craft (MT7)

== Specifications (T406) ==
==== General characteristics ====
- Type: Free-turbine turboshaft
- Length: 78.1 in (1,980 mm)
- Diameter: 34.2 in (890 mm)
- Dry weight: 971 lb (440 kg)

==== Components ====
- Compressor: 14-stage high pressure axial compressor, variable geometry vanes in the inlet and the first 5 stages
- Combustors: Diffuser annular combustor with 16 air-blast fuel nozzles and 2 igniters
- Turbine: 2-stage high pressure turbine with air-cooling in the first and second-stage vanes and the first-stage blade; 2-stage shrouded power turbine with uncooled vanes and blades

==== Performance ====
- Maximum power output: 6,150 hp (4,586 kW) takeoff and 5,890 hp (4,392 kW) continuous at 15,000 rpm
- Overall pressure ratio: 16.7:1
- Turbine inlet temperature: 1,209 °C (2,208 °F; 1,482 K; 2,668 °R)
- Specific fuel consumption: 0.426 lb/shp/hr (0.259 kg/kW/hr) SFC, efficiency 32%
- Power-to-weight ratio: 6.33 shp/lb (10.4 kW/kg)

== See also ==
Related development

- Allison T56/T701
- Rolls-Royce AE 2100
- Rolls-Royce AE 3007

Comparable engines

- General Electric GE38
- Lycoming T55

Related lists

- List of aircraft engines
