= Rolls-Royce AE 2100 =

Turboprop aircraft engine family

AE 2100
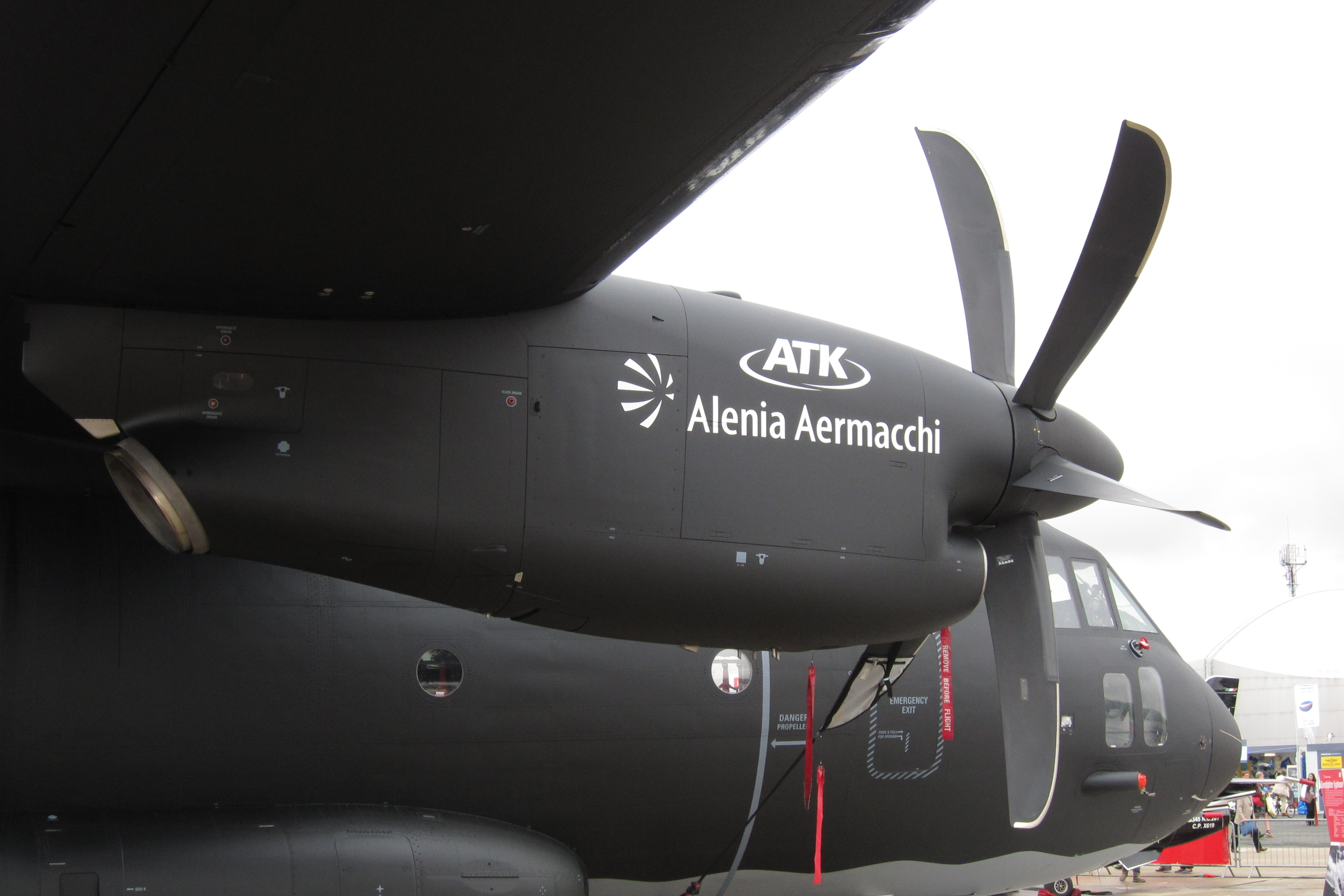
- The Rolls-Royce AE 2100 D2A on a C-27J
- Type: Turboprop
- National origin: United States
- Manufacturer: Allison Engine Company; Rolls-Royce plc
- Major applications: Alenia C-27J Spartan; Lockheed Martin C-130J Hercules; Saab 2000; ShinMaywa US-2
- Number built: 2,300+
- Developed from: Rolls-Royce T406

The Rolls-Royce AE 2100 is a turboprop developed by Allison Engine Company, now part of Rolls-Royce North America. The engine was originally known as the GMA 2100, when Allison was a division of former corporate parent General Motors.

== Development ==
On 11 July 1989, Saab-Scania A.B. selected the GMA 2100 to power its new Saab 2000, a 50-seat stretch of the Saab 340 turboprop, in a US$500 million deal. In July 1990, Industri Pesawat Terbang Nusantara (IPTN) of Indonesia picked the GMA 2100 as the engine for the twin-engine N-250 regional airliner. Flight testing with a 13 ft 6 in diameter (4.11 m) Dowty R373 propeller on a Lockheed P-3 Orion testbed aircraft began on 23 August 1990, and finished after over 50 hours of flight and ground testing.

The GMA 2100D3 became the powerplant for the Lockheed Martin C-130J Super Hercules. It made its first test flight on 19 March 1994, which was conducted by Marshall Aerospace on a Lockheed C-130K Hercules testbed leased from the Royal Air Force. Testing ended in June 1994 after 47 flight hours. The engine powered the initial flight of the C-130J aircraft on 5 April 1996. By April 1997, the D3 variant had received Federal Aviation Administration (FAA) type certification. 2,000 of the D3 variants have been delivered as of 2018.

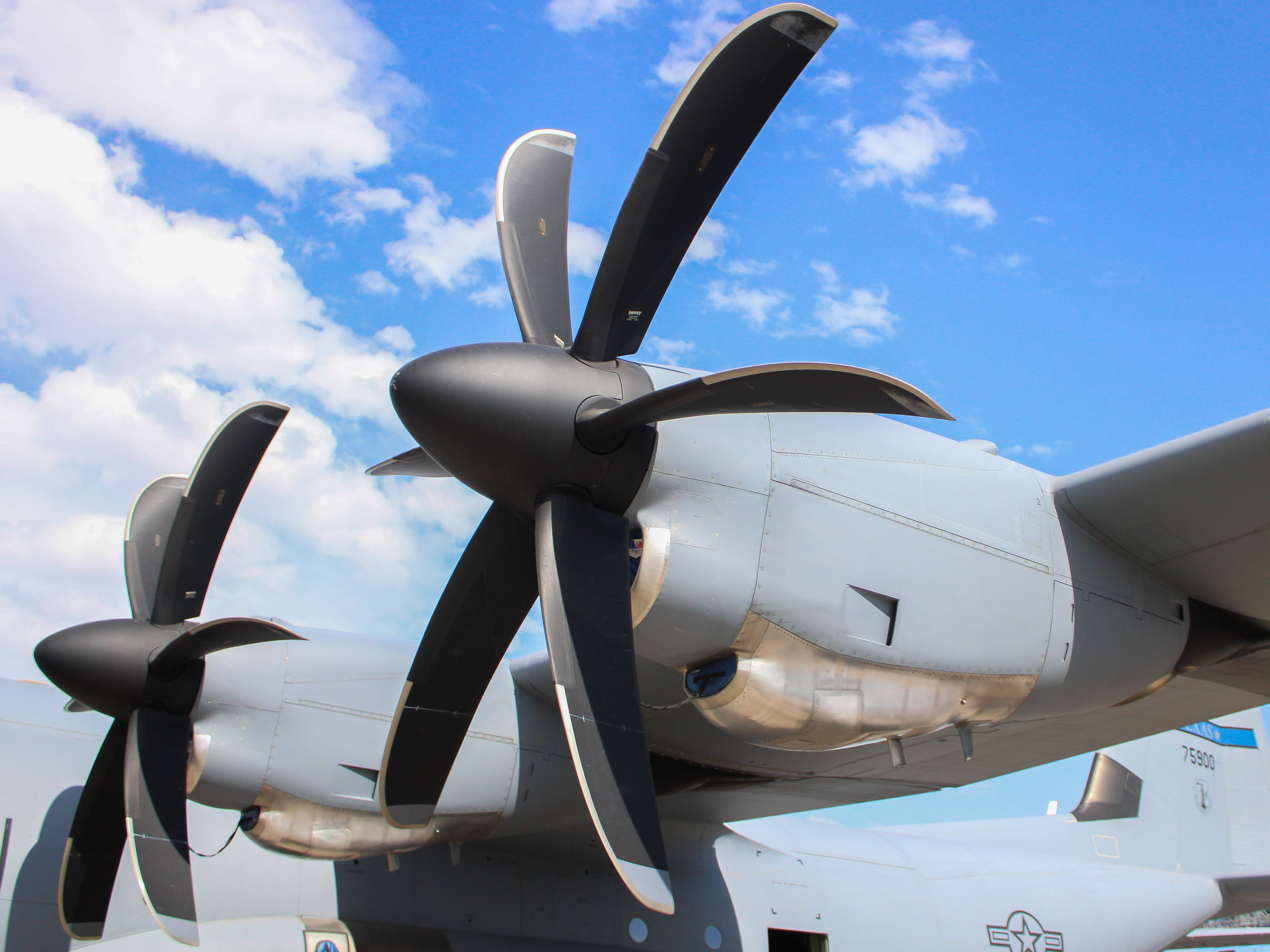
An AE2100D3 on a Lockheed Martin C-130J-30

The engine's C variant was certified on 20 December 1993. It powered the N-250 prototype's first flight on 10 August 1995, but the N-250 aircraft program was postponed indefinitely in the late 1990s due to the Asian financial crisis.

In June 1997, the AE 2100 was selected by Lockheed Martin and Alenia to power the C-27J Spartan tactical airlifter. In October 2015, Alenia announced plans to use a 5,100-horsepower (3,800-kilowatt) uprated version of the AE 2100 as the baseline engine by 2017.

As of 7 August 2025, Rolls-Royce also plans to establish an MRO facility in India to service the AE 2100 engines in service with the Indian Air Force's C-130J fleet. The project is also intended to enhance the C-130J’s capabilities, thereby strengthening its prospects for the Indian Air Force’s Medium Transport Aircraft program.

== Design ==
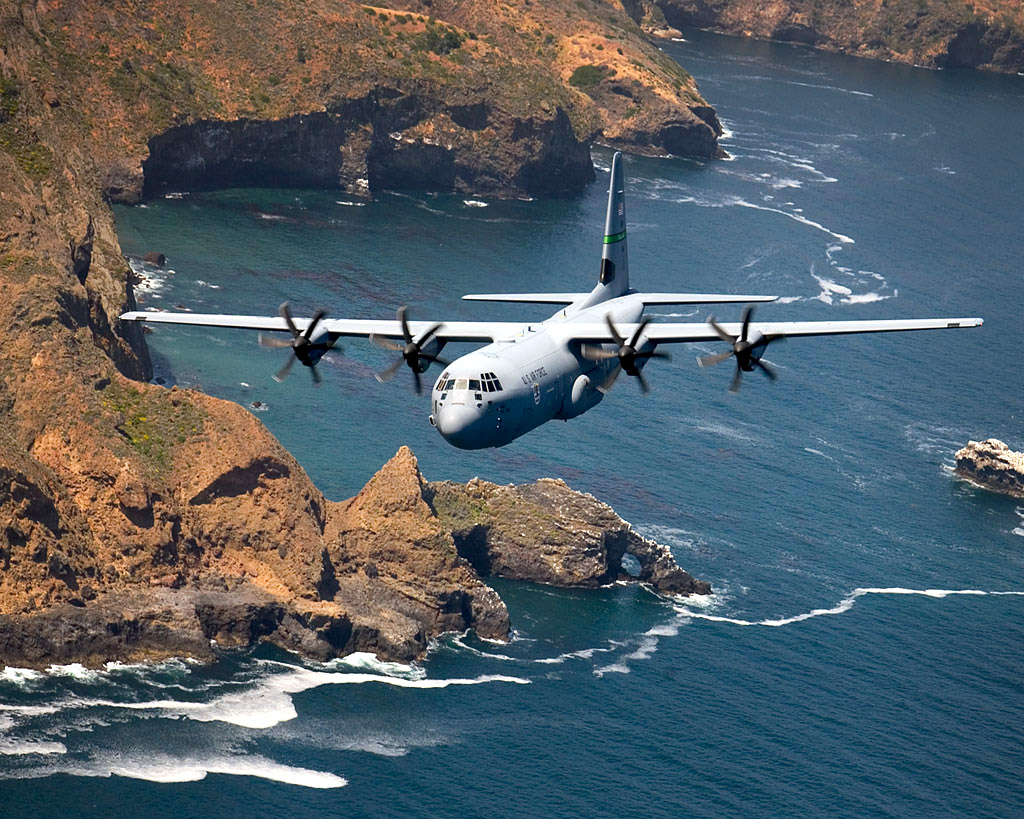
C-130J Hercules with six-bladed props

A derivative of the Allison AE 1107C-Liberty (Rolls-Royce T406) turboshaft engine, the AE 2100 shares the same high-pressure core as that engine, as does the Rolls-Royce AE 3007 turbofan. This core is capable of powering turboprops of up to 10,000 shp (7,500 kW). The AE 2100 is a two-shaft design, and it was the first to use dual FADECs (full authority digital engine control) to control both engine and propeller, allowing both to be adjusted with a single lever. There are four production variants of the engine: the civil AE 2100A, and the military variants which include the AE 2100D2/D2A, AE 2100D3, AE 2100J and AE 2100P.

The AE 2100 inherited the Allison T56's 14-stage axial compressor design, but the inlet and the stator for the first five stages have variable blades. The annular combustor has 16 air-blast fuel injection nozzles. The turbine that drives the compressor has two stages, with the first stage using single-crystal blades. A free power turbine with two stages drives the propeller through an inner shaft and a gearbox. The engine has replaceable steel blades and vanes, which are more reliable but heavier than titanium.

The AE 2100 engine and gearbox are rated at 6,000 shaft horsepower (4,500 kilowatts), but was derated to 4,200, 4,590, and 3,600 shp (3,130, 3,420, and 2,680 kW) for the Saab 2000, Lockheed Martin C-130J Super Hercules, and IPTN N-250, respectively. The engine uses six-bladed, all-composite blade Dowty propellers, including the model R381 on the Saab 2000, R414 on the ShinMaywa US-2, R384 on the IPTN N-250, and R391 on the C-130J military transport and the LM-100J civil-certified version of the C-130J. The gearbox has a reduction ratio of about 14 and a mean time before unscheduled removal (MTBUR) of over 35,000 hours.

== Variants and applications ==
AE 2100A

- Lockheed P-3 Orion (testbed)
- Saab 2000

AE 2100C

- IPTN N-250 (prototype only)

AE 2100D2A

- Alenia C-27J Spartan

AE 2100D3

- Lockheed C-130K Hercules (testbed)
- Lockheed Martin C-130J Super Hercules
- Lockheed Martin LM-100J

AE 2100F
A variant proposed in 1995 and paired with Dowty R394 propellers to retrofit the Allison T56-powered Lockheed C-130 models E through H and Lockheed L-100-30, at a price after engine/propeller trade-in of USD11 million per aircraft.
AE 2100G
A variant offered in 1994 for the proposed ATR 82, a twin-turboprop airliner seating up to 86 passengers and requiring about 5,000 hp (3,700 kW) of power.
AE 2100H
A variant offered in 1996 for Dassault Aviation's proposed Atlantic Third Generation (ATL3G) maritime patrol aircraft (MPA).
AE 2100J
A hybrid of the AE 2100A and AE 2100D3, sporting the torque-meter and interconnecting struts from the AE 2100A and the gearbox-mounted accessory gearbox from the AE 2100D3; also uses a stronger reduction gearbox, a Dowty six-bladed propeller for higher loads, and modified inlet and bypass section positioning to mitigate seawater ingestion; powers the ShinMaywa US-2.
AE 2100P

- Saab 2000 AEW&C

AE 2100SD-7
A variant proposed in 1994 for the European Future Large Aircraft (which eventually became the Airbus A400M), with the required power increase from 6,000 to 10,000 shp (4,500 to 7,500 kW) estimated to cost USD600 million.

== Specifications (AE 2100D3) ==
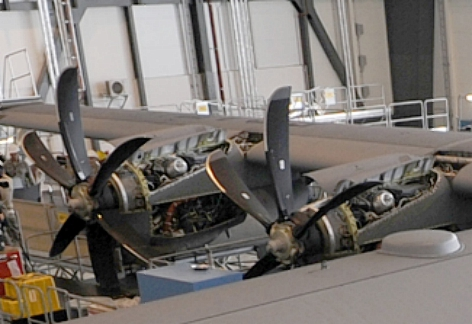
The AE 2100D3 engines of a US Air Force C-130J Hercules ready for inspection at Ramstein Air Base, Germany

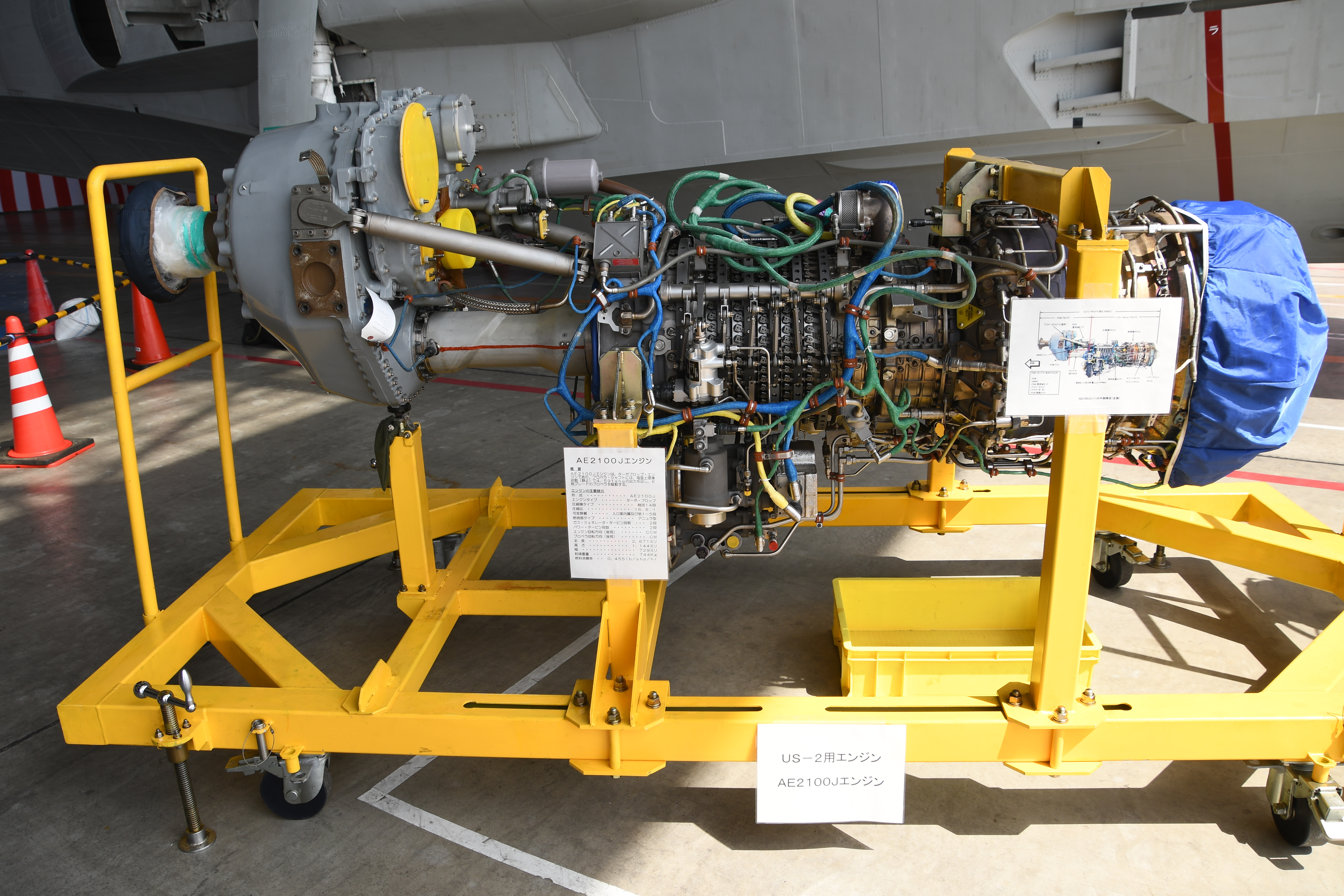
A side view of the AE 2100J engine without its casing, on display at Marine Corps Air Station Iwakuni in 2019

Data from FAA type certificate data sheet no. TE1CH.

==== General characteristics ====
- Type: Free-turbine turboprop engine
- Length: 124.12 in (315.3 cm)
- Diameter: 28.71 in (72.9 cm)
- Dry weight: 1,740 lb (790 kg)

==== Components ====
- Compressor: 14-stage axial
- Combustors: Annular
- Turbine: 2-stage HP, 2-stage PT

==== Performance ====
- Maximum power output: 4,637 shp (3,458 kW)
- Overall pressure ratio: 16.6:1
- Air mass flow: 36 lb/s (16.3 kg/s)
- Specific fuel consumption: Takeoff: 0.460 lb/(hp⋅h) (0.209 kg/(hp⋅h); 0.280 kg/kWh)
- Power-to-weight ratio: 2.76 shp/lb (4.54 kW/kg)

== See also ==
Related development

- Allison T56
- Rolls-Royce AE 3007
- Rolls-Royce T406

Comparable engines

- General Electric GE38
- Pratt & Whitney Canada PW150

Related lists

- List of aircraft engines

== Bibliography ==
- Leyes II, Richard A.; William A. Fleming (1999). The History of North American Small Gas Turbine Aircraft Engines. Washington, DC: Smithsonian Institution. ISBN 1-56347-332-1. OCLC 247550535.
- Moxon, Julian; Winn, Allan; Elliott, Simon; Barrie, Douglas (11 December 1991). "Quiet revolution". Flight International. Vol. 140, no. 4297. pp. S10+. ISSN 0015-3710. Gale A11714309.
- Kandebo, Stanley W. (19 February 1990). "Allison plans flight tests of turboprop GMA 2100". Cover story. Aviation Week & Space Technology. Vol. 132, no. 8. pp. 36–38. ISSN 0005-2175.
