= Rolls-Royce AE 3007 =

Turbofan aircraft engine family

AE 3007
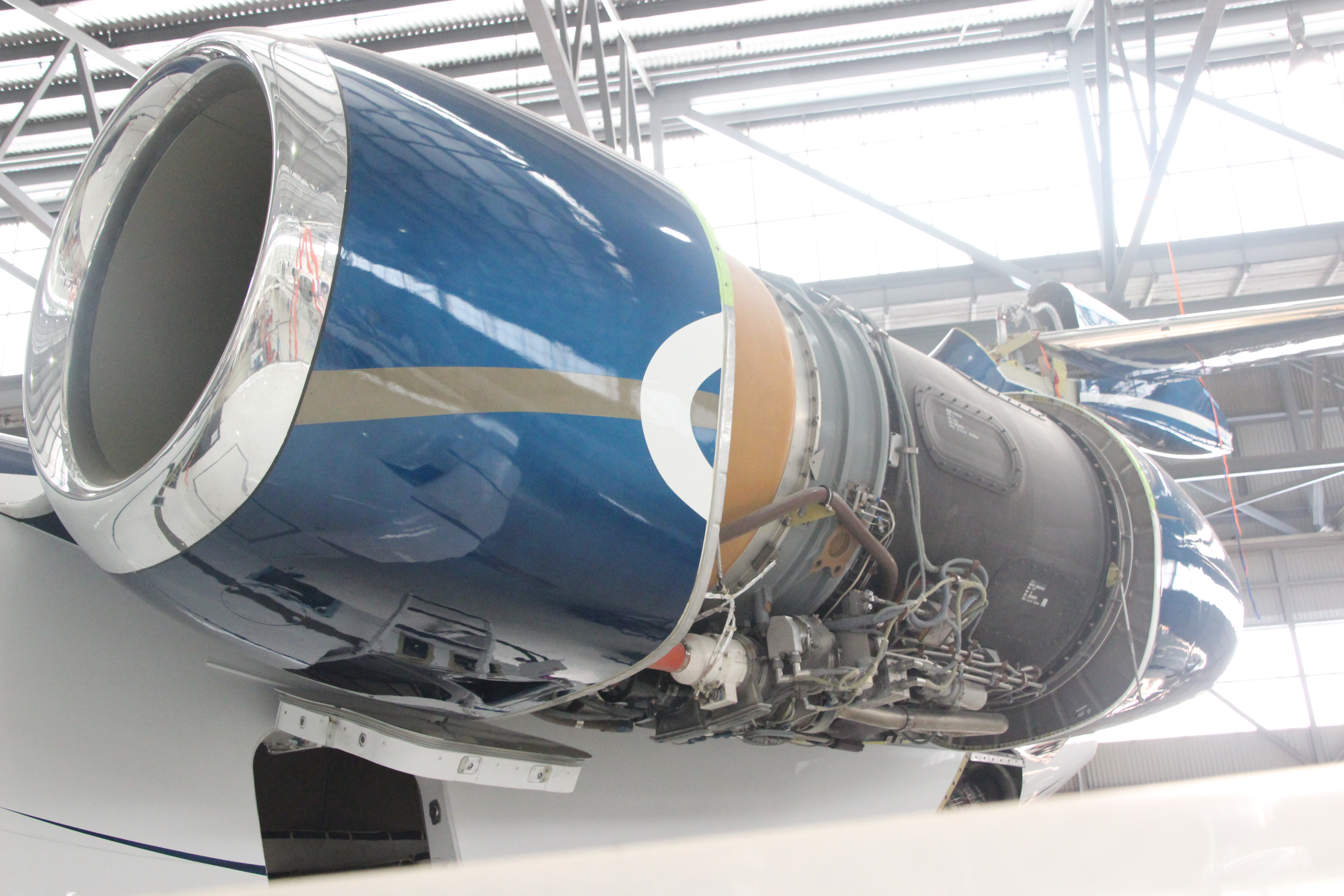
- AE 3007 on a Cessna Citation X
- Type: Turbofan
- National origin: United States
- Manufacturer: Allison Engine Company; Rolls-Royce North America
- First run: 1991
- Major applications: Boeing MQ-25 Stingray; Cessna Citation X Embraer ERJ family Northrop Grumman RQ-4 Global Hawk; Northrop Grumman MQ-4C Triton
- Number built: 3,400+
- Developed from: Rolls-Royce T406

The Rolls-Royce AE 3007 (US military: F137) is a turbofan engine produced by Rolls-Royce North America, sharing a common core with the Rolls-Royce T406 (AE 1107) and AE 2100. The engine was originally developed by the Allison Engine Company, hence the "AE" in the model number.

== Development ==
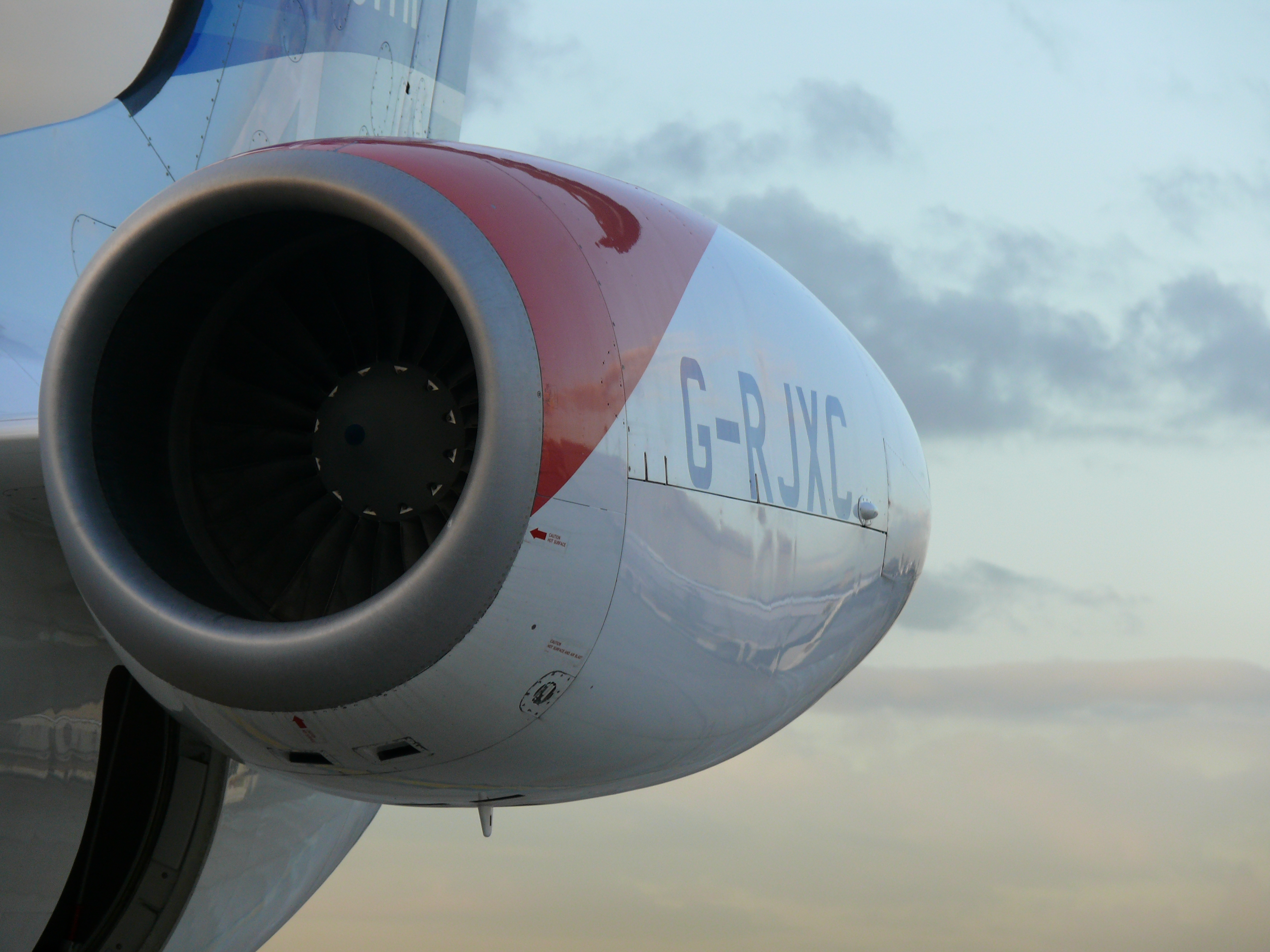
AE 3007 on an Embraer ERJ 145

In 1988, Allison Engine Company (then owned by General Motors) and Rolls-Royce plc began joint studies of a 33 kN (7,400 lb_{f}) RB580 to power the proposed Short Brothers FJX regional jet, combining the T406 core with a Rolls-Royce low-pressure spool. By late 1989, amid growing importance of the Rolls-Royce Trent engine and uncertainty over the Short Brothers project, Rolls-Royce quit. Allison Engine Company pursued the engine alone, revising the design as a new wide-chord snubberless (or clapperless) titanium fan and low-pressure turbine.

On March 23, 1990, Allison's GMA 3007 was selected to power the Embraer EMB-145 regional jet. In September 1990, it was selected for the Cessna Citation X. The engine was first ground tested in mid-1991. On August 21, 1992, the engine had its first test flight on a Cessna Citation VII testbed aircraft. In 1995, Rolls-Royce bought Allison Engine Company and the engine had its first flight on the EMB-145. The Citation X AE3007C, producing 28.655 kN (6,442 lbf), was certificated by the FAA in February 1995; while the EMB-145 AE3007A, producing 39 kN (8,800 lbf), was certificated in mid-1996.

In 1995, Teledyne Ryan selected the AE3007H for the Tier II+ unmanned surveillance aircraft (now the Northrop Grumman RQ-4 Global Hawk), which required long-endurance at up to 70,000 ft (21,000 m). It was tested at these altitudes in February 1996 at the Arnold Engineering Development Center in Tennessee and the first was delivered in May 1996.

More than 3,400 engines have been delivered. In 2014, 2,976 civil engines were installed. In 2017, the AE 3007 in the ERJ family had flown over 53 million hours and over 44 million cycles. It was flown for more than 60 million hours. The engine is manufactured at the Rolls-Royce North America engine plant in Indianapolis, Indiana.

== Design ==
The AE 3007 is a direct drive turbofan engine with a single stage fan, a 14-stage axial compressor with 6 stages of variable vanes including inlet guide vanes, an annular combustor, a two-stage high pressure turbine and a 3-stage low pressure turbine. The accessory gearbox is mounted at its bottom and two single channel FADEC units are mounted in the aircraft. It has fore and aft mounting provisions for underwing pylon or aft fuselage installation. The AE 3007 has a thrust-specific fuel consumption (TSFC) of 0.36 lb/(lbf⋅h) (10 g/(kN⋅s)) at static sea level takeoff and 0.65 lb/(lbf⋅h) (18 g/(kN⋅s)) at a cruise speed of Mach 0.8 and altitude of 35,010 ft (10,670 m). The engine's A variant was designed to produce a cruise thrust of 6.3 kN (640 kgf; 1,420 lbf) at Mach 0.8 and 41,000 ft (12,000 m) altitude.

== Variants ==
AE 3007C, C1, C2

- Cessna Citation X

AE 3007A, A1, A1/1, A1/3, A3, A1P, A1E, A2

- Embraer ERJ family
- Embraer Legacy 600
- Embraer R-99

AE 3007G
Proposed powerplant for the 48-50 seat Fairchild Dornier 528JET
AE 3007H (F137)

- Northrop Grumman RQ-4 Global Hawk
- Northrop Grumman MQ-4C Triton

AE 3007N

- Boeing MQ-25 Stingray

GMA 3008
A proposed 8,000 lbf (36 kN; 3,600 kgf) thrust variant with a 38.5 in (98 cm) diameter fan
AE3009
A proposed 9,000 lbf (40 kN; 4,100 kgf) thrust version with a new high-pressure turbine ceramic-matrix composite tailcone
GMA 3010 / AE 3010
A 10,000 lbf (44.5 kN; 4,540 kgf) thrust variant, which was to power the Yakovlev Yak-77 twin-engine business jet as a derated variant of the GMA 3012 with a 44 in diameter (112 cm) fan
GMA 3012 / AE 3012
A proposed 12,000 lbf (53 kN; 5,400 kgf) thrust variant with a 44 in diameter (112 cm) fan, two-stage intermediate compressor, an extra stage in the low pressure turbine, and an advanced high pressure turbine
GMA 3014 / GMA 3014 ADV
A proposed variant targeted toward the Regioplane consortium's 80-130-seat Regioliner RL 92/RL 122 (the successor to the MPC 75), with a 55 in diameter (140 cm) fan, 14,000–20,000 lbf (62–89 kN; 6,400–9,100 kgf) of thrust, a new eight-stage compressor, dual-bank combustor, and a four-stage low pressure turbine

== Applications ==
- Boeing MQ-25 Stingray
- Cessna Citation X
- Embraer ERJ family
- Embraer Legacy 600
- Embraer R-99
- Northrop Grumman RQ-4 Global Hawk
- Northrop Grumman MQ-4C Triton

== Specifications ==
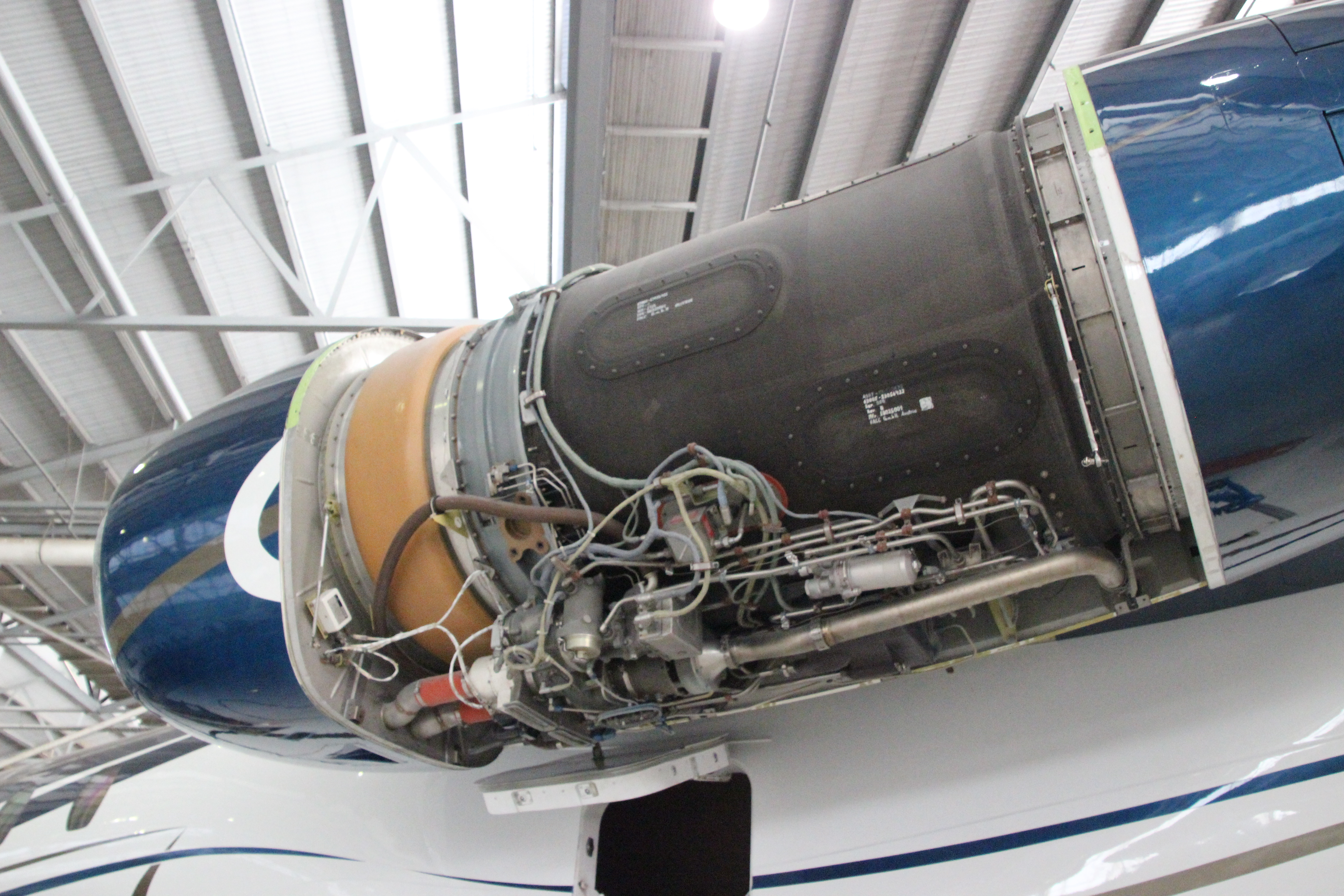
Undergoing maintenance

AE 3007 data sheet
| Variant | AE 3007C | AE 3007A |
| Compressor | Single-stage fan and 14-stage axial HP | |
| Fan | 24 blades, 38.5 in (98 cm) diameter | |
| Combustor | Annular | |
| Turbine | 2-stage HP, 3-stage LP | |
| Takeoff thrust | 6,442–7,042 lbf (28.66–31.32 kN) | 7,580–9,500 lbf (33.7–42.3 kN) |
| Fan shaft rpm | 7,344–7,518 | 7,716–8,248 |
| Gas generator rpm | 15,196–15,452 | 15,452–16,245 |
| Length | 115.08 in (292.3 cm) | |
| Width | 46.14 in (117.2 cm) | |
| Height | 55.70 in (141.5 cm) | |
| Weight | 1,614–1,641 lb (732–744 kg) | 1,657–1,681 lb (752–762 kg) |
| Thrust to weight | 4–4.3 | 4.6–5.6 |
| TSFC_{SSL} | | 0.36 lb/(lbf⋅h) (10 g/(kN⋅s)) |
| Interstage Turbine Temperature | 888–907 °C (1,630–1,665 °F) | 921–970 °C (1,690–1,778 °F) |
| Overall Pressure ratio | 23:1 | |
| Bypass ratio | 5:1 | |

== See also ==
Related development

- Rolls-Royce AE 2100
- Rolls-Royce T406 (AE 1107)

Comparable engines

- General Electric CF34
- Honeywell HTF7000
- Lycoming ALF 502
- Pratt & Whitney Canada PW300

Related lists

- List of aircraft engines
