= MPC 75 =

West German–Chinese regional propfan airliner

General information
- Type: Propfan regional airliner
- National origin: West Germany; People's Republic of China
- Manufacturer: Messerschmitt-Bölkow-Blohm; China National Aero-Technology Import & Export Corporation
- Status: Abandoned

The MPC 75 was a proposed type of aeroplane. Work on the project was done mainly between 1988 and 1992 in Hamburg, Germany. Predevelopment work was finished, however the project never made it into full development.

== Development ==
On 3 October 1985, Messerschmitt-Bölkow-Blohm (MBB) of West Germany signed a memorandum of understanding (MoU) with China National Aero-Technology Import & Export Corporation (CATIC) to jointly study the feasibility of an aircraft designated the MPC 75, a propfan-powered regional aircraft that would seat 60 to 80 passengers. On 6 June 1986, the companies agreed to another MoU during the 1986 Hanover ILA air show to start the second phase of feasibility studies. MBB also signed an MoU at that event with General Electric to determine whether its unducted fan (UDF) propulsion technology could be scaled down to power the MPC 75.

The results of the feasibility study were released internally in July 1987. It concluded that the MPC 75's baseline configuration met the technical and market requirements, which included the critical mission of Kunming, China to Chengdu, China. The feasibility study also declared that the General Electric's 42.8-kilonewton thrust (4,360-kilogram-force; 9,620-pound-force) GE38-B5 UDF was the only suitable engine investigated, with a takeoff thrust-specific fuel consumption of 6.8 grams per kilonewton per second (0.240 pounds per pound-force per hour), and a cruise SFC of 14.7 g/(kN⋅s) (0.519 lb/(lbf⋅h)) at Mach 0.8 and 11,000-metre altitude (35,000 ft). The baseline configuration had grown to seat about 75 passengers, with a potential stretched version holding about 100 passengers. The primary alternative engine studied was the 64 kN thrust (6,600 kgf; 14,500 lbf) PW–Allison 501-M80E, an engine proposed jointly by Pratt & Whitney and the Allison Engine Company, that was a propfan derivative of the Allison T406/501-M80C turboshaft engine selected for the V-22 Osprey tiltrotor aircraft. This engine was ruled out as too powerful, because it required the baseline aircraft configuration to be in the 90–110 seat range. However, at their respective baseline configurations, the 501-M80E had a superior specific fuel burn value of 0.0285 kg per nautical mile per seat, compared with the GE38-B5's 0.0324 kg/nmi/seat.

On 15 October 1987, MBB and CATIC signed an agreement to advance to the predevelopment phase of work on the aircraft. To plan for joint work, MBB and CATIC opened an office in Hamburg, West Germany in April 1988, and they targeted a finish to the predevelopment phase in 1990 before entering the production phase in Hamburg and Xi'an, China. In May 1988, MBB also signed an MoU with Allison to research supplying an engine for the MPC 75. The agreement would potentially power the MPC-75 with an engine derived from the T406 using a gearbox connected to contra-rotating propfans. However, alternative airframes and engine types such as turbofans and ducted propfans would also be investigated. On 31 October 1988, MBB and CATIC announced that they had founded a joint firm in Hamburg called the MPC-75 GmbH, which would administer all activities related to the aircraft. The firm had an ownership of 80 percent for MBB and 20 percent for CATIC.

The name "MPC" was formed from "MBB" and "People's Republic of China" because the project was a German - Chinese joint venture. In the wake of restructuring German aerospace companies in 1989, MBB was taken over and the MPC 75 project came under "Deutsche Airbus GmbH". "Deutsche Airbus GmbH" was representing the independent German part of the Airbus consortium. For the development of MPC 75 restructuring did not make a difference since the same engineers continued the design work.

On 07.01.1989 "MPC Aircraft Gesellschaft mit beschränkter Haftung" (HRB41092) - abbreviated to "MPC Aircraft GmbH" - was founded with head office in Hamburg. Eventually it became a 100% subsidiary of Deutsche Airbus GmbH. MPC Aircraft GmbH formally took over the MPC 75 project. On 13.12.1994 the company was renamed to MPCA Multi Purpose Commuter Aircraft GmbH reflecting the end of the German-Chinese cooperation. Abbreviated the company name remained MPC Aircraft GmbH.

The first design of the MPC 75 was a 75-seat (4 abreast) regional jet, with an open rotor propfan and a T-tail. In the later development, the design changed to an 89-seat (5 abreast) regional jet, with conventional turbofan engines and a conventional empennage (MPC 75–100). A stretched version with a capacity of 115 seats was also planned (MPC 75-200).

The fly-by-wire (FBW) flight control technology accumulated in the project was later fed into a research aircraft called Advanced Technology Demonstrator (ATD). The ATD was a revived VFW 614.

== Design ==
The MPC 75 was designed with a high amount of composite materials to save structural weight. Flight control was based on fly-by-wire with sides-sticks and CRT displays. The jet had two high bypass ratio engines. The new technologies would have led to low operational costs per trip and seat compared to other aircraft at that time.

== Specifications ==
Airplane Characteristics
Variant	MPC 75-100	MPC 75-200
Maximum take-off weight (MTOW)	39,950 kg (88,100 lb)	45,100 kg (99,400 lb)
Maximum landing weight (MLW)	37,950 kg (83,700 lb)	42,850 kg (94,450 lb)
Maximum zero-fuel weight (MZFW)	35,350 kg (77,950 lb)	41,000 kg (90,400 lb)
Operating empty weight (OEW)	24,500 kg (54,000 lb)	27,000 kg (59,500 lb)
Maximum structural payload	10,850 kg (23,950 lb)	14,000 kg (30,900 lb)
Maximum fuel capacity (outboard tanks)	10,450 L (2,760 US gal)	
Maximum fuel capacity (center section tanks)	5,000 L (1,320 US gal)	
Seats (typical two-class)	82	107
Seats (single class)	89	115
Cabin width (armrest level)	3.23 m (10 ft 7 in)	
Stowage volume (overhead)	6.54 m^{3} (231 cu ft)	8.75 m^{3} (309 cu ft)
Stowage volume (underfloor)	18.15 m^{3} (641 cu ft)	27.55 m^{3} (973 cu ft)
Wing area	92 m^{2} (990 sq ft)	
Wing span	29.7 m (97 ft 6 in)	
Height	10.2 m (33 ft 4 in)	
Length	28.5 m (93 ft 7 in)	33.6 m (110 ft 3 in)
Engine thrust (sea-level static)	62.3 kN (14,000 lbf; 6,350 kgf)	73.4 kN (16,500 lbf; 7,480 kgf)
Range (standard)	1,600 nmi (3,000 km; 1,800 mi)	1,400 nmi (2,600 km; 1,600 mi)
Range (with center wing fuel tank)	2,600 nmi (4,800 km; 3,000 mi)	
