= Progress D-27 =

Propfan engine

D-27
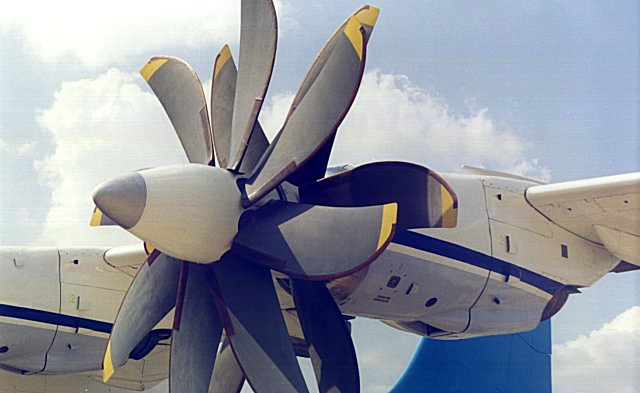
- Progress D-27 propfan engine installed on an Antonov An-70 military airlifter at the 1997 MAKS Air Show.
- Type: Propfan
- National origin: Soviet Union
- Manufacturer: Ivchenko-Progress (design); NPC Saljut and Motor Sich (manufacture); Aerosila (propeller and gearbox)
- First run: 1988
- Major applications: Antonov An-70; Antonov An-180; Beriev A-42
- Number built: 20 (2001)
- Developed from: Lotarev D-36

The Progress D-27 is a three-shaft propfan engine developed by Ivchenko Progress, and manufactured by Motor Sich in Ukraine. The gas generator was designed using experience from the Lotarev D-36 turbofan. The D-27 engine was designed to power more-efficient passenger aircraft such as the abandoned Yakovlev Yak-46 project, and it was chosen for the Antonov An-70 military transport aircraft. As of 2019, the D-27 is the only contra-rotating propfan engine to enter service.

== Design and development ==
The engine was launched in 1985 by the Ivchenko-Progress Design Bureau for commercial and military transport aircraft. It was designed to meet the expected growth in demand for new aero engines for civil and military applications. It has a take-off rating of 13,240 horsepower (9,870 kilowatts) for the Antonov An-70. Gunston lists ratings between 13,880 and 16,250 hp (10,350 and 12,120 kW) for the engine.

In 1990, the D-27 engine was proposed for the 150-162 seat Yakovlev Yak-46 airliner. This twin-engined derivative of the three-engine Yakovlev Yak-42 would mount the two D-27 engines on the rear fuselage. At the time, the D-27 had a 3.8-metre diameter (12-foot-6-inch) fan, produced 13,000 hp (9,700 kW) at takeoff resulting in a thrust of 11,200 kilograms-force (24,700 pounds-force; 110 kilonewtons), and had a thrust specific fuel consumption (SFC) of 13 g/(kN⋅s) (0.47 lb/(lbf⋅h)) at a cruise speed of 850 km/h (530 mph).

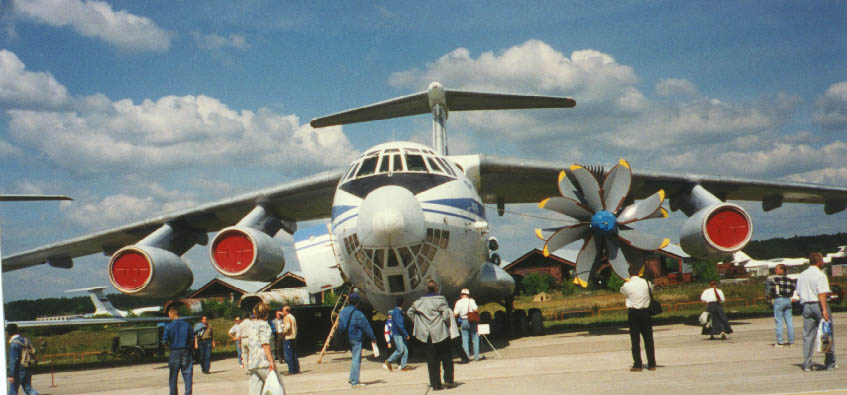
The Progress D-27 engine on the Ilyushin Il-76LL flying testbed at the 1997 MAKS air show.

A single prototype of the D-27 engine was used for flight testing on an Ilyushin Il-76 modified as a testbed aircraft since at least 1992, in preparation for use on the Antonov An-70T military transport aircraft. The version of the D-27 for the An-70T produced 13,800 hp (10,290 kW) and now had 4.5 m diameter (14 ft 9 in) propellers. In 1993, the Il-76LL testbed with D-27 engine was put on static display at Moscow's MAKS Air Show, and the next year it flew at the ILA Berlin Air Show and the Farnborough Air Show. The testbed configuration made a final appearance at the MAKS Air Show in 1997.

On December 16, 1994, four D-27 engines powered the first An-70 prototype on its maiden flight. This was the first aircraft flight ever to be completely powered by propfan engines. However, the prototype suffered a crash during its fourth flight in February 1995, destroying the aircraft and leaving no survivors. Antonov constructed a second prototype, which made its maiden flight on April 24, 1997 with four new D-27 engines. During its test program, the prototype also flew to the 1997 MAKS Air Show and the 1998 ILA Berlin Air Show.

The D-27's three-shaft gas turbine engine has an axial low-pressure compressor, a mixed-flow high-pressure compressor, an annular combustion chamber, a single-stage high-pressure turbine, and a single-stage low-pressure turbine. The SV-27 contra-rotating propfan, provided by SPE Aerosila, is driven by a four-stage turbine via a shaft connected to a planetary reduction gear which incorporates a thrust meter. The eight-bladed front propeller receives most of the engine power output and provides most of the thrust, while the back propeller has only six blades. The propellers rotate at 1,000 revolutions per minute (rpm) at takeoff and 850 rpm at cruise. The engine has an overall thermal efficiency of 37 percent.

On December 23, 2005, Antonov announced that the An-70-100 was awarded a noise certificate stating that the D-27-powered aircraft met Stage 3 noise regulations, which permitted international airlines to fly the aircraft unrestricted. In response to the US Stage 4 civil noise regulations adopted in 2006, the engine was modified in 2007 to reduce noise by increasing the separation between the front and back propellers. A further noise-related change in propeller spacing was made in 2010–2012, resulting in a 50-percent increase in separation from 0.60 to 0.90 metres (2.0 to 3.0 ft; 600 to 900 mm; 24 to 35 in).

The Ukrainian armed forces accepted the An-70 with D-27 engines into army service on January 19, 2015.

On September 3, 2019, the Russian navy decided to order Beriev A-42 amphibious aircraft, the development of which had been suspended in 1993. The expectation was that the aircraft would probably use two D-27 propfans as the powerplant. The initial order was for three aircraft, but no timeline was announced. Regardless, the Motor Sich engine manufacturing plant in Zaporizhzhia was destroyed by Russian forces in late May 2022 following the 2022 Russian invasion of Ukraine.

== Variants ==
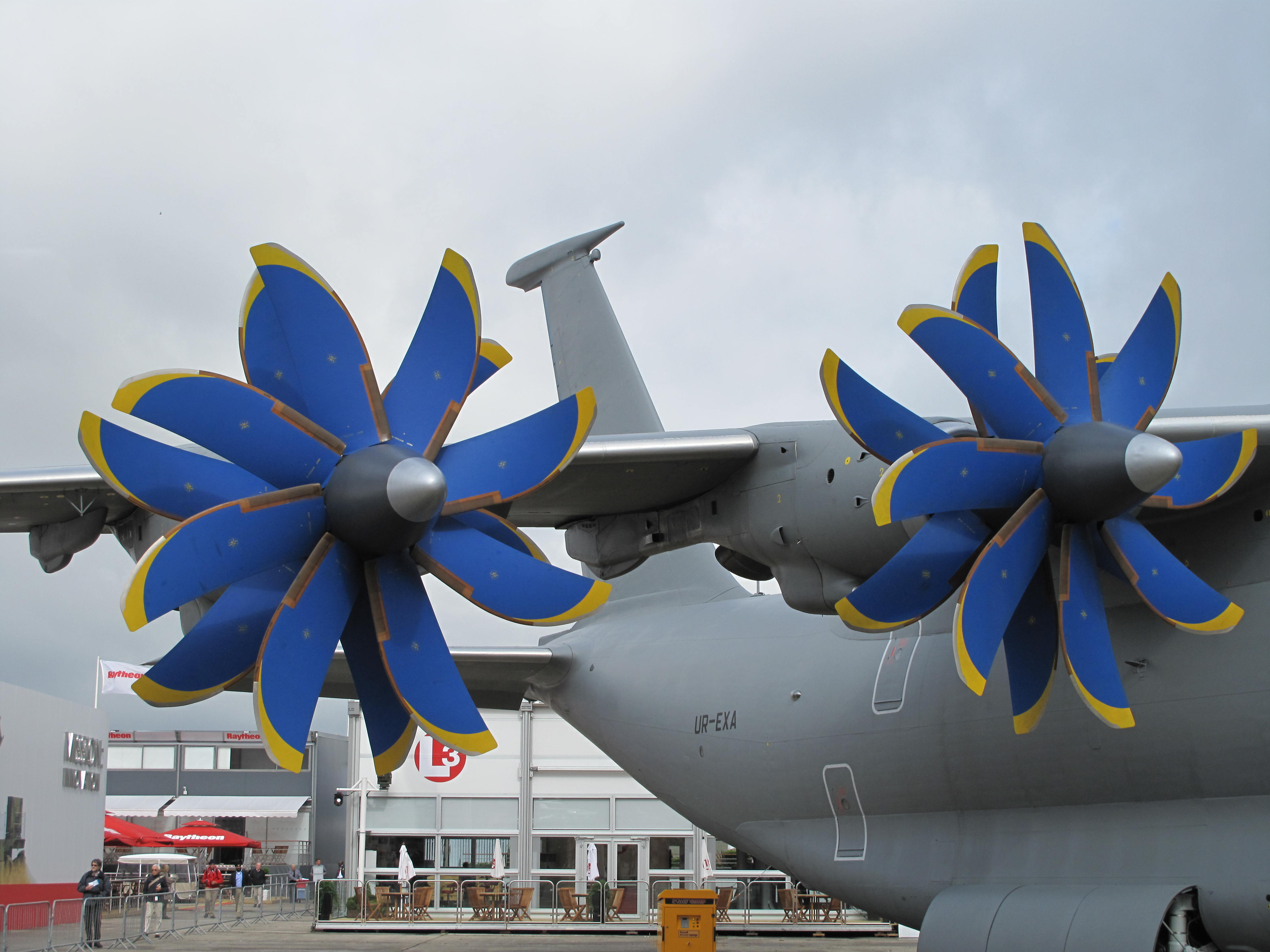
A front view of two Progress D-27 on the starboard wing of an Antonov An-70 aircraft at the 2013 Paris Air Show.

Ivchenko-Progress worked on derivatives based on the D-27 engine core, mostly within the 1988-1995 time frame. Proposals included the following designs:

D-27A
designation of the 14,000 hp (10,000 kW) engines for the Beriev A-42PE jet-powered search and rescue (SAR) amphibious aircraft, which was proposed in 1994.

D-27M
a 16,000 hp (12,000 kW) variant.

D-127
a turboshaft engine with a rated power of 14,500 hp (10,800 kW); intended to power the Mil Mi-26M heavy transport helicopter, with production targeted for 1998.

AI-127
a helicopter engine with an output rating of 14,500 hp (10,800 kW), derived from the D-27. The engine has a power SFC of 0.181 kg/(hp⋅h) (0.243 kg/kWh; 0.40 lb/(hp⋅h)) at takeoff and 0.210 kg/(hp⋅h) (0.282 kg/kWh; 0.46 lb/(hp⋅h)) at cruise.

D-227
an unducted propfan that could be gearless (direct-drive) or geared, with an output rating of 16,000 to 17,000 hp (12,000 to 13,000 kW). This engine was intended for the Antonov An-170, a derivative of the An-70, and it was proposed for the Tupolev Tu-334.

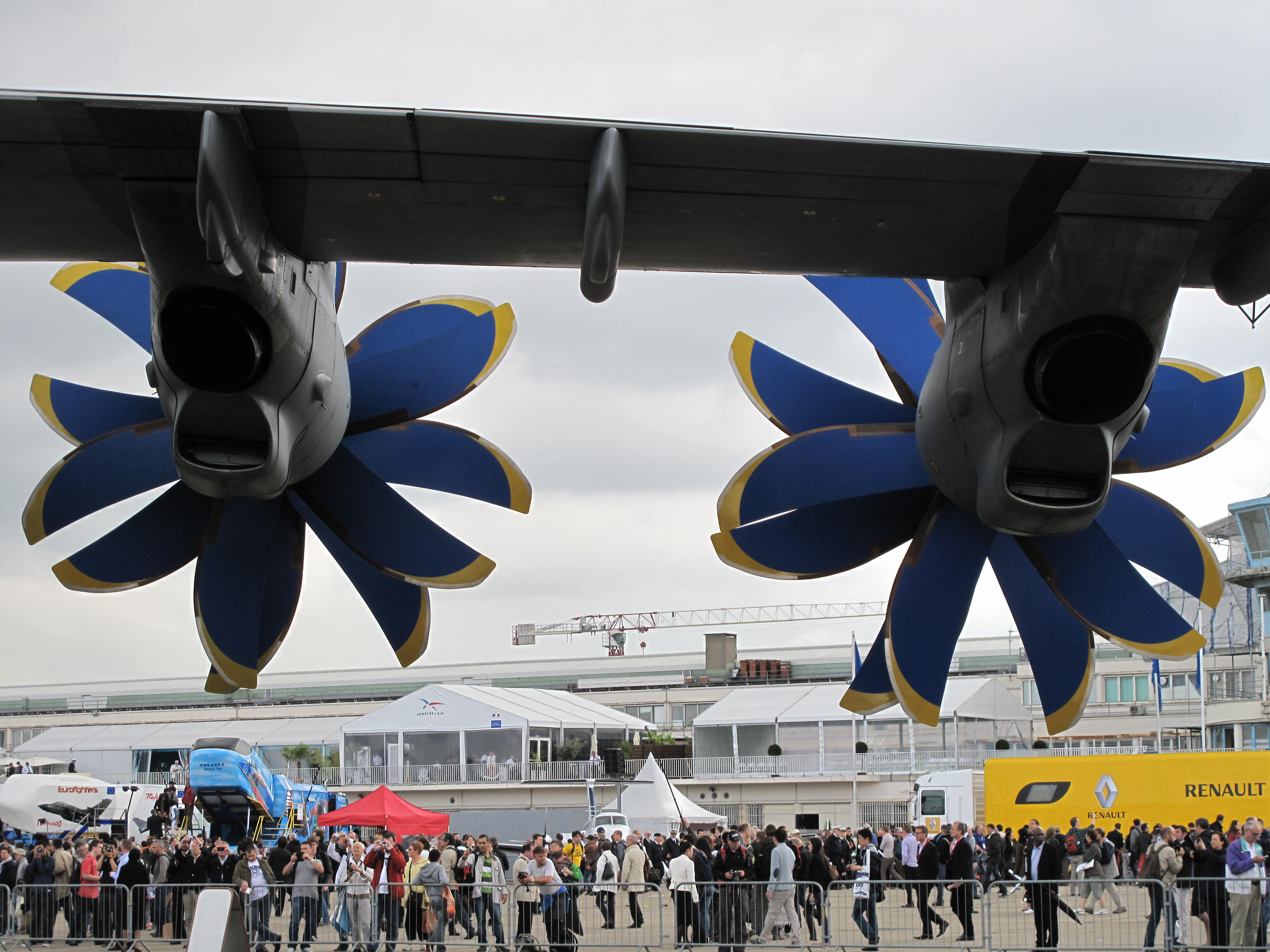
A back view of two Progress D-27 propfans. The aft propellers have only six blades each, while the front propellers each have eight blades.

D-527
an engine with an ultra-high bypass ratio of 18 that was considered for the Tupolev Tu-334. Nicknamed "super contrafan," the D-527 was ducted and had direct-drive contra-rotating fans mounted at the rear of the engine, like Rolls-Royce's proposed RB529 "Contrafan".

D-627
a super-high bypass ratio turbofan engine with a takeoff thrust of up to 11,000 kgf (24,000 lbf; 110 kN). An alternative engine for the Yakovlev Yak-46, the D-627 was designed to have a specific fuel consumption not exceeding 14 g/(kN⋅s) (0.5 lb/(lbf⋅h)) at a cruise altitude of 11,000 m (36,000 ft) and a cruise speed of Mach 0.8 (461 kn; 853 km/h; 530 mph). The D-627 had coaxial contra-rotating fans with a differential gearbox.

D-727
a variant for the commercial version of the An-70, called the An-70T. A high-bypass turbofan engine, the D-727 has a bypass ratio of 12.85. The D-727 was also the powerplant for the Yak-46-1, the high-bypass turbofan version of the Yakovlev Yak-46.

AI-727
a range of ultra-high bypass ratio (of nearly 13), geared turbofan engines with a low-noise, wide-chord fan; and thrust between 10,000 and 11,500 kilograms-force (22,000 and 25,000 pounds-force; 98 and 113 kilonewtons). This engine had a takeoff thrust SFC (TSFC) of 7.3 g/(kN⋅s) (0.257 lb/(lbf⋅h)) and a cruise TSFC of 15.3 g/(kN⋅s) (0.540 lb/(lbf⋅h)). The engine was offered to power the Antonov An-148T and the Irkut MS-21.

== Applications ==
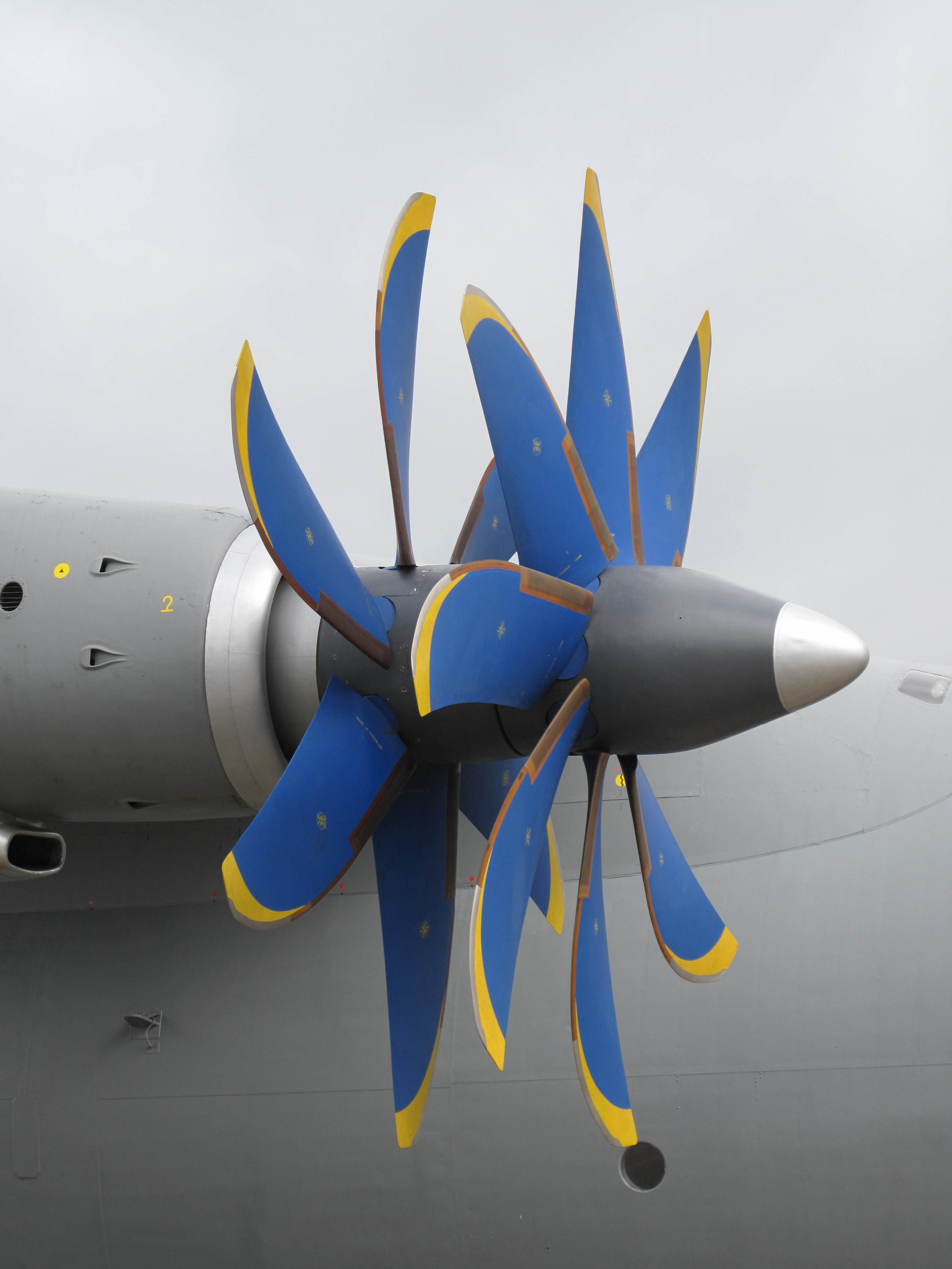
A side view of a D-27 propfan on the Antonov An-70 at the 2013 Paris Air Show.

- Antonov An-70
- Antonov An-180 (abandoned)
- Beriev A-42
- Ilyushin Il-76 (testbed)
- Tupolev Tu-334 (rejected)
- Tupolev Tu-95MS (proposed re-engine)
- Yakovlev Yak-44 (abandoned)
- Yakovlev Yak-46 (abandoned)

== Specifications ==
==== General characteristics ====
- Type: Three-shaft geared tractor-configuration propfan engine
- Length: 4.205 m (13.80 ft; 4,205 mm; 165.6 in)
- Width: 1.259 m (4.131 ft; 1,259 mm; 49.6 in)
- Height: 1.37 m (4.49 ft; 1,370 mm; 54 in)
- Propeller diameter: 4.5 m (14.8 ft; 4,500 mm; 177 in)
- Diameter: 0.97 m (3.2 ft; 970 mm; 38 in)
- Dry weight: 1,650 kilograms (3,638 lb)
- Propeller weight: 1,100 kg (2,400 lb) (without the propeller governor)

==== Components ====
- Compressor: 5-stage axial flow low-pressure compressor (LPC); high-pressure compressor (HPC) with 2 axial stages and 1 centrifugal stage
- Combustors: Annular combustion chamber
- Turbine: 1-stage high-pressure turbine (HPT), 1-stage low-pressure turbine (LPT), 4-stage free power turbine

==== Performance ====
- Maximum thrust: 12,100 kgf (26,800 lbf; 119 kN) at 1,000 rpm
- Overall pressure ratio: 29.25
- Air mass flow: 27.4 kg/s (60 lb/s)
- Turbine inlet temperature: 1,665 K (2,997 °R; 1,392 °C; 2,537 °F)
- Specific fuel consumption: 10.87 g/kN/s (0.384 lb/lbf/h); Cruise: 11 g/(kN⋅s) (0.4 lb/(lbf⋅h))
- Power specific fuel consumption: Takeoff: 0.180 kg/(hp⋅h) (0.241 kg/kWh; 0.40 lb/(hp⋅h)); Cruise: 0.140 kg/(hp⋅h) (0.188 kg/kWh; 0.31 lb/(hp⋅h))
- Power-to-weight ratio: 8.5 shp/kg (6.3 kW/kg; 3.9 shp/lb)

== See also ==
- 1995 Borodianka mid-air collision
- 2001 Antonov An-70 Crash
- Europrop TP400
- Kuznetsov NK-12
- Kuznetsov NK-93

Related development

- Progress D-236

Comparable engines

- General Electric GE36
- Pratt & Whitney/Allison 578-DX
- Rolls-Royce RB3011

Related lists

- List of aircraft engines
