= Boeing 7J7 =

Proposed short to medium range airliner that would have succeeded the 727

General information
- National origin: United States
- Manufacturer: Boeing Commercial Airplanes
- Status: Developed, never built
- Number built: 0

The Boeing 7J7 was an American short- to medium-range airliner proposed by American aircraft manufacturer Boeing in the 1980s. It was envisioned as carrying up to 150 passengers and was touted as the successor to the Boeing 727, which had entered service in 1964. With interest from Scandinavian Airlines as a customer, and the Japan Aircraft Development Corporation as a parts supplier (contributing to the "J" in 7J7), it was initially planned to enter service in 1992. The 7J7 was intended as a highly fuel-efficient aircraft employing new technologies, including conceptual propfan engines – which never proceeded beyond prototype testing – mounted on the rear fuselage. During a development period that dragged on for years, potential customers had time to rethink and make competing demands for size and layout, leading to further delays in Boeing's decision making. The project was eventually postponed and then quietly cancelled.

== Development ==
The 7J7 was the culmination of Boeing's Seven Dash Seven (7–7) 150-seat aircraft idea, which the company had considered since at least 1981. It was to be Boeing's second attempt at a replacement for the Boeing 727, its aging 150-seat aircraft, which had entered service in 1964. The Boeing 757, a larger airplane that Boeing expected existing 727 customers to upgrade to, had unexpectedly slow sales leading to its 1983 entry into commercial service, as airline deregulation resulted in airlines using smaller aircraft at increased frequencies. By vacating the 727's seating capacity, Boeing had a large capacity gap in its aircraft lineup between the larger 757 and smaller Boeing 737.

In 1983, Scandinavian Airlines (SAS), an airline that employed aircraft mostly from McDonnell Douglas, contacted Boeing about the aircraft concept to replace its McDonnell Douglas DC-9s. The airline would become the 7J7's most faithful customer, and it would wield a large influence in the aircraft's cabin design. Japan initially agreed to a letter of understanding with Boeing in March 1984 to take a 25-percent share in a future 150-seat airliner, such as Boeing's Seven Dash Seven or Japan's "YXX" project, that would enter service in 1988 using the IAE V2500 turbofan as the engine, which was developed in part by the Japanese Aero Engine Corporation. However, Boeing became increasingly interested in the latest propfan engine research that would yield large double-digit fuel savings, in particular with the gearless unducted fan (UDF) concept from the aviation division of General Electric. By February 1985, Boeing postponed the service entry of the then-unnamed aircraft to the early 1990s so that propfan technology would be ready for the plane; Boeing made the engine change, schedule change, and announcement unilaterally, which surprised and upset its Japanese partners. It also scrapped the 7–7 code name, saying that the moniker was too commonly seen as a possible direct competitor to the Airbus A320, and that the aircraft Boeing had in mind would be a half-generation ahead. The company held a program kickoff meeting for suppliers on May 13, 1985, and then it debuted a model of the aircraft concept at the 1985 Paris Air Show, where Boeing announced that it would start taking orders in 1987–1988 for deliveries starting in the first half of 1992. In August 1985, the code name for the aircraft was changed to the 7J7. On December 20, 1985, Boeing reached an agreement to test the proposed Pratt & Whitney/Allison 578-DX geared propfan engine for use on the 7J7.

In March 1986, Boeing officially announced Japan's 25 percent participation in the 7J7. The name of the aircraft reflected this participation, as the "J" in 7J7 represented the Japan Aircraft Development Corporation (JADC), a partnership of large Japanese industrial firms Kawasaki Heavy Industries, Fuji Heavy Industries and Mitsubishi Heavy Industries that held a collective 25% interest in the project. Shorts from the United Kingdom and Saab-Scania from Sweden also invested in the program a few weeks later, but with smaller, single-digit percentages. Hawker de Havilland of Australia joined with a similar small percentage in December 1986.

During the same week that Boeing made the Japanese 7J7 announcement, SAS held a 13-member board of directors meeting near Boeing headquarters to inspect Boeing's 7J7 work. The airline also expressed its desire to eliminate middle seats in a six-abreast configuration and asked that the cabin include a seven-abreast option for economy travel. Jan Carlzon, SAS's chairman at the time, dangled the possibility of SAS being a launch customer. He suggested that if the 7J7 were built, SAS could become the largest operator of Boeing aircraft within 10 years. In mid-1986, Ireland-based aircraft leasing firm GPA Group also declared its desire to be a 7J7 launch customer.

On August 20, 1986, the General Electric GE36 UDF engine was tested in flight for the first time, on a Boeing 727 testbed. The next month at the Farnborough Air Show, Boeing stated that the early acoustical results were better than expected. The company declared that the test levels were already at an acceptable state for quietness and noise quality, and that the production engine would reduce the noise levels a further 12–15 decibels. Boeing also announced that the company would probably build the 7J7 in two versions; the widely known 150-seat version would be joined by a smaller-capacity, 100-to-115 seat version, which might have a different fuselage size but still be powered by GE's UDF. The miniature concept was called the 7J7-110. It would be developed by the same 7J7 team for commonality savings, and the 7J7-110 would be launched 6–12 months after the larger 7J7's kickoff. In December 1986, however, an official from European airframe rival Airbus claimed that Boeing was offering airlines a 110-seat propfan plane and a 150-or-more seat airliner with ducted fans. The claim seemed to be verified when Boeing publicly announced its consideration of using wing-mounted engines with the IAE SuperFan in January 1987. At the same time, the company also reversed its consideration of the smaller 7J7 model, choosing to promote a new 737 derivative instead. Boeing recommitted to the aft-mounted UDF in April, albeit one day after IAE announced that it could not complete the engine by its previous May 1992 target date. Against the protests of Allison and Pratt & Whitney (which had joined Allison in its propfan effort), Boeing also rejected the 578-DX engine due to insufficient power, even though it had not yet tested the engine in flight.

Potential customers, who could afford to be choosier in an oversupplied world aircraft market, were concerned about the economics and noise of the unproven propfan engines, though. The frequent major changes in the aircraft's design also discouraged airplane buyers from committing. Boeing neglected to survey the needs of different airlines before visiting them on a road show, so it was surprised by the unenthusiastic overall response to the 7J7 after the airframer had put so many resources into development. However, by May 1987, the 7J7 was on schedule to begin its official marketing campaign on July 1 and to start manufacturing on September 1 of that year. Boeing did attract public interest in the spring from British Airways, which was considering the 7J7 to replace its 35 Boeing 737-200 aircraft. Also, despite its chairman Robert Crandall saying 12 months earlier that fuel prices were too low to order any propfan aircraft by 1991, American Airlines announced in early August 1987 that it was investigating larger, stretched versions of the 7J7 for a possible order of 100 aircraft.

=== Postponement ===
Later that month, Boeing pushed back the scheduled certification of the 7J7 from 1992 to 1993, saying that the market needed time to decide whether it wanted a 140-seat or a 170-seat airplane. In justifying the decision, Boeing mentioned that SAS, British Airways and American Airlines were the most enthusiastic prospective buyers, but the two European carriers chose a smaller plane, while American wanted the larger size. Other reports had only mentioned SAS preferring the smaller size, but favoring the bigger plane was a consensus of either US-based airlines or a core group of about a dozen airlines that had expressed the most desire in the aircraft. Boeing also expressed worry that if the 7J7 were initially designed at the larger size, the GE UDF would be able to accommodate it, but the UDF engine core might not be capable enough to power future stretches of the 7J7.

On December 16, 1987, Boeing delayed the availability date of the 7J7 indefinitely. The number of engineers devoted to the 7J7, which had already been reduced from 1,000 to 900 in October and then to 600 by December, would be reduced again to 300 in the following weeks. Although SAS publicly stated that it was still ready to order 100 7J7 aircraft in April 1988, the lack of a similar-sized domestic order led Boeing to instead concentrate its resources on further developments of the Boeing 737 and the Boeing 757. By May 25, 1988, while announcing an order for 50 Boeing 757s and 50 further options from American Airlines, Boeing said that it had begun a total rethink about the 7J7 project, dropping the 7J7 name in favor of the more generic term "new medium-sized jet transport."

The 7J7 project technically continued for a long time afterward, although it never again came close to an official launch. In December 1990, the Japanese government was still urging Boeing to build the 7J7, saying that they preferred it to the 777. Two months later, Boeing confirmed that it was still meeting with its Japanese partners twice a year to discuss the 7J7, which was now framed as an eventual replacement for the 737. The aircraft had also devolved to fill a 100 to 170-seat category, a much less narrowly defined market target than before, and Boeing was no longer sure whether it should be a single-aisle or twin-aisle aircraft. Boeing chairman Frank Shrontz renewed the joint 7J7 development agreement with the Japanese firms in Hawaii, and planned to modify their memorandum of understanding. By 1994, Boeing still denied reports that Japan had ended funding of the 7J7, stating that Boeing and Japan each had five people working on the project. Although the demise of the 7J7 project disappointed their aviation industry, Japanese companies contributed significantly larger percentages of subsequent Boeing projects (about 15% of the Boeing 767 and 25% of the Boeing 777). Japanese industry is also a primary foreign partner on the Boeing 787.

Rudy Hillinga, who in 1985 tried unsuccessfully to sell the 7J7 to Lufthansa as Boeing's head of sales in Germany, later said that he helped kill the 7J7 with Lufthansa's support. Hillinga claimed that if Boeing had continued with the 7J7 effort, the 737 never would have accumulated 10,000 aircraft sales by the early 2010s. However, Alan Mulally, who was director of engineering for the 7J7 and would become the CEO of Ford Motor Company two decades later, stated that the 7J7 was one of the best research and development investments that Boeing ever made.

=== Competition ===
Competing with the 7J7 for airline interest was McDonnell Douglas's proposed MD-91 and MD-92, two propfan-powered derivatives of the MD-80; the proposed clean-sheet aircraft MD-94X, another McDonnell Douglas aircraft powered by propfans; the Airbus A320; and Boeing's own 737. The A320 featured a lot of similar advanced technology and electronics but was powered by conventional turbofan engines, as Airbus had rejected propfan technology in 1980, before the A320 was conceived. Both McDonnell Douglas and Airbus believed that Boeing never intended to build the 7J7.

== Design ==
(Note: This section reflects what was known about the 7J7 concept in August 1987, right before its wishful entry date was delayed. At that moment, the aircraft was defined to its greatest detail, though still envisioning the use of technology advances that have never been fully achieved, such as propfan engines.)

The aircraft was planned to include advanced technology and electronics, such as:

- Fly-by-wire flight control system by GEC Marconi Avionics
- Glass cockpit by Honeywell utilizing LCDs
- Advanced integrated avionics suite
- Widespread use of high-strength composites such as carbon-fiber
- Two General Electric GE36 UDF rear-mounted advanced technology contra-rotating unducted fan (propfan) engines

The sum of all these features promised better fuel consumption by 60 percent compared to any existing large passenger aircraft technology at the time. 43 percentage points of those savings would be due to the propfan engines, 11 percentage points from aerodynamic refinements, four percentage points from structural changes, and two percentage points from systems improvements. Computer technology would reduce the amount of wires and connectors by half, saving about 1,300 pounds (590 kg) in wire weight from 46 miles (74 kilometres) of wiring removed, and 250 pounds (110 kg) in connector weight.

Boeing planned to save 2,000 to 2,500 pounds (910 to 1,130 kg) in weight through the use of aluminum-lithium (Al–Li) and composites. The airframer hoped to build the 7J7's wings out of aluminum-lithium, despite the material costing about three times more to use than conventional aluminum alloys. Claiming greater knowledge of Al–Li than its competitors, Boeing expected that aluminum-lithium alloys, which were then in their second generation of commercial availability, would save eight percent in weight compared with current aluminum alloys, or about 800 lb (360 kg). The aircraft could also have many parts built out of composites, including most of the structure behind the aft pressure bulkhead. In the primary structure, Boeing planned to use carbon fiber for the vertical fin, horizontal fin, beams, and stanchions. The secondary structure would contain carbon fiber in the rudder, elevator, aileron, flaps, nose gear and main landing gear doors, engine cowling, and wingtips. Combined carbon and glass fiber would be used for the fixed trailing edges of the wings and empennage, the flap track fairings, wing-to-body fairings, and engine strut fairings.

=== Cabin ===
The 7J7 was to have a twin-aisle (2+2+2) seating configuration, giving a wide and spacious cabin for its class, with no passenger more than one seat from an aisle. Alternatively, the aircraft could fit a high-density, seven-abreast (2+3+2) seating configuration with 17-inch wide (43 cm) seats and 18-inch wide (46 cm) aisles. The fuselage diameter of 188 inches (478 cm) is wider than earlier candidates, such as a 164-inch diameter (417 cm), six-abreast design (with a single aisle, although a twin-aisle configuration was considered) and a 180-inch diameter (457 cm), six-abreast twin-aisle design. However, Boeing retained a backup option of a 155-inch diameter (394 cm), single-aisle fuselage design, as the widebody design caused a 6,000 lb (2,700 kg) increase in operating weight compared to a narrowbody design.

The twin-aisle setup would reduce passenger onboarding and deboarding times by ten minutes, allowing airlines to plan for 50-percent faster turnaround times compared to its competitors; Boeing's research found that even two 18-inch skinny aisles (46 cm) turned passengers around faster than one 26-inch wide aisle (66 cm). The cabin contained modular seat elements so that seat pitch (distance between rows), seat width, and armrest width could be adjusted. It also offered an airline the ability to easily change between six-abreast and seven-abreast configurations overnight.

=== Flight capability ===
Boeing also provided a higher gross weight option for the plane by configuring the in-fuselage part of the wing to hold fuel. This option increased the 7J7's range from 2,700 to 4,250 nautical miles (3,110 to 4,890 mi; 5,000 to 7,870 km) for a standard (six-abreast) seating configuration, and from 2,250 to 3,900 nautical miles (2,590 to 4,490 mi; 4,170 to 7,220 km) for a high-density (seven-abreast) seating configuration. Boeing's 7J7 design had the UDF as the baseline engine with a cruise speed of Mach 0.83, according to General Electric, and the aircraft would cruise at an altitude of 41,000 feet (12,000 m).

=== Storage ===
A volume of 1,800 cubic feet (50.9 m^{3}) was available for storage. 937 ft^{3} (26.54 m^{3}) was available in the forward hold, and 555 ft^{3} (15.72 m^{3}) was available in the aft hold. It could be used for bulk storage or to hold standard LD3-46 unit load devices, a smaller size of air cargo container that was entering usage with the debut of the Airbus 320. The amount of available cabin stowage would be 3 ft^{3} (85 L) per passenger, an increase from the per passenger standard of 2 ft^{3} (57 L) at the time.

== Specifications ==
(Note: This section reflects what was known about the 7J7 concept in August 1987, right before its wishful entry date was delayed. At that moment, the aircraft was defined to its greatest detail, though still envisioning the use of technology advances that have never been fully achieved, such as propfan engines.)

General characteristics

- Capacity: 147 in standard 2+2+2 seating; 166 in high-density 2+3+2 seating
- Length: 143 ft 11 in (43.87 m) , cabin length: 26.72 m (87.7 ft)
- Wingspan: 121 ft (37 m)
- Height: 35 ft (11 m)
- Wing area: 1,498 sq ft (139.2 m^{2})
- Aspect ratio: 10.3
- Empty weight: 99,740 lb (45,241 kg)
- Max takeoff weight: 160,400 lb (72,756 kg)
- Powerplant: 2 × General Electric GE36-C25 propfans, 25,000 lbf (110 kN) thrust each
- Propellers: ten (front) + eight (back)-bladed Dowty Rotol

Performance

- Maximum speed: Mach 0.83 cruise
- Range: 2,700–2,250 nmi (3,110–2,590 mi, 5,000–4,170 km) base version, standard 2+2+2 seating or high-density 2+3+2 seating; high gross weight version: 4,250–3,900 nmi (4,890–4,490 mi; 7,870–7,220 km) standard or high-density seating

== See also ==
Related development

- Boeing 727
- Boeing 767
- Boeing 777

Other cancelled aircraft projects of comparable role, configuration, and era

- Antonov An-180
- McDonnell Douglas MD-94X
- Tupolev Tu-334
- Yakovlev Yak-46

== Bibliography ==
- "Asian aspirations: Japan is anxious to expand its interests in civil aviation". Asia. Flight International. Vol. 147, no. 4475. Singapore. June 7–13, 1995. pp. 118–119. ISSN 0015-3710. Archived from the original on October 9, 2019.
- Fisher, Lawrence M. (January 27, 1988). "Boeing updates 2 jets in a shift of strategy". New York Times. p. D1.
- "Flying in 1995—and beyond". Tech Update. Popular Mechanics. Vol. 164, no. 11. Hearst Magazines. November 1987. p. 68. ISSN 0032-4558.
- O'Lone, Richard G. (August 31, 1987). "Boeing delays 7J7 program; mid-1993 certification expected". Air Transport. Aviation Week & Space Technology. Vol. 127, no. 9. pp. 28–30. ISSN 0005-2175.
- "Boeing and MDC size up propfan market" (PDF). Air Transport. Flight International. Vol. 130, no. 4043. Seattle, Washington, USA. December 27, 1986. p. 4. ISSN 0015-3710.
- Donne, Michael (December 15, 1986). "Why Boeing widened its range of prop-fan aircraft / Market forces have changed leading US airframe maker's plans". Financial Times. No. 30110. p. 4. ISSN 0307-1766.
- Donne, Michael (December 15, 1986). "Boeing plans second prop-fan aircraft". Financial Times. No. 30110. p. 38. ISSN 0307-1766.
- Rinearson, Peter (November 23, 1986). "Boeing vs. Airbus - The fate of two airliners raises questions in Japan about the safety of Boeing's 747". Economy. Seattle Times. Tokyo, Japan. p. D1. ISSN 0745-9696. ProQuest 384989806.
- O'Lone, Richard G. (October 6, 1986). "Boeing studies closely spaced launch of 7j7 aircraft programs". Air Transport. Aviation Week & Space Technology. Vol. 125, no. 14. pp. 32–33. ISSN 0005-2175.
- Davies, John (September 24, 1986). "Big wing span future problem". Journal of Commerce.
- Reed, Arthur (May 1986). "SAS feels heat from internal, external pressures". Air Transport World. Vol. 23, no. 5. pp. 30–34. ISSN 0002-2543. OCLC 13695907.
- "Boeing calls it the 7J7" (PDF). World News. Flight International. Vol. 128, no. 3980. Seattle, Washington, USA. October 5, 1985. p. 2. ISSN 0015-3710.
- "Cost will delay UDF says Airbus" (PDF). Paris Report. Flight International. Vol. 127, no. 3963. June 8, 1985. p. 16. ISSN 0015-3710.
- "No headline in original" (Press release). New York, New York, USA: Scandinavian Airlines System (SAS). PR Newswire. January 31, 1985 – via LexisNexis. "SAS was recently the first airline to receive an invitation from the Boeing company to participate in the development of a 150-seat aircraft with propfan engines which would be ready for service by the mid-1990s. The Boeing project is based on SAS's concept of an airliner which better satisfies the passengers' comfort requirements -- the so-called Passenger Pleasing Plane, or 3P."
- "Boeing lines up Japan" (PDF). Air Transport. Flight International. Vol. 125, no. 3907. Seattle, Washington, USA. March 24, 1984. p. 739. ISSN 0015-3710.
