= Tupolev Tu-334 =

Cancelled airliner by Tupolev

Tu-334
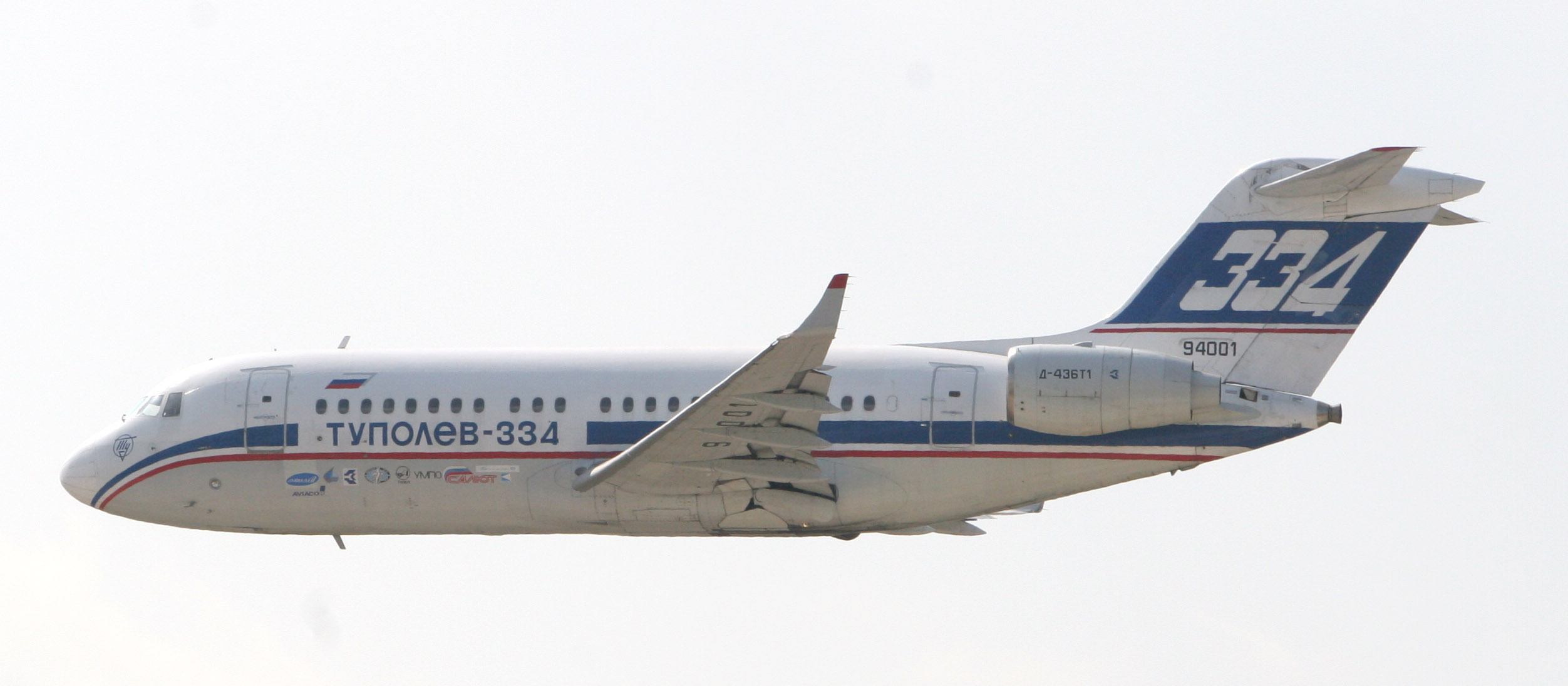
- At the 2007 MAKS Airshow

General information
- Type: Narrow-body jet airliner
- National origin: Russia
- Manufacturer: United Aircraft Corporation
- Status: Cancelled
- Number built: 2

History
- Manufactured: 1999–2009
- First flight: 8 February 1999
- Developed from: Tupolev Tu-204

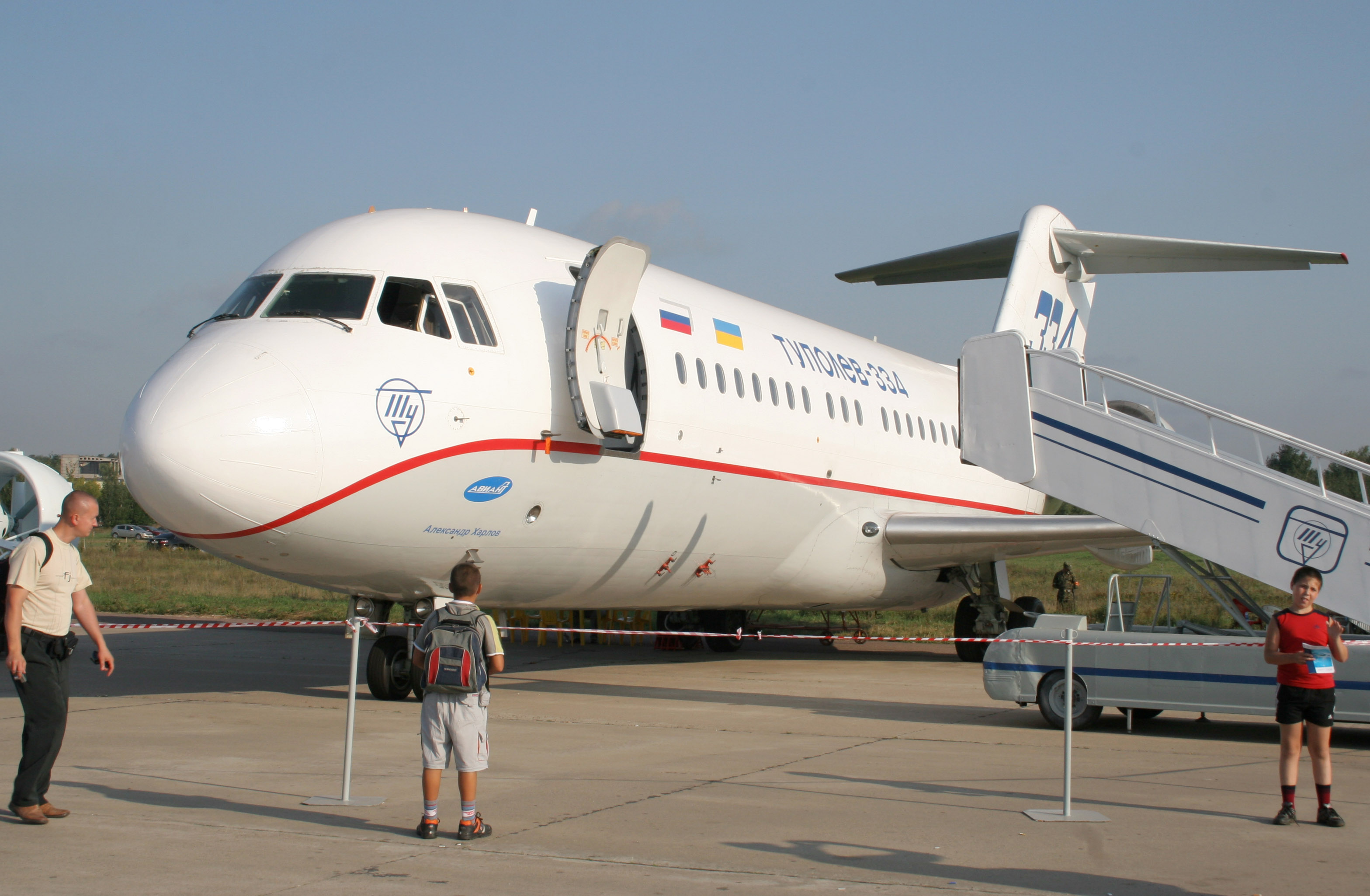
A Tu-334 at the 2007 MAKS Airshow, Moscow

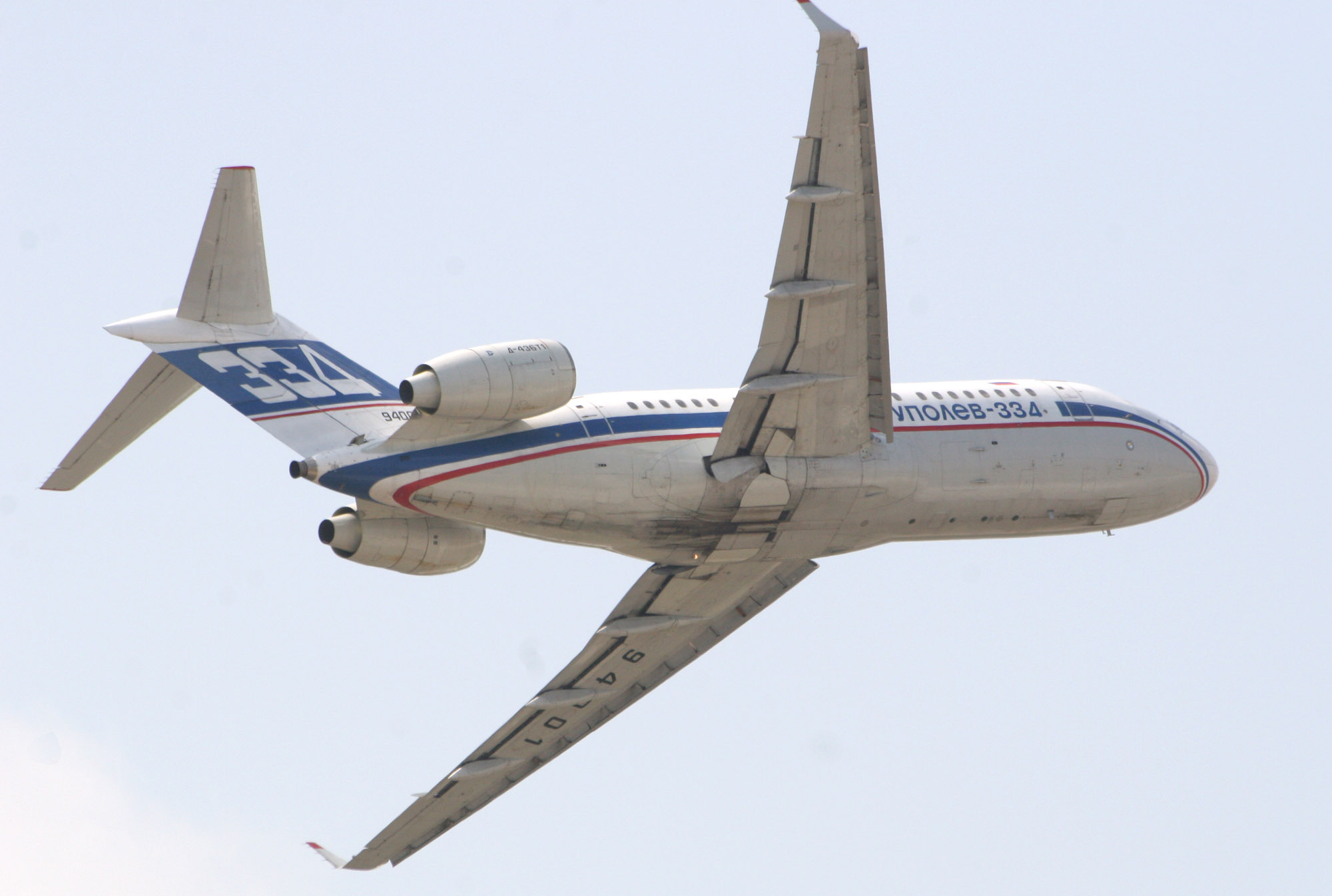
A Tu-334 performing at MAKS 2007

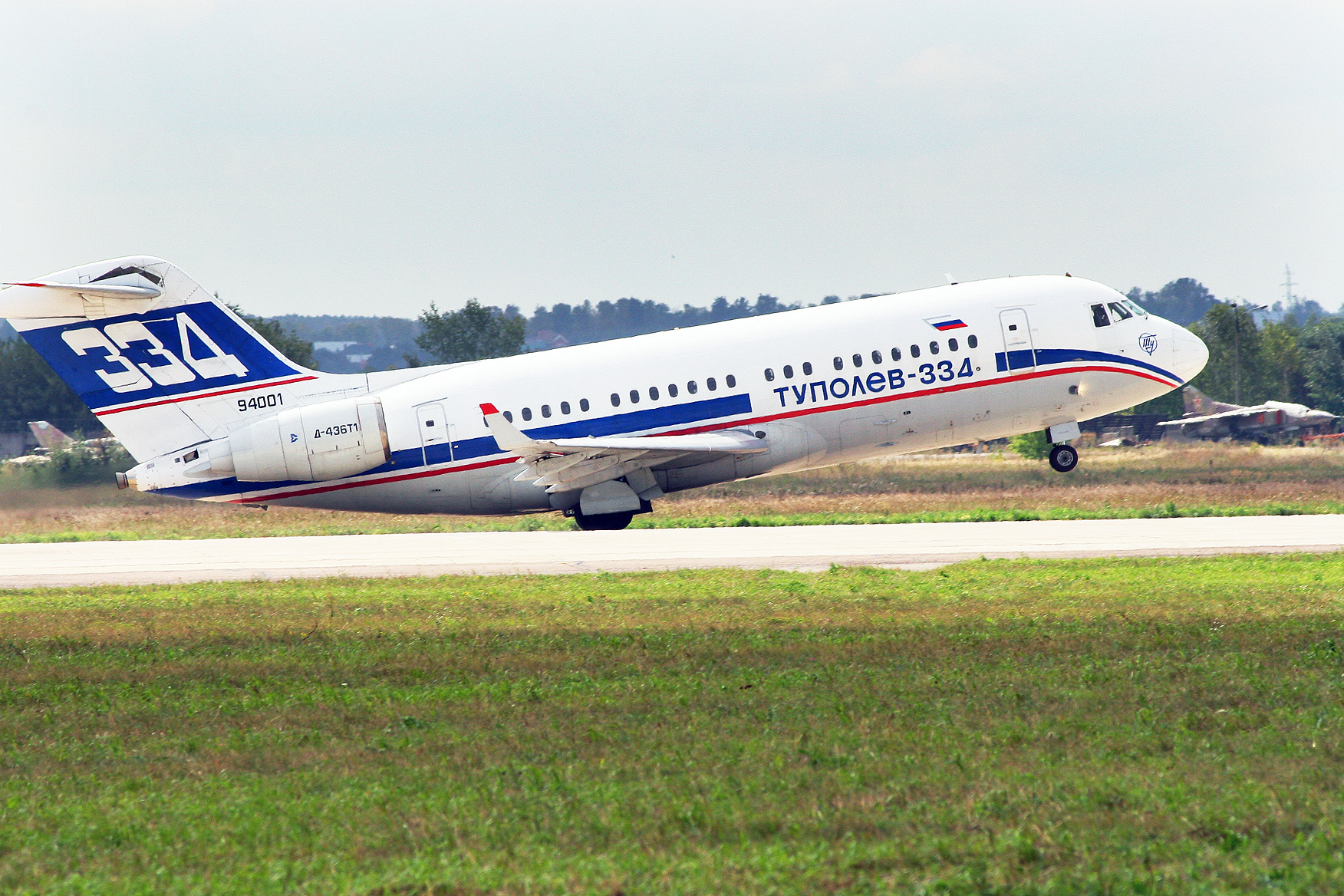
A Tu-334 at the 2007 MAKS Airshow, Moscow

The Tupolev Tu-334 (Russian: Туполев Ту-334) was a Russian short-to-medium range airliner project that was developed to replace the aging Tupolev Tu-134 and Yak-42s in service around the world. The airframe was based on a shortened Tu-204 fuselage and a scaled-down version of that aircraft's wing. Unlike the Tu-204, however, the Tu-334 has a T-tail and engines mounted on the sides of the rear fuselage instead of under the wings. With the nationalisation of the Russian aircraft companies in 2009 to form United Aircraft Corporation, it was decided not to continue with the programme.

== Development ==
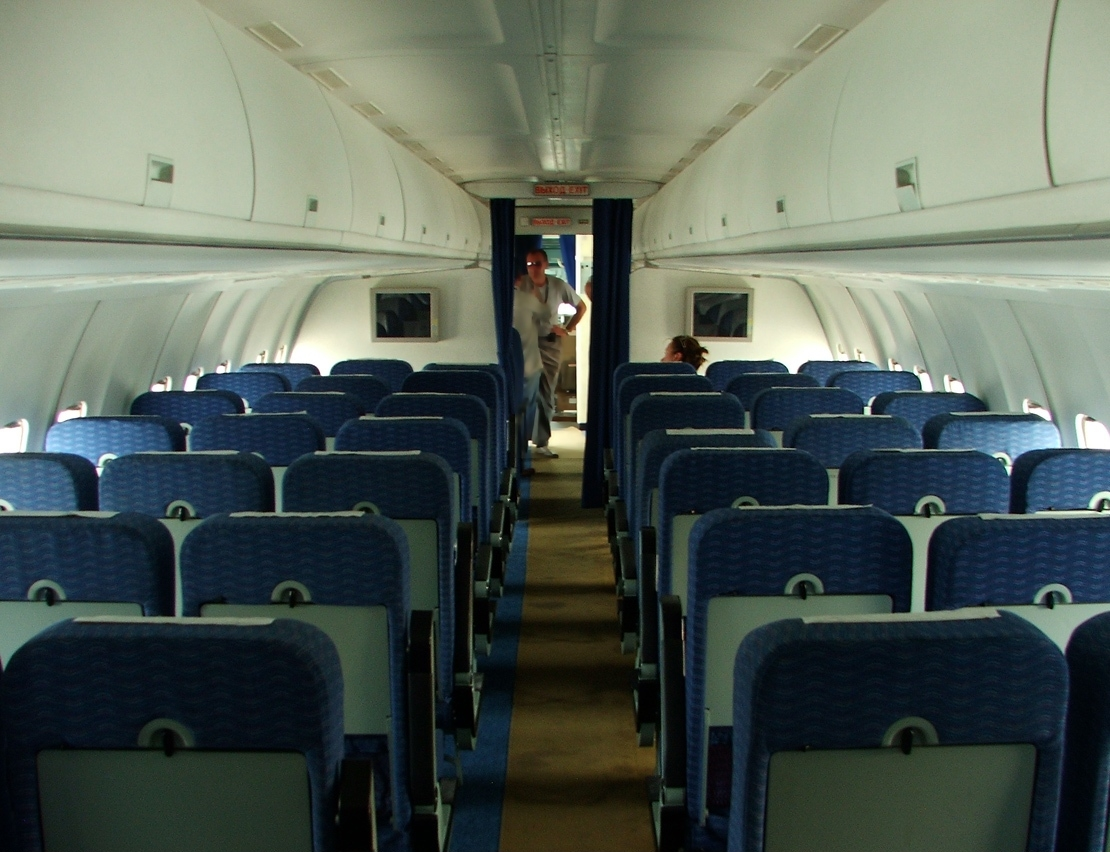
Tu-334 cabin.

The Tupolev Design Bureau introduced the Tu-334 in early 1989 as an eventual propfan-powered airliner to potentially enter service for Aeroflot in 1995. However, it would have an interim turbofan-powered version that would begin airline service around 1991–1992. Consuming about 20 percent less fuel than the best Soviet turbofan, the propfan engine would be a then-unnamed geared powerplant from the Lotarev engine design bureau. The engine would have a thrust specific fuel consumption (TSFC) of 13 g/(kN⋅s) (0.46 lb/(lbf⋅h)), resulting in a per-passenger aircraft fuel consumption rate of 13 grams per kilometre (0.74 ounces per mile). The turbofan-powered version of the Tu-334 would use Lotarev D-436T engines with a TSFC of 18 g/(kN⋅s) (0.62 lb/(lbf⋅h)) and a bypass ratio of 6.5, and it would consume 20 g/km (1.1 oz/mi) per passenger. The propfan Tu-334 would seat 104-137 passengers, compared with 86-102 passengers for the shorter, turbofan Tu-334.

Tupolev confirmed the use of the D-436 for the turbofan version shortly afterward. However, they initiated discussions with International Aero Engines (IAE) at the 1989 Paris Air Show to discuss using a 7,500-kilogram-force static thrust (17,000-pound-force; 74-kilonewton) derated version of IAE's V2500 11,345 kgf (25,010 lbf; 111.26 kN) engine. The talks, which continued through at least the end of the year, were attributed to worries that the Lotarev could not meet Tupolev's timeline or fuel burn targets, or that Tupolev was canceling the propfan version. There was also concern that Tupolev could not meet Soviet state carrier Aeroflot's urgent capacity needs quick enough. In this scenario, the Soviet aircraft production ministry could allow the Yakovlev Design Bureau to compete and build the Yak-42M (a Yak-42 airliner derivative) because of its quicker availability, despite the ministry's assumed preference for the Tu-334.

Information about the propfan engine began to be revealed during the second quarter of 1990, although the details were often conflicting. In April 1990, while announcing the interim aircraft's service entry date of 1993, Tupolev's chief designer said that the ultrahigh bypass engine to be used would be a Lotarev (now renamed to the Progress design bureau) propfan resembling the General Electric GE36 UDF, and not the propfan it had been working on. However, the Central Institute of Aviation Motors (CIAM), a Soviet engine research institute, reported that Tupolev expected to have a propfan Tu-334 operating by the 1995-1997 period, probably using a geared propfan instead of gearless. Then a subsequent report named the Tu-334 propfan engine as the Lotarev D-27, a 3.8-metre diameter (12.5-foot; 3,800-millimetre; 150-inch), 11,200 kgf thrust (24,700 lbf; 110 kN) powerplant with a TSFC of 12 g/(kN⋅s) (0.44 lb/(lbf⋅h)). The D-27 would also power the newly announced Yakovlev Yak-46 propfan airliner, which was similar to the Yak-42M competitor but used two propfans instead of three turbofans in the aft fuselage. Three weeks later, Tupolev said that government officials would decide shortly between two D-27 offshoot engines from the Progress design bureau for the final Tu-334 version in 1996: a Progress D-227 propfan, or a Progress D-527 "super contrafan," an ungeared but ducted contra-rotating powerplant with a bypass ratio of 18. Days earlier, the Soviet Union premiered a running propfan engine before Western audiences for the first time, flying an Ilyushin Il-76LL testbed aircraft with one installed Progress D-236 engine to the ILA Air Show in Hannover, Germany. Although the Soviets declined in Hannover to name the aircraft that would use the D-236, an October 1990 article named that geared engine as the powerplant for the final Tu-334 variant, which would compete against the D-27-powered Yak-46 for Aeroflot's Tupolev Tu-134 replacement order.

Work commenced on the Tu-334 in the early 1990s, but proceeded slowly due to funding problems arising from the breakup of the Soviet Union. A prototype was displayed in 1995, but this was little more than a mockup with few systems installed. A functional aircraft first flew on 8 February 1999, and later that year, agreements were put in place for MiG to undertake part of the production of the airliner. A Russian type certificate was obtained – after some delay – on 30 December 2003.

Development remained slow due to protracted budget problems. In turn, the certification of the aircraft and its planned entry into serial production was delayed multiple times. As of December 2006 there were firm orders for the Tupolev Tu-334 from seven airlines, including Atlant-Soyuz Airlines and there were letters of intent from 24 airlines to obtain another 297 airplanes. The price per unit for the business version is estimated to be around $43–44 million.

One of the projected customers for the type was Iran. The Iran Aviation Industries Organization (IAIO) was in negotiations to purchase licenses to assemble the aircraft in Iran by 2011 and manufacture them completely by 2015 alongside the Tu-214. Nothing concrete became of these negotiations before the cancellation of the Tu-334 programme.

As late as 2008, Tupolev reported that a total of about 100 airlines had expressed an interest in placing orders for Tu-334s; on 31 July 2008, Tupolev Managing Director Sergei Ilyushenkov announced that production was targeted to begin no later than January 2009. However, this date also passed without any reported progress on Tu-334 serial production.

In 2009, with the project years behind the projected schedule and only two examples built and flying ten years after the first flight, the Tu-334 came under review during the rationalisation of the Russian aircraft companies, which led to the formation of United Aircraft Corporation. In mid-2009, the decision was taken to not continue with the Tu-334 programme and instead focus efforts on the Sukhoi Superjet 100, the Antonov An-148, and the Irkut MC-21.

== Variants ==
Tu-334-100
Basic version, with accommodation for 72 passengers in mixed-class configuration (12 first-class and 60 tourist-class) or 102 passengers in high-density layout. Two 73.6 kN (16,500 lbf) Progress D-436T1 turbofans.
Tu-334-100C
Proposed combi (passenger/freight) version of Tu-334-100.
Tu-334-100D
Planned stretched, extended-range version. Fuselage stretched by 54 cm (21 in) and longer span (32.61 m (107 ft 0 in)) wing. Powered by two 80.4 kN (18,100 lbf) Progress D-436T2 engines.
Tu-334-120
Planned derivative of Tu-334-100, powered by two 88.9 kN (20,000 lb_{f}) Rolls-Royce BR715-55 engines.
Tu-334-120D
Based on the Tu-334-100D, but with two Rolls-Royce BR-715-55 engines.
Tu-334C
Production cargo variant.
Tu-336
Proposed liquid natural gas-fueled version, with cryogenic fuel tanks above the passenger cabin.
Tu-354
Further stretched version, originally designated Tu-334-200. Stretched by 390 cm (150 in) over Tu-334-100, with accommodation for up to 126 passengers. Powered by two Progress D-436T2 or Rolls-Royce BR-715-55 engines, the Tu-354's landing gear was strengthened to use four-wheel bogies.

== Specifications (Tu-334-100) ==
Data from Jane's All The World's Aircraft 2003–2004

General characteristics

- Crew: two–three
- Capacity: 102 passengers (tourist-class, 81 cm (32 in) seat pitch)
- Length: 31.26 m (102 ft 7 in)
- Wingspan: 29.77 m (97 ft 8 in)
- Height: 9.38 m (30 ft 9 in)
- Wing area: 83.23 m^{2} (895.9 sq ft)
- Empty weight: 28,950 kg (63,824 lb)
- Max takeoff weight: 47,900 kg (105,601 lb)
- Powerplant: 2 × Progress D-436T1 turbofan, 73.6 kN (16,500 lbf) thrust each

Performance

- Cruise speed: 820 km/h (510 mph, 440 kn) at 10,600–11,100 m (34,800–36,400 ft)
- Range: 3,150 km (1,960 mi, 1,700 nmi)

== See also ==
Related development

- Tupolev Tu-204

Aircraft of comparable role, configuration, and era

- Airbus A318
- Boeing 717
- Bombardier CRJ1000
- Embraer E195
- Sukhoi Superjet 100

Related lists

- List of jet airliners
- List of airliners

== Sources ==
- Gordon, Yefim; Rigmant, Vladimir (2005). OKB Tupolev: A history of the design bureau and its aircraft. Hinckley, England, UK: Midland Publishing. pp. 284–290. ISBN 978-1-85780-214-6.
- Jackson, Paul, ed. (2003). Jane's all the world's aircraft 2003–2004. Coulsdon, UK: Jane's Information Group. ISBN 978-0-7106-2537-3.
- Duffy, Paul (May 1999). "Tu-334 makes first flight". In Detail. Air Transport World. Vol. 36, no. 5. p. 24. ISSN 0002-2543.
- Nikitin, Yevgeniy (July 1995). Tu-334 passenger liner profiled. Russia national affairs: Economic issues. Central Eurasia (Report). Daily Report: Supplement. Vol. FBIS-SOV-95-145-S. Translated by Foreign Broadcast Information Service (FBIS) (published 28 July 1995). pp. 42–48. hdl:2027/nnc1.cu00734080.
- Aerospatiale, Russia sign cooperation treaty. Science & Technology: Europe/International: Economic competitiveness (Report). JPRS Report. Vol. JPRS-EST-93-017. Translated by Foreign Broadcast Information Service (FBIS). Paris, France (published 12 May 1993). 18 March 1993. pp. 39–40. hdl:2027/nyp.33433016823811.
- "Tupolev tempted by BR715 engine" (PDF). Headlines. Flight International. Vol. 141, no. 4323. 17–23 June 1992. p. 6. ISSN 0015-3710.
- "Rolls-Royce Tu-204 to fly in June" (PDF). Air Transport. Flight International. Vol. 141, no. 4314. 15–21 April 1992. p. 10. ISSN 0015-3710.
- Laxman, Srinivas (25 January 1991). Developments in aircraft, tie-up with Soviets. South Asia: India. Near East & South Asia (Report). JPRS Report. Vol. JPRS-NEA-91-019. Bombay, India (published 19 March 1991). p. 48 – via Foreign Broadcast Information Service (FBIS).
  - JPRS Report Near East & South Asia (Report). Joint Publications Research Service. 19 March 1991. Archived from the original on 9 November 2019 – via Defence Technical Information Center.
- "Aeroflot update to include Tu-334s". Technical: Air Transport. Flight International. Vol. 137, no. 4215. 9–15 May 1990. pp. 26–27. ISSN 0015-3710.
- "Tupolev bureau develops ultrahigh bypass, turbofan engine concepts for Tu-334 transport". Soviet Aerospace Industry. Aviation Week & Space Technology. Vol. 130, no. 23. Moscow, USSR. 5 June 1989. p. 96. ISSN 0005-2175.
