= Yakovlev Yak-46 =

Cancelled Soviet aircraft type

Yak-46

General information
- Type: Airliner
- National origin: Soviet Union / Russia
- Designer: Yakovlev Design Bureau
- Status: Cancelled
- Number built: 0

History
- Developed from: Yakovlev Yak-42

The Yakovlev Yak-46 was a proposed aircraft design based on the Yak-42 with two contra-rotating propellers on the propfan located at the rear. The specification of the Samara turbofans was in the 11,000 kg (24,250 lb) thrust range. Though proposed in the 1990s, production of the Yak-46 never commenced.

== Design and development ==
At the 1987 Paris Air Show, the Soviet Union displayed scale models of several aircraft in development, including a 150-seat aircraft powered by two pusher propfans mounted on the rear fuselage. This aircraft was unnamed at the time, but the Soviets disclosed that the Yakovlev Design Bureau was developing the aircraft. Later in 1987, the Soviet civil aviation minister noted that Yakovlev was building a twin-propfan airliner based on its Yak-42 model. In 1989, Yakovlev planned to test the D-236 propfan engine from the Ivchenko-Progress engine design bureau (also known as Progress, Lotarev, Muravchenko, ZMKB, and Zaporozhye) in flight on a Yak-42 testbed aircraft by the end of the year.

Yakovlev revealed details in early 1990 about Yakovlev's propfan design, which was given the name of Yak-46 and planned to enter service in 1997. The Yak-46 and the Yak-42M, a 4-metre stretched derivative (13-foot; 4,000-millimetre; 160-inch) of the Yak-42 that would enter service in 1994, would have fly-by-wire (FBW) controls, an electronic flight instrument system (EFIS), a supercritical airfoil wing of added aspect ratio, span, and sweep, seating capacity of 150 passengers or more, and new engines with thrust reversal capability. However, the Yak-46 would have two unshrouded propfan engines mounted on the aft fuselage, instead of the Yak-42 and Yak-42M's three aft-mounted turbofan engines (that includes one attached to the vertical stabilizer). Yakovlev also proposed an unnamed interim derivative situated between the Yak-42M and the Yak-46, which would be powered by two underwing engines based on the contra-rotating, integrated, shrouded propfan (CRISP) engine concept. Since this derivative required greater airframe changes, Yakovlev was less sure of its eventual production.

The Yak-46 would hold 150-162 seats in a six-abreast, single-aisle configuration, fly as far as 1,540 nautical miles (2,850 km; 1,770 mi), cruise at a speed of 445 to 460 knots (800 to 850 km/h), and be powered by two Lotarev D-27 propfan engines. The 3.8-metre diameter (12 ft; 3,800 mm; 150 in) propfan engines would have contra-rotating propellers with eight blades in front and six blades in back, have a thrust specific fuel consumption of 0.44 lb/(lbf⋅h) (12 g/(kN⋅s)), and deliver 9,700 kilowatts (13,000 hp), resulting in a thrust of 11,200 kgf (24,700 lbf; 110 kN). The fuel consumption per available seat kilometer of the Yak-46 was 13.8 grams per kilometre (0.78 ounces per mile) per seat. This value compared to 14.5 g/km (0.82 oz/mi) for the Yak-46's underwing engine alternative and 21 g/km (1.2 oz/mi) for the Yak-42M, which was already 35-40% more efficient than the Yak-42. At the time, airline interest but no orders were reported for the Yak-46, but Yakovlev was negotiating to sell 200 Yak-42M planes to Aeroflot, which was then the world's largest airline.

By October 1990, the two versions of the Yak-46 were in competition with the 102-126 seat Tupolev Tu-334, which like the higher-capacity Yak-46 had an interim turbofan version and a final propfan version, to replace hundreds of aging Tupolev Tu-134 airliners at Aeroflot. To prepare for Yak-46 development, Yakovlev created a joint venture with Ivchenko Progress and the Soviet Ministry of Civil Aviation. Aeroflot would help fund a prototype, which would be built starting early in 1991 if the Yak-46 were selected. Annual production would eventually be as high as 100 airliners and would run through 2005.

On March 15, 1991, Yakovlev finally began flight tests of one D-236 propfan engine on a Yak-42E-LL aircraft testbed, making it the first propfan flight test program led by an individual Soviet aircraft design bureau. The testbed appeared on static display at the 1991 Paris Air Show in June. Like the D-27 engine, the D-236 was a contra-rotating system with an eight-bladed front propeller and a six-bladed back propeller. It had a fan diameter of 4.2 m (14 ft; 4,200 mm; 170 in), a power rating of 8,195 kW (10,990 hp), and a thrust rating of 10,500–11,000 kgf (23,000–24,000 lbf; 103–108 kN). The testbed engine was limited to a smaller thrust, though, because the D-236 was more powerful than the Lotarev D-36 engine that it replaced.

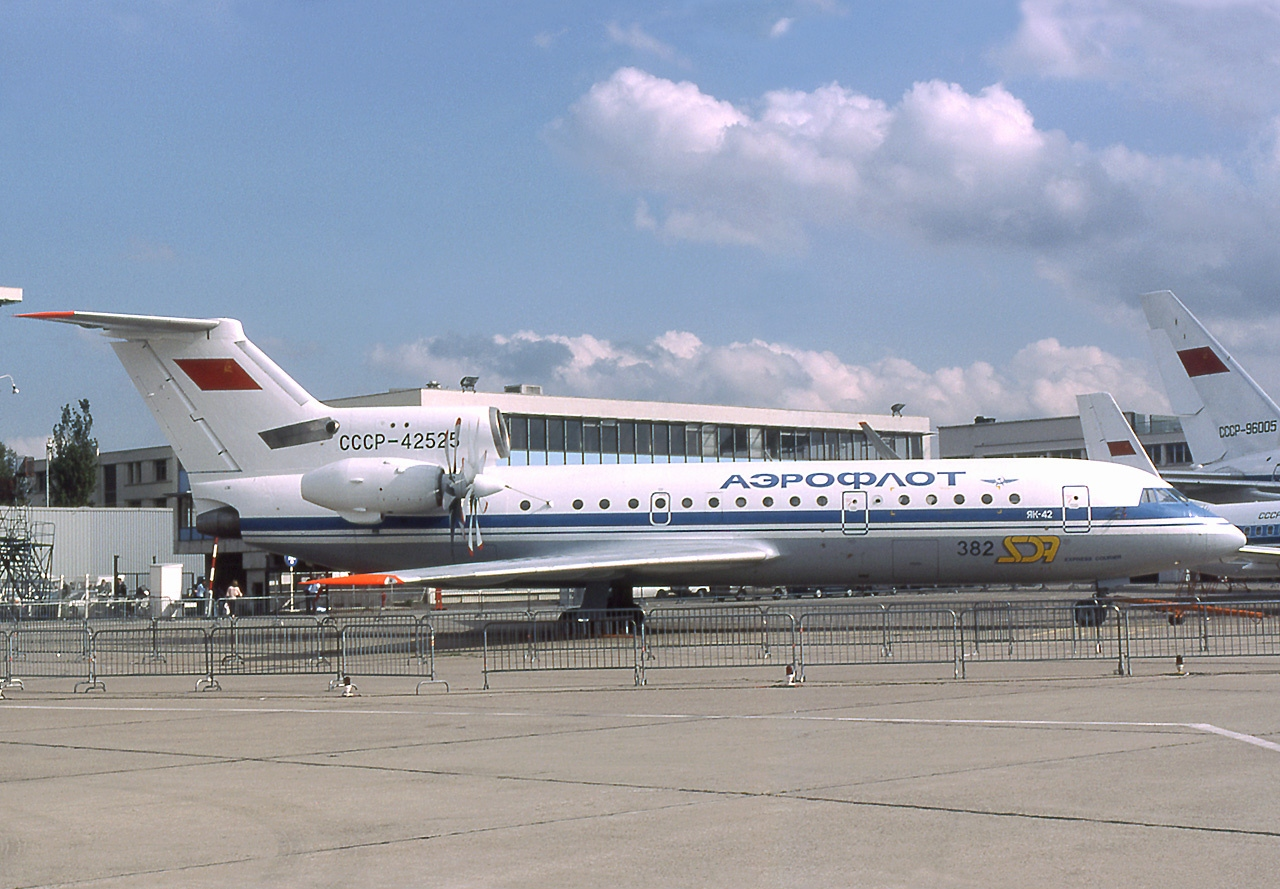
To support the development of its Yak-46 concept, Yakovlev flew a Yak-42E-LL testbed aircraft powered in part by a Progress D-236 experimental propfan engine.

Meanwhile, conflicting reports appeared about the Yak-46 power plant: one article stated that the D-236 would be the eventual engine, but another article said Yakovlev was deciding between a gearless unducted fan, which would yield a fuel consumption of 12 g/km (0.68 oz/mi), and a less-efficient, but now considered more realistic, ducted fan with an ultra-high bypass ratio between 20 and 27. In August, a report stated that the initial version of the Yak-46, now named the Yak-46-1, would have two Progress underwing power plants resembling the International Aero Engines (IAE) SuperFan engine, while the follow-up version, called the Yak-46-2, would again be aft fuselage-mounted D-27 engines. A Soviet aviation publication named the initial engine as the Progress D-627, a quiet, super-high bypass ratio turbofan. Derived from the D-27, the D-627 had ducted, contra-rotating fans and used a differential gearbox. The D-627 had a takeoff thrust of 11,000 kgf (24,000 lbf; 110 kN); its thrust specific fuel consumption (TSFC) at cruise would not exceed 0.5 lb/(lbf⋅h) (14 g/(kN⋅s)) at Mach 0.8 and 11,000 m (36,000 ft) altitude, equivalent to a speed of 461 kn (854 km/h; 531 mph); and the Yak-46's per-passenger fuel consumption with the D-627 would be 15.5 g/km (0.88 oz/mi). The subsequent version of the Yak-46 would have the same characteristics and performance outlined for the D-27 earlier, but its cruise TSFC after losses would be 0.47 lb/(lbf⋅h) (13 g/(kN⋅s)) at 460 kn (850 km/h; 530 mph) speed. In addition, the Yak-46 would have a planned service life of 60,000 hours, based on an annual average flying time of 3,000 hours. Yakovlev was constructing a wooden mockup of the Yak-46 as of November 1991. By August 1992, it was planning for co-production of the aircraft in South Africa.

As of March 1993, Yakovlev had received one order to develop the Yak-46, which temporarily saved the firm from bankruptcy. In mid-1994, the Progress engine design bureau was looking to create a turbojet derivative of its D-27 to use on the Yak-46. Later that year, it was reported that the Yak-46 would use two Progress D-727 high-bypass turbofan engines, without mention of a propfan aircraft version. In 1996, though, another airliner census still described a Yak-46-1 version with D-727 underwing engines followed by a Yak-46-2 with D-27 aft-mounted engines in a T-tail empennage configuration. Because of engine development issues, neither of the planes would fly before the year 2000.

== Specifications ==
Data from Grazhdanskaya Aviatsiya (Civil Aviation), September 1991.

General characteristics

- Crew: 2–3
- Capacity: 150
- Length: 41 m (134 ft 6 in)
- Wingspan: 35.5 m (116 ft 6 in)
- Diameter: 3.8 m (12 ft 6 in) fuselage
- Height: 11 m (36 ft 1 in)
- Wing area: 120 m^{2} (1,300 sq ft)
- Aspect ratio: 10.5
- Empty weight: 37,300 kg (82,232 lb)
- Max takeoff weight: 61,300 kg (135,143 lb)
- Powerplant: 2 × Ivchenko Progress D-27 propfan, 110 kN (25,000 lbf) thrust each at takeoff
- Propellers: 8 fore, 6 aft-bladed coaxial pusher contra-rotating propellers, 3.8 m (12 ft 6 in) diameter

Performance

- Cruise speed: 800 km/h (500 mph, 430 kn)
- Range: 3,500 km (2,200 mi, 1,900 nmi) with normal payload
- Service ceiling: 11,100 m (36,400 ft) cruise
- Lift-to-drag: 18

== See also ==
- Antonov An-180
- Boeing 7J7
- McDonnell Douglas MD-94X
- MPC 75
- Tupolev Tu-334
