= Antonov An-180 =

Ukrainian design for a twin-aisle medium-range propfan airliner

- A design drawing of the proposed airliner

General information
- Type: Wide-body propfan airliner
- National origin: Soviet Union / Ukraine
- Designer: Antonov Design Bureau
- Built by: Production Corporation Polyot; Kharkiv Aviation Plant
- Status: Canceled
- Number built: 0

The Antonov An-180 was a Ukrainian design for a twin-aisle medium-range propfan airliner. Although the design was completed by the Antonov Design Bureau in 1994, the type was not built.

== Development ==
The An-180 was designed as a replacement for the aging Tupolev Tu-134 and Yakovlev Yak-42 airliners. Antonov was discussing this aircraft in Soviet aviation publications as early as October 1990, describing the An-180 as a 164-180 passenger plane with a range of 1,300 to 1,600 nautical miles (2,500 to 3,000 kilometres; 1,600 to 1,900 miles) and a per-passenger fuel consumption of 14 to 15 grams per kilometre (0.79 to 0.85 ounces per mile). The proposed aircraft was introduced to the world at the 1991 Paris Air Show. As of September 1991, the An-180 had a T-tail design with the propfan engines attached to the aft fuselage, but Antonov later modified the design so that the engines were attached to the ends of the horizontal stabilizer in a conventional tail configuration. In 1992, Ukraine and China were studying whether to jointly develop the aircraft.

In April 1994, a prototype of the aircraft was tested at the Russian Central Aviation Institute's transonic wind tunnel, with follow-up tests in July to finalize the design, but financial problems delayed the completion of the study as of November 1994. By February 1995, joint manufacturing was expected to begin at the aircraft factories in Kharkiv, Ukraine and the Production Corporation Polyot plant in Omsk, Russia. Because of extreme funding shortfalls from the Ukraine government, however, the development of the An-180 was fully suspended by August 1995. In 1999, D-27 engines created by the Progress Design Bureau were still expected to be built for the An-180, according to the CEO of Motor Sich, the Ukrainian manufacturer of the D-27. Subsequent attempts to obtain commercial investment failed, though, and by 2004, the An-180 was no longer an Antonov project.

As of 2003, the fuselage of an uncompleted An-180 aircraft remained in storage in a building used for assembly of Antonov's experimental models.

== Design ==
The An-180 was a conventionally designed low-wing cantilever monoplane with a conventional tail unit. The unusual feature was the mounting of an Ivchenko Progress D-27 propfan mounted at the end of each tailplane. Each propfan was to have a coaxial contra-rotating tractor propeller, and the An-180 was also designed with a retractable landing gear with twin nosewheels, and tandem pairs of mainwheels.

It was planned to have a number of variants with seating starting at 150–156 passengers, to a larger variant for 200 passengers, and it was also planned to build a combination passenger/freight and an all-freight variant. The cabin is configured to use two aisles, with a seating row containing two seats each between an aisle and the adjacent windows/cabin walls, and two seats between the two aisles. The undercarriage can store seven LD3-46 unit load devices.

== Specifications ==
Data from Brassey's World Aircraft & Systems Directory

General characteristics

- Crew: two or three
- Capacity: 163
- Length: 40.9 m (134 ft 2 in)
- Wingspan: 35.83 m (117 ft 7 in)
- Diameter: 4.3 m (14 ft 1 in) (fuselage)
- Height: 11.148 m (36 ft 7 in)
- Empty weight: 42,500 kg (93,696 lb)
- Max takeoff weight: 71,700 kg (158,071 lb) normal takeoff weight 67,500 kg (148,812 lb)
- Powerplant: 2 × Ivchenko Progress D-27 propfan, 10,305 kW (13,819 hp) each at take off
- Propellers: 8 fore, 6 aft-bladed Aerosila SV-27 axial contra-rotating tractor

Performance

- Cruise speed: 800 km/h (500 mph, 430 kn)
- Range: 3,300 km (2,100 mi, 1,800 nmi) maximum takeoff weight; 1,800 km (1,100 mi; 970 nmi) normal takeoff weight
- Service ceiling: 10,100 m (33,100 ft) cruise

== See also ==
- Antonov An-70
- Boeing 7J7
- MPC 75
- McDonnell Douglas MD-94X
- Tupolev Tu-334
- Yakovlev Yak-46
