= Experimental aircraft =

Aircraft designed to test or develop new aerospace concept or technology

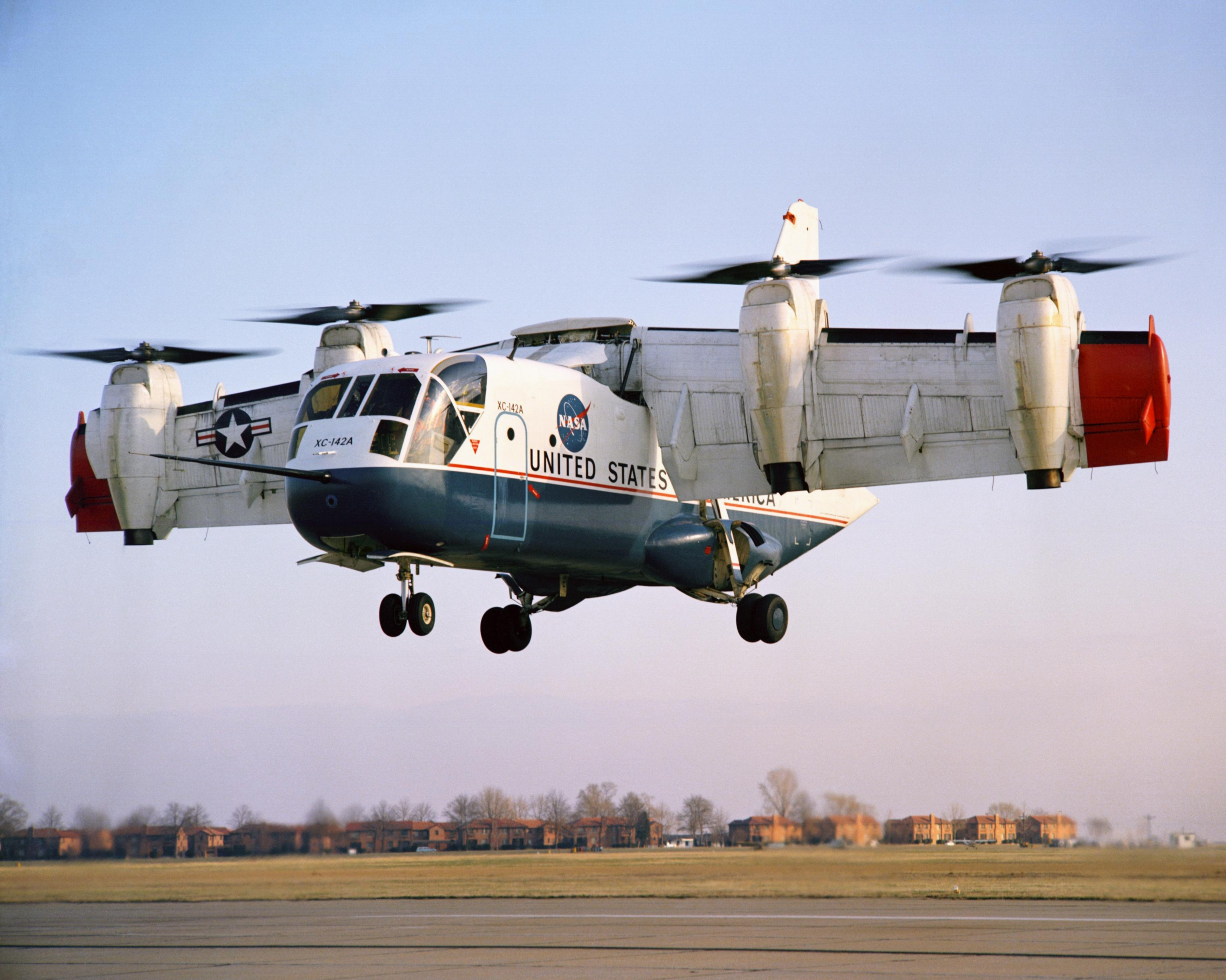
A LTV XC-142 experimental V/STOL aircraft.

An experimental aircraft is an aircraft intended for testing new aerospace technologies and design concepts.

The term research aircraft or testbed aircraft, by contrast, generally denotes aircraft modified to perform scientific studies, such as weather research or geophysical surveying, similar to a research vessel.

The term "experimental aircraft" also has specific legal meaning in Australia, the United States and some other countries; usually used to refer to aircraft flown with an experimental certificate. In the United States, this also includes most homebuilt aircraft, many of which are based on conventional designs and hence are experimental only in name because of certain restrictions in operation.

== See also ==
- Index of aviation articles
- Experimental Aircraft Association
- Experimental Aircraft Programme
- List of experimental aircraft
- List of X-planes
- Testbed aircraft
- Technology demonstration
