= Rolls-Royce RB529 Contrafan =

High-thrust aircraft engine proposed by Rolls-Royce in the 1980s

The Rolls-Royce RB529 Contrafan was a high-thrust aircraft engine proposed by Rolls-Royce in the 1980s to power long-range wide-body airliners.

== Development and design ==
The Contrafan was designed to power the four-engine Boeing 747 at a cruise speed of Mach 0.9. Like the General Electric Unducted Fan (UDF), the RB529 would have direct-drive contra-rotating fans in pusher configuration, and it would have variable pitch fan blades that were capable of reverse thrust. But a cowl would surround the fans of the engine, unlike the UDF.

The RB529 would have an engine core that was similar in size to the Rolls-Royce RB211-535E4, a 40,100-pound-force thrust (178 kN; 18,200 kgf) turbofan engine that was used to power the Boeing 757 narrow-body airliner.

== Specifications ==
Data from Flight International, 6 September 1986, pp. 3-4

==== General characteristics ====
- Type: Contra-rotating, pusher configuration ducted fan
- Length:
- Diameter: 140 in (3.6 m)
- Dry weight:

==== Components ====
- Compressor:

==== Performance ====
- Maximum thrust: 270 kN (27,000 kgf; 60,000 lbf)
- Bypass ratio: 15.6

== See also ==
- Propfan

== Bibliography ==
- Banks, Howard (29 May 1989). Slutsker, Gary (ed.). "Denver to Seoul, nonstop: The world is about to get even smaller, thanks to a new generation of jet engines that will fly planes farther on less fuel". Forbes. Vol. 143, no. 11. pp. 284, 288. ISSN 0015-6914.
- Allen, Roy (October 1986). "Farnborough '86: The intensity of competition was apparent at Farnborough, yet high costs are forcing more cooperative efforts throughout the industry". Airline Executive. Vol. 10, no. 10. pp. 30–34. ISSN 0278-6702.
- Townsend, Edward (September 1, 1986). "Jet engine to cut fuel consumption by 25%". Business and Finance. The Times. No. 62551. p. 17. ISSN 0140-0460.
- Allen, Roy (May 1986). "Contrafan: The hot prospect for Rolls-Royce?". Airline Executive. Vol. 10, no. 5. pp. 32–34. ISSN 0278-6702.
