= General Electric GE36 =

US experimental propfan

GE36
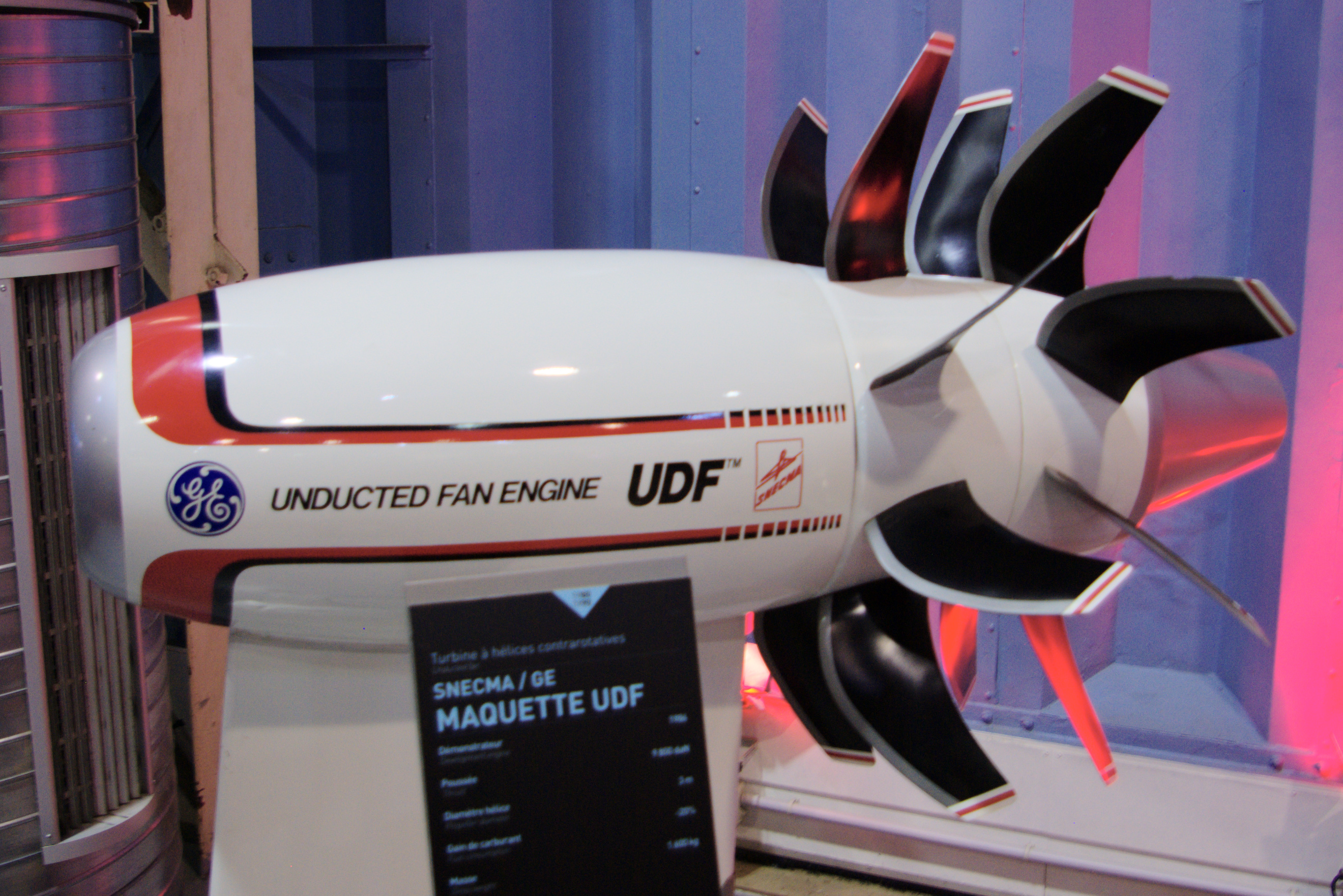
- A mockup of the GE36 at the Musée aéronautique et spatial Safran
- Type: Unducted fan
- National origin: United States
- Manufacturer: General Electric Aircraft Engines
- First run: August 29, 1985
- Major applications: Boeing 7J7 (proposed); McDonnell Douglas MD-94X (proposed)
- Number built: 2
- Developed from: General Electric F404

The General Electric GE36 was an experimental aircraft engine, a hybrid between a turbofan and a turboprop, known as an unducted fan (UDF) or propfan. The GE36 was developed by General Electric Aircraft Engines, with its CFM International equal partner Snecma taking a 35 percent share of development. Development was cancelled in 1989.

== Development ==
General Electric (GE) started performing studies and component test work on the concept that would become the UDF in 1981, based on the initial results of early National Aeronautics and Space Administration (NASA) propfan technology studies that the aerospace agency first released to engine makers in 1980. GE then followed up with full-scale development testing of the GE36 starting in 1982. NASA gave GE a $20.4 million contract in February 1984 to study the concept after the company showed the agency its work in December 1983, as NASA's own propfan research efforts were advancing at a slower pace and were dependent on additional grants from the U.S. Congress.

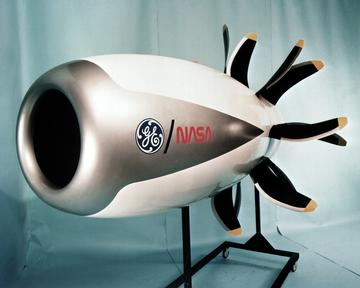
A full-scale model of the NASA/GE unducted fan at the 1984 Farnborough Air Show.

Around the same time, GE was negotiating with Boeing, which felt that the UDF technology could be useful for short-haul airliners, to test a demonstration engine on a Boeing 727 testbed aircraft. Agreement to flight test the UDF was reached in April, with flights beginning in late 1986 to assess a 25,000 pounds-force (110 kN) demonstrator based on a General Electric F404 core. The engine would have a pair of six-stage contra-rotating free turbines, each with large diameters running at slow speeds, and they would be connected directly to a couple of eight-blade, 12-foot diameter (3.7 m) unducted fans. The effective bypass ratio (BPR) was estimated to be about 30:1 for the UDF, which was much larger than the 6:1 bypass ratios of modern turbofans at the time, but less than propeller/turboprop BPRs of approximately 50:1. The optimal mission would be on 1,000 nautical miles (1,200 mi; 1,900 km) flights with a cruise speed of Mach 0.75. In May 1984, Boeing began testing a GE contra-rotating model test rig in its 9 by 9 ft (2.7 by 2.7 m) low-speed wind tunnel and 8 by 12 ft (2.4 by 3.7 m) transonic wind tunnel.

GE unveiled a full-scale model of the engine at the Farnborough Air Show in September, promising a 30-percent reduction in fuel consumption compared to current airliner engines without decreasing the cruise speed. A dozen airlines "invited themselves" to see GE's UDF test facilities near Cincinnati, Ohio, claimed the engine maker, but not just due to the UDF's higher fuel efficiency. Airlines also appreciated the UDF's lack of a gearbox, which transfers power from the turbine to the propeller while allowing both to run at their respective optimal rotational speeds, but was difficult to design reliably for high speed and power. They also liked that the UDF had contra-rotating fans, as opposed to the single-rotating fans that NASA was primarily studying. The double fans kept the diameter for a 140-seat airliner significantly smaller than the 20 ft (6.1 m) diameters the airlines feared. The unducted fan demonstrator would have a diameter of 11 ft 8 in (3.56 m), a power rating of 20,000 horsepower (15,000 kilowatts), and a thrust rating of 25,000 lbf (110 kN). The UDF demonstrator, which would have enough power to drive a 200-seat airliner, was intentionally sized to be larger than the UDF engines that GE was planning for production. The UDF production engines would be 10 ft (3.0 m) in diameter, produce 10,000 hp (7,500 kW), and power airplanes in the 120-160 seat market. At the Paris Air Show in mid-1985, Snecma announced that it had obtained a 35-percent stake in the engine program. Later in the decade, the GE36 became the power plant of choice for proposed aircraft such as the Boeing 7J7 twin-aisle airliner and the MD-91 and MD-92 derivatives of McDonnell Douglas's popular MD-80 single-aisle airplane.

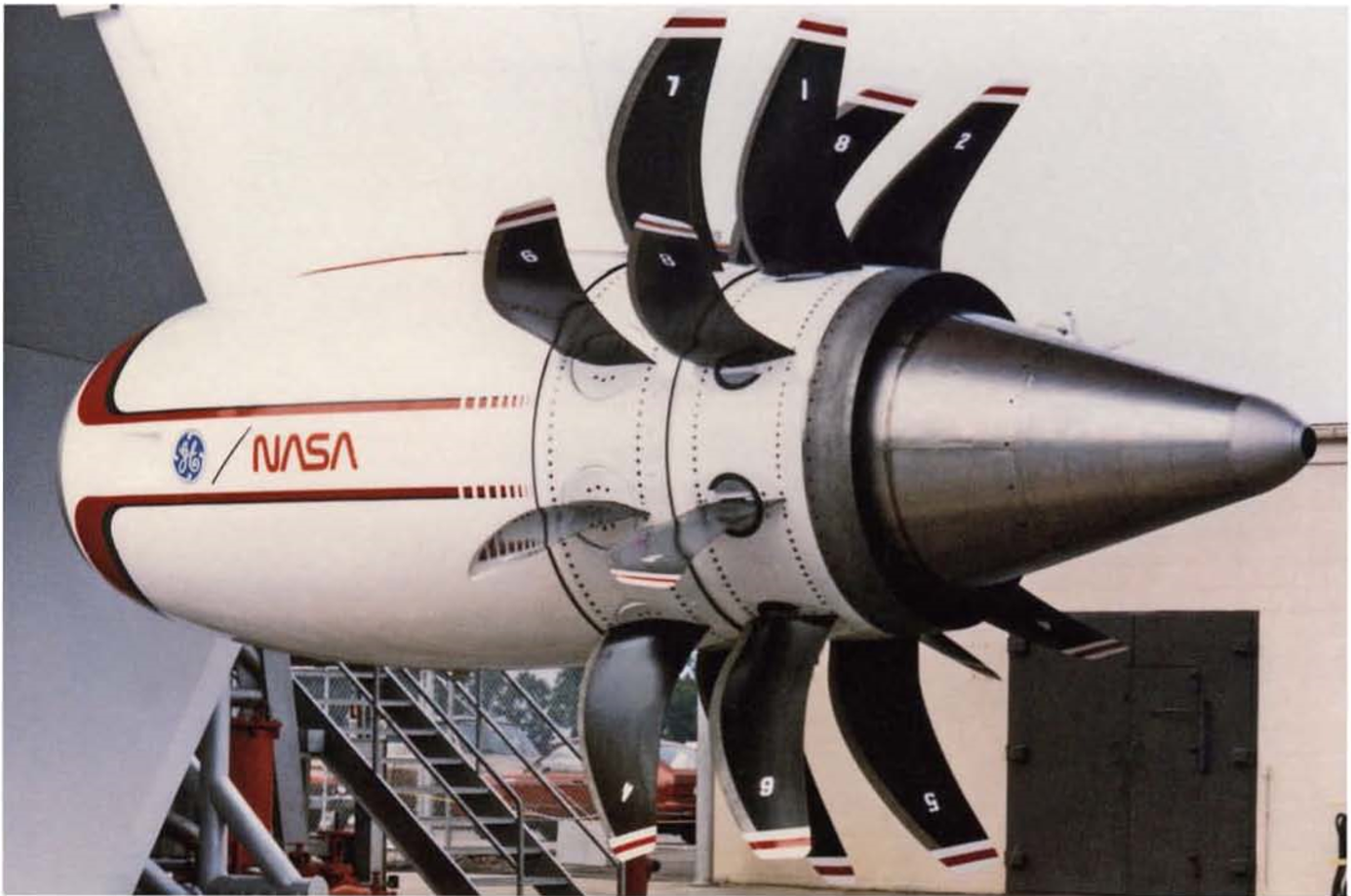
The GE36 UDF demonstrator on the ground test stand in 1985.

The engine underwent 2,500 hours of model scale testing, after which a prototype was built. The prototype engine was ground-tested for 162 hours. The GE36 prototype then flew 25 times, accumulating over 41 hours of flight test time (out of a planned 75 hours) on a Boeing 727 from August 20, 1986 until mid-February 1987, eventually reaching a flight speed of Mach 0.84 and altitude of 39,000 feet (12,000 metres). In April 1987, Boeing formally selected the GE36 as the powerplant for the Boeing 7J7, deeming the IAE SuperFan ultra-high bypass (UHB) geared turbofan as less fuel efficient and the Pratt & Whitney/Allison 578-DX geared propfan as insufficiently powered. At the Paris Air Show in June 1987, GE and Snecma noted that they were building the components for a product design engine that would test on a Boeing 727 in 1989. However, Boeing in August 1987 postponed the service entry date of the 7J7 from 1992 to 1993, and then it postponed the target date indefinitely in December 1987.

GE's proof-of-concept engine was installed on a McDonnell Douglas MD-80 on April 5, 1987, and its first flight on the MD-80 testbed was on May 18, 1987. Initially the engine had an 8-blade forward and 8-blade aft fan configuration, and then it was replaced on the testbed by the second GE36 demonstrator engine, which had a 10-blade forward / 8-blade aft setup and completed 33 hours of flight tests beginning on August 14, 1987. Despite being quieter in that configuration, the engine was swapped back to the original 8x8 configuration because of a mechanical problem. GE also confirmed that for production, there would be more blades than on the demonstrator engine, and the number of blades on the front fan would be different from the number on the back fan.

After the testbed was reconfigured with the 8x8 engine setup, McDonnell Douglas conducted 22 customer demonstration flights from the Long Beach Airport. These customer demonstrations took place between January 22 and February 26 of 1988. The flights, which typically lasted about an hour and reached a cruise speed of Mach 0.76, hosted the prime minister of Finland, 110 executives from 35 airlines and four leasing companies, and 70 representatives of media, the United States military, suppliers, and other airline manufacturers. The general opinion was that the ride quality was little different than a normal flight, except for light vibration in the back seat during takeoff and climb. On March 25, 1988, McDonnell Douglas declared the flight test program complete. The MD-80 testbed had performed 93 flights and 165 flight test hours, cruising at a speed up to Mach 0.865 and an altitude of 37,000 feet (11,000 metres).

McDonnell Douglas reinstalled the GE36 engine onto the MD-80 testbed for additional flight tests in July 1988. The testbed airplane was then flown across the Atlantic Ocean, leaving its home test airfield of Edwards Air Force Base in California to stop in Minneapolis, Minnesota, Gander, Newfoundland, Canada, and Keflavik, Iceland before ending the 4,700 nmi trip (5,400 mi; 8,700 km) in Farnborough Airport in England on August 23. The trip was made to perform daily public demonstration flights at the Farnborough Air Show on September 4–11, 1988. Private flight demonstrations for invited airline executives were to be given before the air show, and McDonnell Douglas was considering flying the testbed to Western Europe before returning to the US. At the air show, McDonnell Douglas and GE began marketing discussions with seven airlines in the US and six in western Europe; they hoped to gain about 100 airline commitments by mid-1989 to launch the MD-91 and MD-92 programs, with entry into service in 1993 first for the MD-91, and then the MD-92 entering service a half-year later. GE36 testing on the MD-80 finished that month after 137 flights and nearly 240 flight hours. In total, there were 281 hours of flight tests between the two airplanes.

With demonstrator flight testing completed, the focus moved to construction of a new core (instead of the off-the-shelf F404) to increase efficiency. The compressor, combustor, and turbine had all been run separately by late 1988, and by mid-1989 the new core engine had been tested for about 50 hours. At the time of the project cancellation later in 1989, GE and Snecma were working on the design engineering of a full gas generator and a product propulsor.

The downfall of this engine at the time was economic conditions (mostly a major drop in oil prices) post OPEC oil embargo. Even though these engines never made it past development and prototype testing, GE has retained the carbon composite technology behind the lightweight fan blades. Carbon fiber blades are currently being used in engines (General Electric GE90 and General Electric GEnx) that power the Boeing 747, Boeing 777, and Boeing 787 Dreamliner.

General Electric donated one of the GE36 engines to the Smithsonian National Air and Space Museum via the Naval Air Systems Command in 1991.

== Design ==
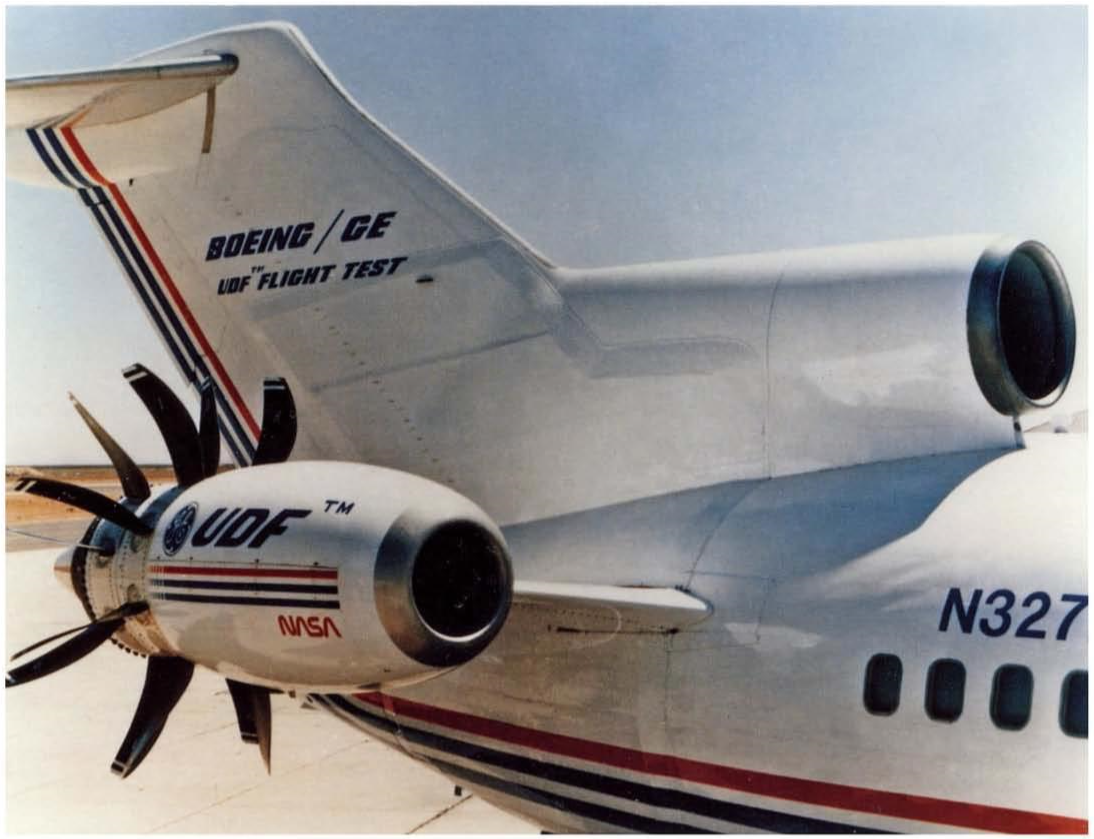
The GE36 UDF demonstrator installed on the Boeing 727 testbed in 1986.

A General Electric F404 military turbofan on loan from the American government was used as the basis for the GE36 prototype. The F404 mixed exhaust stream discharged through a turbine which drove two contra-rotating stages of fans. Although the demonstrator engines had 8x8 and 10x8 fan blade configurations, the most efficient setup that was tested had a 12x10 blade configuration. The scimitar shape of the fan rotor blades could operate at high velocities to match turbojet or turbofan speeds, allowing the engine to power the proposed Boeing 7J7 airliner at a Mach 0.83 cruise speed. The production blades for the MD-91/MD-92 versions of the engine were to be designed for Mach 0.78–0.80 cruise.

The UDF fan blades were 40 in (100 cm) in length, and the Rohr Industries-made rotating cowls that fit around the base of the blades were 62 in (160 cm) in diameter. The blades for the initial tests were manufactured directly by General Electric, but the blades for the flight tests were then made by local Ohio manufacturer Hartzell Propeller. For the production engines, the blades were to be made by British composite propeller specialist Dowty Rotol. The maximum fan diameter for the UDF demonstrator was 140 in (356 cm), while the maximum diameter for the UDF production engines was planned to be 128 in (325 cm). During the prototype/testing phase, the fan blades weighed 22.5 and 21.5 lb (10.2 and 9.8 kg) each on the front and back propellers, respectively, but they were expected to weigh less than 20 lb (9.1 kg) by the time the engine entered production.

While the GE36 demonstrator had a rated thrust of 25,000 lbf (110 kN), the GE36 family of engines would offer a range covering 12,000 to 30,000 lbf (53 to 133 kN) of thrust. The engine was initially sized to produce 14,000 lbf (62 kN) for the MD-91X and 20,000–22,000 lbf (89–98 kN) for the 7J7 and MD-92X, but the thrust requirements were later changed to 22,000 lbf (98 kN) and 25,000 lbf (110 kN), respectively.

The power turbine was a six-stage turbine plus inlet and outlet guide vanes. The twelve turbine blade rows rotated alternate rows in opposite directions. Each stage was a pair of rotors; there were no stators (static vanes), which usually follow the single-rotor section to straighten out the flow. The front propeller and the front half of each stage are attached to a rotating outer casing that encloses the turbine rotor blades, while the back propeller and the back half of each stage are attached conventionally to a central shaft. The counter-rotating turbine can run at half the rpm of a conventional turbine, since counter-rotation doubles the relative velocity, so the engine did not require a reduction gearbox to drive the fan. The GE36 had a hub-to-blade tip radius ratio of 0.425, which as a gearless design reflected about a 75 percent higher value than for geared propfan designs. This characteristic occurred because the hub had to enclose a large turbine diameter; due to the low rotational speed demanded by the contra-rotating propellers, the turbine had to be wider than usual to generate enough power. GE's UDF had a bypass ratio of 35, which was about halfway between the IAE SuperFan's BPR of 17 and the PW-Allison 578-DX's BPR of 56. The contra-rotating propellers spun at a maximum rotational speed of at least 1,393 rpm.

The engine demonstrated an extremely low specific fuel consumption (SFC) of 0.232 lb/(lbf⋅h) (6.6 g/(kN⋅s)) at ground level, which GE claimed was over 20% more efficient than any of the existing turbofans on offer. GE had also predicted a cruise SFC of 0.49 for the demonstrator engine; however, the cruise SFC would drop to 0.40-0.41 with a new gas generator design called "Supercore," compared with 0.56 for existing turbofans. The two-spool core of the gas generator would have a pressure ratio of about 36. Snecma was to design the high-pressure compressor (HPC) and the combustion chamber. The engine configuration selected for the MD-91 and MD-92 was designed to meet the Chapter 4 community noise standards of the International Civil Aviation Organization's (ICAO's) Committee on Aviation Environmental Protection (CAEP), which would go into effect in 2006 and be a reduction of ten effective perceived noise decibels (EPNdB) from the existing Chapter 3 standards that were established in 1977. The regulatory compliance, however, caused a five-percent reduction in fuel efficiency compared to the most efficient fan configuration.

== Variants ==
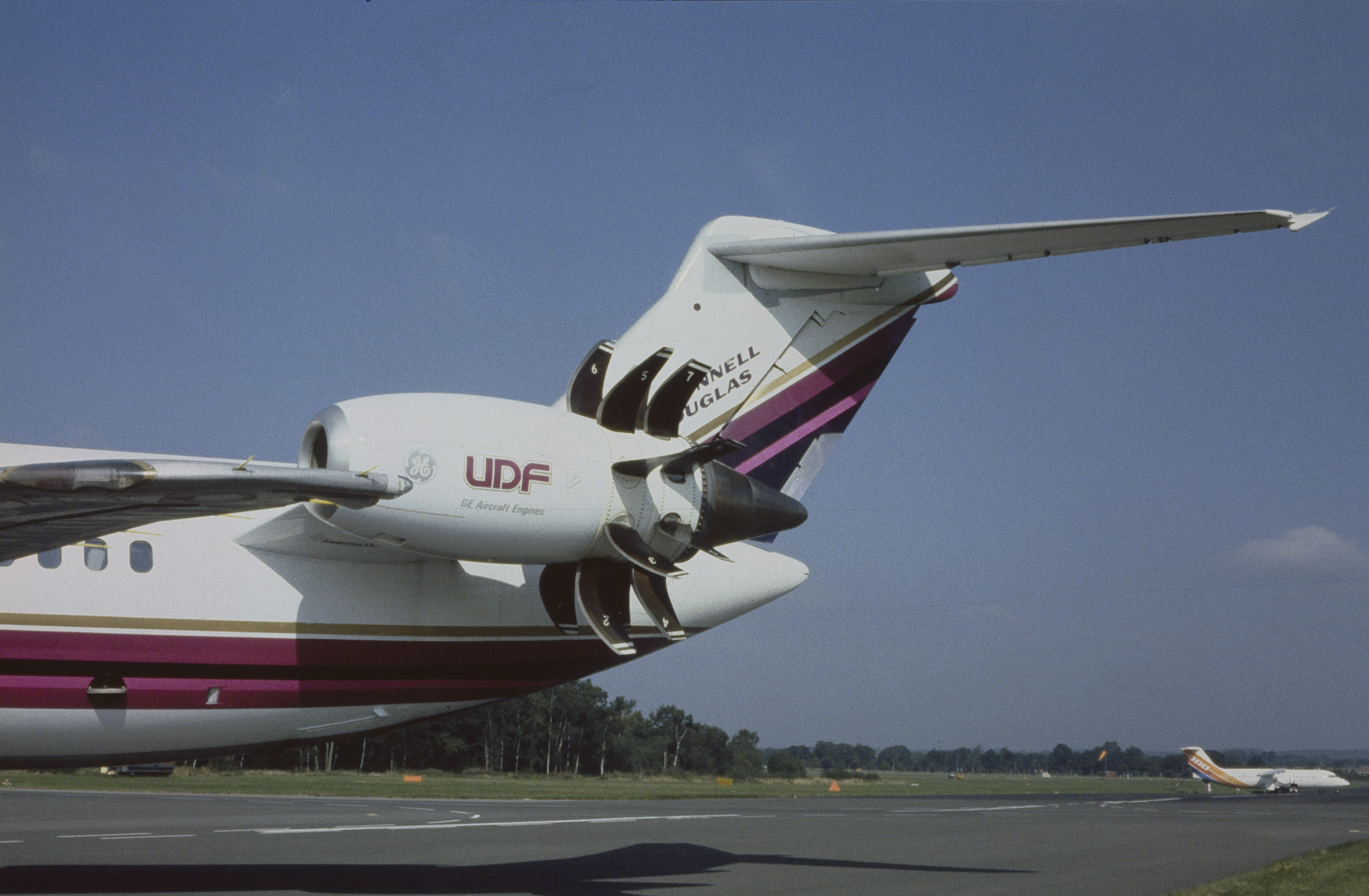
The GE36 on a McDonnell Douglas MD-81 demonstrator at the 1988 Farnborough Air Show.

GE36-B14
14,000 lbf thrust (62 kN) engine powering the McDonnell Douglas MD-91X.
GE36-B22A
25,000 lbf thrust (110 kN) engine powering the Boeing 7J7.
GE36-C22
22,000 lbf thrust (98 kN) derated engine powering the 114-seat McDonnell Douglas MD-91.
GE36-C25
25,000 lbf thrust (110 kN) engine powering the 165-seat McDonnell Douglas MD-92.

== Applications ==
- Boeing 727 (testbed)
- Boeing 7J7 (proposed)
- McDonnell Douglas MD-81 UHB testbed
- McDonnell Douglas MD-94X (proposed)

== Specifications ==
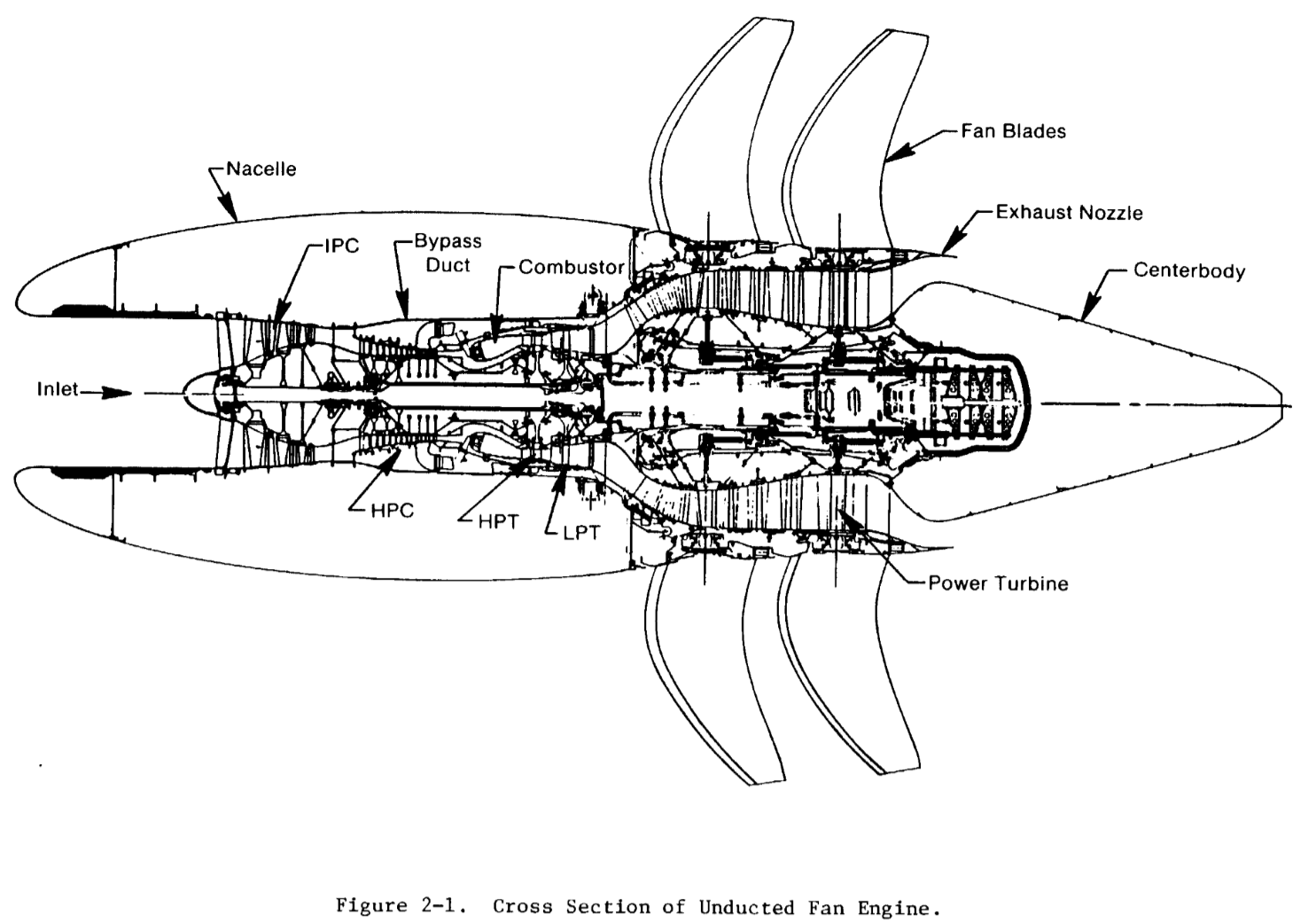
A cross-sectional diagram of the GE36 unducted fan engine.

Data from GE engine test, pages 12, 17

==== General characteristics ====
- Type: Direct-drive (gearless), contra-rotating, pusher-configuration unducted fan with modified production F404 turbofan gas generator
- Length:
- Diameter: 76.4 in (194 cm; 6.37 ft; 1.94 m) maximum nacelle diameter
- Forward fan diameter: 140.0 in (356 cm; 11.67 ft; 3.56 m)
- Aft fan diameter (10 forward blade + 8 aft blade setup): 132.0 in (335 cm; 11.00 ft; 3.35 m)
- Aft fan diameter (8 forward blade + 8 aft blade setup): 128.0 in (325 cm; 10.67 ft; 3.25 m)
- Dry weight: 6,000 lb (2,700 kg)

==== Components ====
- Compressor: 3-stage low-pressure axial flow compressor @13,270 rpm, 7-stage high-pressure axial compressor @16,810 rpm
- Turbine: 1-stage low-pressure turbine, 1-stage high-pressure turbine, 6-stage contra-rotating free power turbine

==== Performance ====
- Maximum thrust: 25,000 lbf (110 kN) @ 1,393 rpm
- Overall pressure ratio: 26:1
- Bypass ratio: 35
- Air mass flow: About 140 pounds-mass/second
- Turbine inlet temperature: Power turbine inlet: 1,310 °F (710 °C)
- Specific fuel consumption: Takeoff: 0.232 lb/(lbf⋅h) (6.6 g/(kN⋅s)); Cruise: 0.49 lb/(lbf⋅h) (14 g/(kN⋅s))
- Thrust-to-weight ratio: 8

== See also ==
- Europrop TP400
- Kuznetsov NK-12
- Kuznetsov NK-93

Related development

- General Electric F404
- General Electric GE38-B5 UDF
- General Electric GE90

Comparable engines

- Pratt & Whitney/Allison 578-DX
- Progress D-27
- Progress D-236
- Rolls-Royce RB3011

Related lists

- List of aircraft engines

== Bibliography ==
- Khalid, S. Arif; Lurie, David; Breeze-Stringfellow, Andrew; Wood, Trevor; Ramakrishnan, Kishore; Paliath, Umesh; Wojno, John; Janardan, Bangalore; Goerig, Trevor; Opalski, Anthony; Barrett, Jack (May 2013). "FAA CLEEN program open rotor aeroacoustic technology non-proprietary report" (PDF). Federal Aviation Administration. General Electric. Archived (PDF) from the original on April 23, 2022.
- Simpson, M. A.; Druez, P. M.; Kimbrough, A. J.; Brock, M. P.; Burge, P. L.; Mathur, G. P.; Cannon, M. R.; Tran, B. N. (October 1989). UHB demonstrator interior noise control flight tests and analysis (Report). Douglas Aircraft Company, McDonnell Douglas Corporation. hdl:2060/19900003882. alternate url
- "Farnborough quiet reflects sales bonanza". Air Transport World. Farnborough, England, United Kingdom. October 1988. pp. 16+. ISSN 0002-2543. Gale A6699236.
- Gavaghan, Helen (September 8, 1988). "New generation of aeroengines takes to the skies". Technology. New Scientist. Vol. 119, no. 1629. p. 44. ISSN 1032-1233.
- Whitlow, John B., Jr.; Sievers, G. Keith (August 8–11, 1988). NASA advanced turboprop research and concept validation program. Conference and Exposition on Future Transportation Technology. Society of Automotive Engineers (1988 ed.). San Francisco, California, USA. hdl:2060/19880013518. OCLC 47143980. alternate url
- Donelson, John E.; Lewerenz, William T.; Durbin, Roger T. (July 11–13, 1988). UHB demonstrator flight test program: The final step. Joint Propulsion Conference (24th ed.). Boston, Massachusetts, USA. doi:10.2514/6.1988-2807.
- Donoghue, J. A. (March 1988). "McDonnell Douglas markets MD-90 transports with G.E. UDF power". Air Transport World. Vol. 25, no. 3. pp. 37+. ISSN 0002-2543. Gale A6312130.
- Vartabedian, Ralph (February 4, 1988). "McDonnell unveils plane with revolutionary engine". Los Angeles Times. ISSN 0458-3035. OCLC 3638237.
- Hager, Roy V.; Vrabel, Deborah (1988). Advanced turboprop project. NASA SP-495. Lewis Research Center, Cleveland, Ohio: National Aeronautics and Space Administration (NASA) Scientific and Technical Information Division. hdl:2060/19890003194. OCLC 17508419. Archived (PDF) from the original on March 13, 2017. alternate url
- GE Aircraft Engines, GE36 Project Department (December 1987). Full scale technology demonstration of a modern counterrotating unducted fan engine concept: Design report. NASA. hdl:2060/19900000732. OCLC 82995299 – via Internet Archive. alternate url
- GE Aircraft Engines, GE36 Project Department (December 1987). Full scale technology demonstration of a modern counterrotating unducted fan engine concept: Engine test. NASA. hdl:2060/19900000733. OCLC 82995299 – via Internet Archive. alternate url
- GE Aircraft Engines, GE36 Project Department (December 1987). Full scale technology demonstration of a modern counterrotating unducted fan engine concept: Component test. NASA. hdl:2060/19900000731. OCLC 82995299 – via Internet Archive. alternate url
- "Paris gives strong hints of changes to come". Air Transport World. Vol. 24. July 1987. pp. 18+. ISSN 0002-2543. Gale A5026258.
- Donoghue, J. A. (July 1987). "McDonnell Douglas opens UHB flight tests". Air Transport World. Vol. 24. pp. 36+. ISSN 0002-2543. Gale A5026260.
- Harris, Robert W.; Cuthbertson, R. D. (June 29 – July 2, 1987). "UDF/727 flight test program". 23rd Joint Propulsion Conference. Joint Propulsion Conference (23rd ed.). San Diego, California, USA. doi:10.2514/6.1987-1733. OCLC 80141408.
- Donoghue, J. A. (April 1987). "SuperFan opponents dispute timing; UDF tests advance". Air Transport World. Vol. 24. pp. 42+. ISSN 0002-2543. Gale A4754028.
- "GE extols UDF results". Propulsion. Flight International. Vol. 130, no. 4042. Evendale, Ohio, USA. December 20, 1986. pp. 63–64. ISSN 0015-3710.
- "GE prepares for further UDF tests" (PDF). World News. Flight International. Vol. 130, no. 4028. Evendale, Ohio, USA. September 13, 1986. p. 2. ISSN 0015-3710.
- "Manufacturers positioning for coming competitive battles". Air Transport World. Vol. 23. September 1986. pp. 20+. ISSN 0002-2543. Gale A4426985.
- Moxon, Julian (August 9, 1986). "UDF cleared for flight" (PDF). Propulsion. Flight International. Vol. 130, no. 4023. Peebles, Ohio, USA. p. 43. ISSN 0015-3710.
- Hooper, Donald Moore (June 1986). Marketing strategy in the commercial aircraft engine business: A case study (PDF) (Thesis). Massachusetts Institute of Technology (MIT), Sloan School of Management. pp. 89–130. hdl:1721.1/14995. OCLC 655599820.
- "GE restarts UDF testing" (PDF). Propulsion. Flight International. Vol. 129, no. 3996. Evendale, Ohio, USA. February 1, 1986. p. 37. ISSN 0015-3710.
- Byzckowski, John J. (November 7, 1985). "GE fine tuning new engine: Great fuel efficiency expected". Business. Cincinnati Enquirer. pp. B–11, B–16. ISSN 2575-5706 – via Newspapers.com.
- "UDF suffers blade failure" (PDF). World News. Flight International. Vol. 128, no. 3983. Peebles, Ohio, USA. October 26, 1985. p. 3. ISSN 0015-3710.
- "UDF on target, says GE" (PDF). Propulsion. Flight International. Vol. 127, no. 3949. Evendale, Ohio, USA. March 2, 1985. p. 18. ISSN 0015-3710.
- Mordoff, Keith F. (April 9, 1984). "GE developing unducted fan for 1990s transports". Aeronautical Engineering. Aviation Week & Space Technology. New York City, New York, USA. pp. 74–75. hdl:2027/ien.35556030092613. ISSN 0005-2175 – via John Wayne Airport master plan and Santa Ana Heights land use compatibility program, Orange County, environmental impact statement, volume 4, 1985.
