= Air Transport World =

American aviation trade magazine

- Cover of the November–December 2024 issue
- Editor-In-Chief: Karen Walker
- Categories: Airlines
- Frequency: Monthly
- Founded: 1964
- Company: Informa
- Country: United States
- Based in: Washington D.C.
- Language: English
- ISSN: 0002-2543

Air Transport World (ATW) is an online and print trade publication covering the global air transportation industry. It is owned by Informa and is a sister publication to Aviation Week, the Aviation Daily and MRO Digest, which are all part of the Aviation Week Network. ATW was founded in 1964 by Joseph S. Murphy, its first editor-in-chief. It is based in Washington, D.C., and publishes a news website, a daily e-newsletter, the ATW Daily News, a print magazine, editor blogs and editorials, the annual World Airline Report, numerous annual industry reports and surveys, and the annual ATW Airline Industry Achievement Awards.

The publication was cited by news organizations and academic books for its coverage in aviation industry.

== Air Transport World ==
The publication tracks and analyzes global airline operations, market conditions, regulatory and environment developments, government affairs, global alliances, airline ticket distribution, management strategy, financials, airports and routes, aircraft and engines, the supply chain and related issues. Editors select the winners of the annual ATW Airline Industry Achievement Awards based on nominees' operational and financial performance, customer service, safety record, innovation, labor relations and executive leadership.

The publication is known for its editorials and stances on commercial aviation issues such as liberalization, safe operation of unmanned aerial vehicles in commercial airspace, common-sense consumer regulation, fair trade practices for airlines, and fair government fees and taxes on airlines.

The current editor-in-chief, Karen Walker, joined the publication in 2011. Previous chief editors include Perry Flint and J.A. Donoghue.
