= Testbed aircraft =

Aircraft used for research or testing purposes

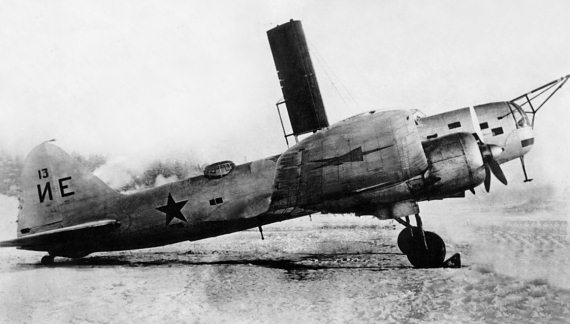
DB-3 testbed aeroplane of TsAGI for laminar wing profiles research (1940)

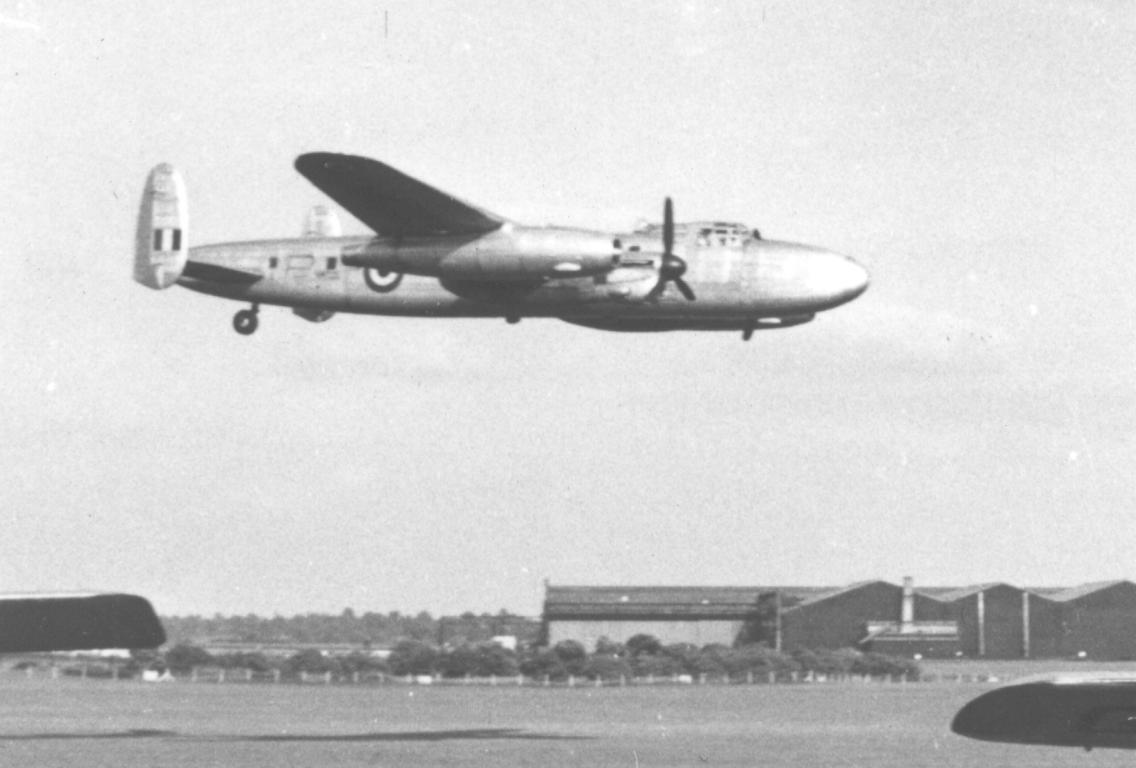
Sapphire turbojet engine fitted to an Avro 691 Lancastrian testbed (outer position), June 1954.

A testbed aircraft is an aeroplane, helicopter or other kind of aircraft intended for flight research or testing the aircraft concepts or on-board equipment. These could be specially designed or modified from serial production aircraft.

== Use of testbed aircraft ==
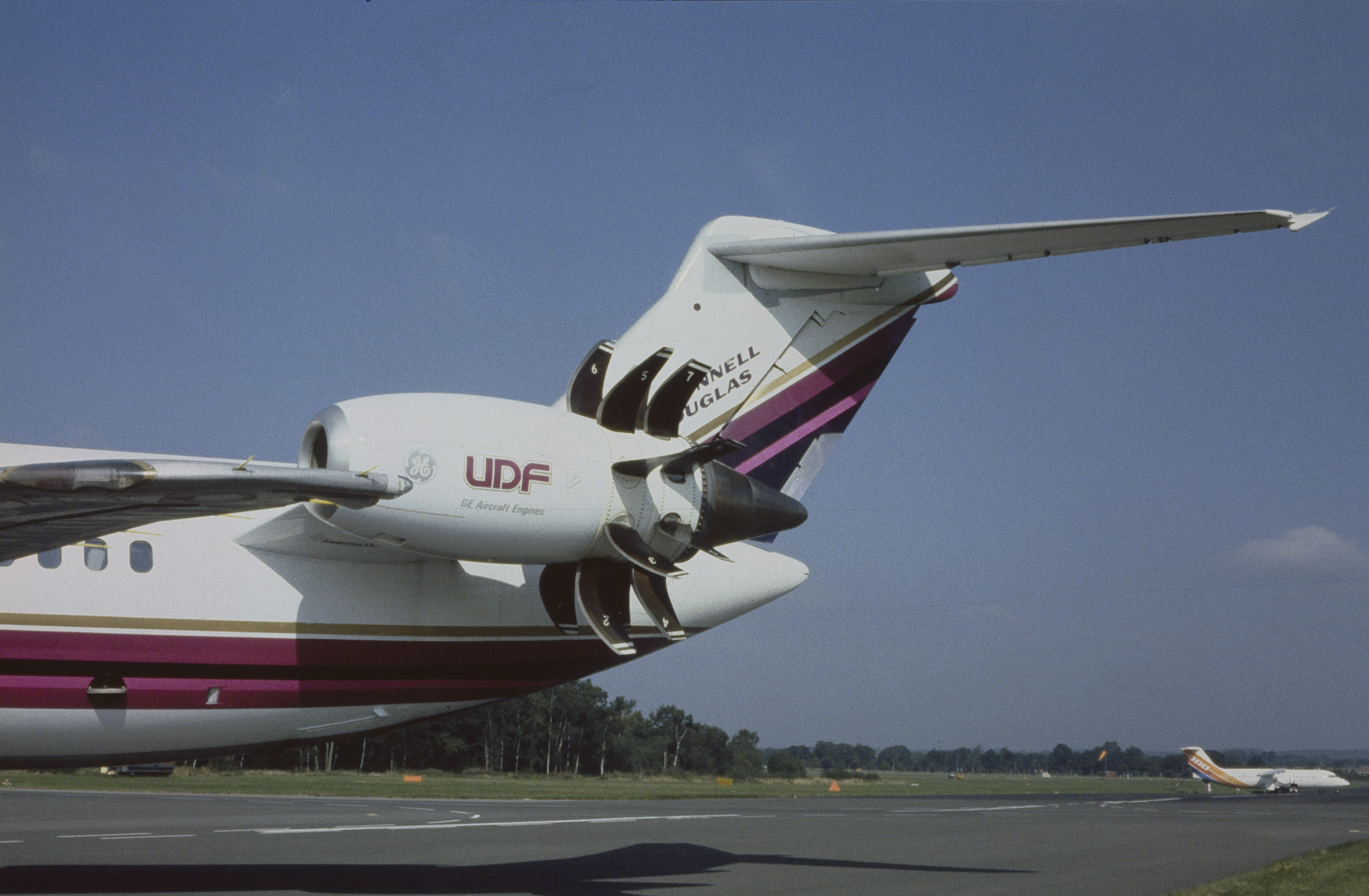
McDonnell Douglas MD-81 testbed with experimental GE36 propfan engine

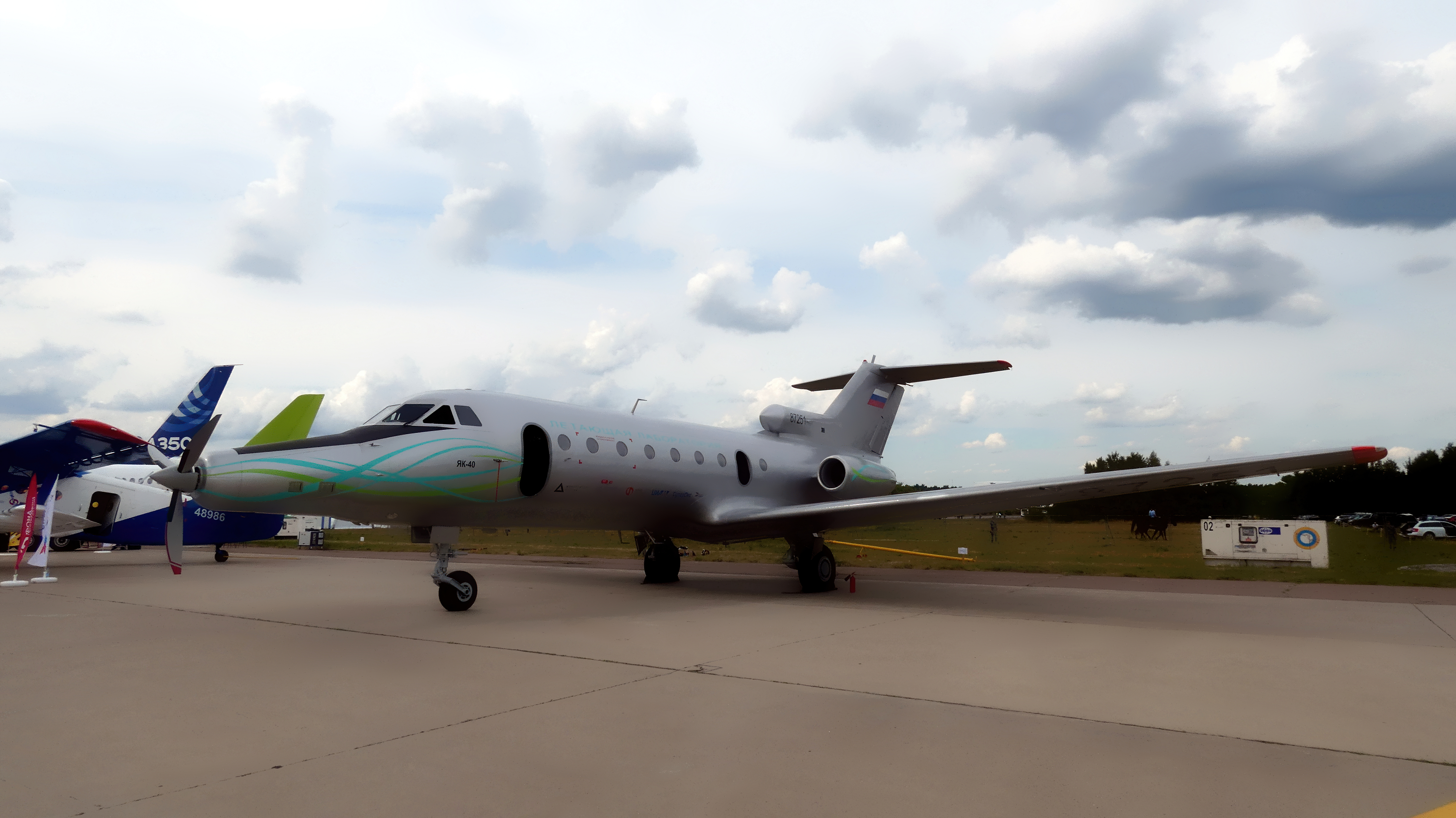
Yak-40-based testbed aircraft with a hybrid powerplant

For example, in development of new aircraft engines, these are fitted to a testbed aircraft for flight testing, before certification. New instrument wiring and equipment, a fuel system and piping, structural alterations to the wings, and other adjustments are needed for this adaptation.

The Folland Fo.108 (nicknamed the "Folland Frightful") was a dedicated engine testbed aircraft in service from 1940. The aircraft had a mid-fuselage cabin for test instrumentation and observers. Twelve were built and provided to British aero-engine companies. A large number of aircraft-testbeds have been produced and tested since 1941 in the USSR and Russia by the Gromov Flight Research Institute.

AlliedSignal, Honeywell Aerospace, Pratt & Whitney, and other aerospace companies used Boeing jetliners as flying testbed aircraft.

== See also ==
- Index of aviation articles
- List of experimental aircraft
- List of aerospace flight test centres
- Development mule
- Iron bird (aviation)
