= Contra-rotating =

Parts of a mechanism rotating in opposite directions on a common axis

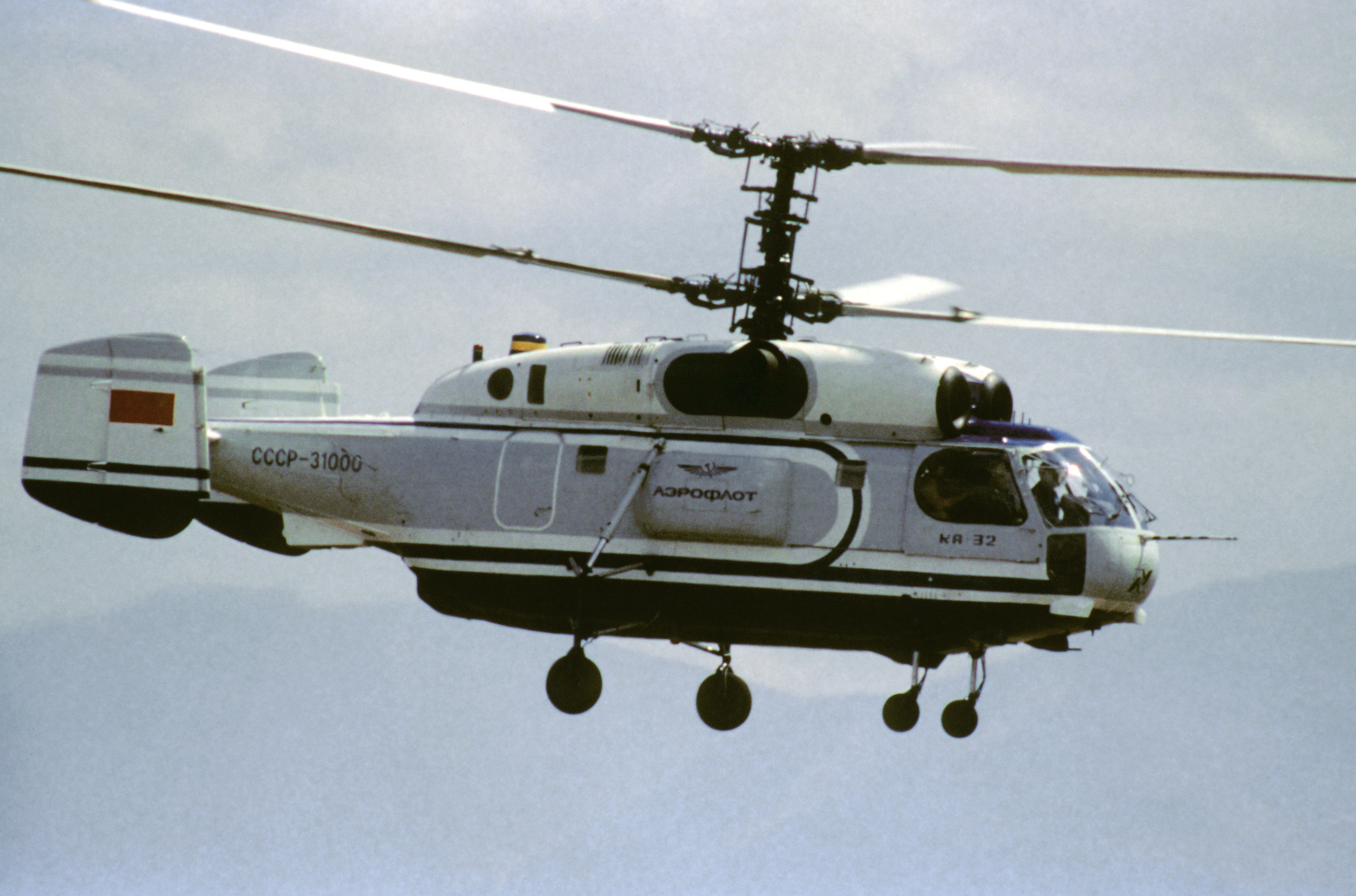
A Soviet Ka-32 helicopter with coaxial contra-rotating rotors, in 1989

Contra-rotating, also referred to as coaxial contra-rotating, is a technique whereby parts of a mechanism rotate in opposite directions about a common axis, usually to minimise the effect of torque that would be induced by a single propeller or two rotating in the same direction.

Examples include some aircraft propellers, resulting in the maximum power of a single piston or turboprop engine to drive two propellers in opposite rotation. Contra-rotating propellers are also common in some marine transmission systems, in particular for large speed boats with planing hulls. Two propellers are arranged one behind the other, and power is transferred from the engine via planetary gear transmission. The configuration can also be used in helicopter designs termed coaxial rotors, where similar issues and principles of torque apply.

Contra-rotating propellers should not be confused with counter-rotating propellers, a term which describes propellers rotating in opposite directions but sitting apart from each other on separate shafts instead of sharing a common axis. Tandem-rotor helicopters such as the CH-47 Chinook also use a counter-rotating arrangement.

The efficiency of a contra-rotating propeller is somewhat offset by its mechanical complexity. Nonetheless, coaxial contra-rotating propellers and rotors are moderately common in military aircraft and naval applications, such as torpedoes, where the added maintenance cost is not a primary concern.

The Dyson CR01 washing machine used contra-rotating drums.

== Aircraft propulsion and lift ==
While several nations experimented with contra-rotating propellers in aircraft, only the United Kingdom and Soviet Union produced them in large numbers. The U.S. worked with several prototypes, including the tail-sitting Convair XFY and Lockheed XFV "Pogo" VTOL fighters, but jet engine technology was advancing rapidly and the designs were deemed unnecessary.

Some helicopters use contra-rotating coaxial rotors mounted one above the other. The H-43 Huskie helicopter uses non-coaxial intermeshing rotors turning in opposite directions.

The F-35B variant of the F-35 Lightning II strike fighter uses a lift fan with contra-rotating blades.

== History ==
The basic idea of contra-rotating aerial propellers goes back long before hot-air balloons or airplanes. Mikhail Lomonosov's 1754 helicopter model is said to have had coaxial rotors.

== See also ==
- Contra-rotating marine propellers
