= IAE SuperFan =

Proposed geared turbofan engine

V2500SF SuperFan
- Type: Geared turbofan
- Manufacturer: International Aero Engines
- Major applications: Airbus A320 (175-seat stretch); Airbus A340; Boeing 7J7
- Number built: 0
- Developed from: IAE V2500

The IAE V2500SF SuperFan was a design study for a high-bypass geared turbofan derived from the IAE V2500. It was offered as the primary engine option for the Airbus A340-200 and 300 in January 1987. Although several customers signed preliminary contracts for this variant, the International Aero Engines board decided in April 1987 to stop the development of the SuperFan, which forced Airbus to partly re-design the A340.

== Development program ==
In July 1986 IAE confirmed to conduct a preliminary design study for a concept examining a high-bypass engine which used the V2500 core components. The engine's projected maximum thrust was 28,000–32,000 lbf while having only 80% of the V2500's specific fuel consumption. Prior to that study the IAE shareholders Rolls-Royce plc, Pratt & Whitney and MTU Aero Engines had examined several configuration for a high-bypass engine, including several design features like a variable fan blade pitch, a geared fan or counterrotating concepts (geared as well as ungeared). Review of these design studies in June indicated the design of such a high-bypass engine as a single-rotation, geared fan configuration with variable blade pitch. The fan diameter was expected to range from 108 to 118 in while having a bypass ratio of 18:1 to 20:1. Availability of the engine was estimated between 1992 and 1994. In December 1986 the V2500 SuperFan was officially offered to Airbus as powerplant for the Airbus A340 being developed at that time. With that offer, more design details were revealed. In addition to the V2500 core engine, IAE claimed to be able to derive all further components from proven technology. The RB211-sized fan was to be driven through a Tyne-technology gearbox. This configuration had a 20:1 bypass ratio and was expected to provide a thrust of 30,000 lbf. Due to the application of existing technology, the costs as well as the risks for the SuperFan development program were appraised lower than those of the competing CFM56-5 engine. Due to the lower specific fuel consumption and higher thrust rating, the design of the A340 was modified. Compared to the original design's range of 7,000 nautical miles, the revised version – designated the A340-200 – was projected to have a range up to 8,000 nautical miles with full passenger load. Airbus decided on 26 December 1986 to offer the SuperFan as primary engine option for the A340. In late January, Boeing announced that it was studying the SuperFan as an option for the 150-seat 7J7 mid-range aircraft, with the SuperFan mounted under the wings instead of the aft fuselage mounting of the 7J7's baseline engine, the General Electric GE36 unducted fan. (The 7J7, not the A340, was actually IAE's primary target aircraft for the SuperFan.) Airbus was also considering the SuperFan for a 175-seat stretched version of its upcoming Airbus A320 narrowbody aircraft.

Timeline of events
| Date | Event |
|---|---|
| July 1986 | IAE announces its SuperFan engine concept. |
| 26 December 1986 | Airbus adds the SuperFan as an engine offering for its proposed new A340 airplane. |
| 15 January 1987 | Airbus announces its first sale of the A340: a purchase from Lufthansa of 15 jets with options for 15 more, using the SuperFan engine. |
| 23 January 1987 | Boeing offers the SuperFan as an alternative engine option for its proposed new 7J7 airplane. |
| 13 March 1987 | Airbus announces that it has 104 orders from nine airlines for its proposed new A330/A340 series of aircraft. |
| 19 March 1987 | IAE partner Rolls-Royce says that it has not decided whether to launch the SuperFan. It also says the consortium would need several months to decide on a final SuperFan design, and that it didn't know whether it could meet the mid-1992 target date for SuperFan delivery to Airbus. |
| 31 March 1987 | IAE misses Airbus's deadline for firm A340 engine proposals. |
| 3 April 1987 | Northwest Airlines orders 20 A340 aircraft from Airbus. |
| 6 April 1987 | Airbus eliminates the SuperFan as an initial engine offering for the A340. |
| 7 April 1987 | IAE delays the development of the SuperFan indefinitely. |
| 8 April 1987 | Boeing eliminates the SuperFan as a 7J7 engine offering. |

First voices indicating not only the high risks associated with the new geared turbofan technology but also the potential failure to deliver the SuperFan in time appeared in February 1987. In addition to the fact that the V2500 was not certified yet, not even a mockup of the SuperFan was published, not to mention a test engine. At the same time Deutsche Lufthansa and Airbus signed a preliminary contract for 15 orders and 15 options of the A340 with SuperFan engines. First deliveries were agreed for April 1992. Reinhardt Abraham (vice chairman of the Lufthansa board) stated that Lufthansa acknowledges the risks connected to the SuperFan program but got binding guarantees by IAE for the performance data and the delivery date. He also described the SuperFan as a rather conservative technology compared to the several Propfan programs that gained a lot of attention at that time. In contradiction to that, officials of Douglas Aircraft – responsible for the A340 competitor MD-11 – questioned the timetable for the SuperFan. In addition to the missing demonstrator and test engine, the feasibility of the required 20,000 SHP gearbox was challenged. Competitor CFM International even completely ruled out the possibility to develop the SuperFan concept in the remaining time until 1992. Despite these concerns, Airbus was able to announce at a meeting of the supervisory board on 13 March 1987 a total of 104 commitments from nine customers for their A330/A340 program. On 3 April, Northwest Airlines announced their commitment for up to 20 A340s with SuperFan engines. Of the now-ten customers for the A330/A340 program, eight ordered the A340 with SuperFan engines; in addition to Lufthansa, the list of SuperFan customers included Finnair, UTA, Sabena, and Alitalia. In a board meeting on 7 April 1987, however, the SuperFan program was officially announced as "indefinitely delayed".

No official statement was made after that decision, but Ralph Robins, managing director of Rolls-Royce and board member of IAE, indicated problems with the low-pressure system posed a serious threat to deliver the engine in 1992. Airbus was formally notified about the technical risk in mid-March. He insisted that the problems IAE faced at the same time with the high-pressure compressor of the V2500 were not connected to the SuperFan delay. IAE also contended that the SuperFan was not more than an engineering study and they never committed to develop that engine. Nevertheless, further studies of the geared turbofan concept were announced. In contradiction to IAE's understanding of the SuperFan as an engineering study, the vice chairman of the Lufthansa board, Reinhardt Abraham, made clear that the Lufthansa board had received verbal as well as written confirmations that the SuperFan was a fixed development program. He admitted that Lufthansa had realized the risks in the SuperFan program but had relied on the experience and reputation of the IAE shareholding companies. When asked for the delay's reason, he revealed that in a meeting at the beginning of 1987 IAE presented several technical problems that had arisen: not only the gearbox was mentioned, but also the variable-pitch mechanism and the bypass outlet duct. But in Abraham's opinion these problems could have been solved by investing more, he blamed the problems with the V2500 high-pressure compressor as the trigger to cancel the SuperFan. This assumption is supported by the fact, that a core engine which is optimized for a conventional turbofan, can not be used for a geared turbofan without extensive modifications to prevent compressor surge during low thrust ratings. Lufthansa's engineers recommended against buying the A340 because of doubts of the engine's readiness by 1992, but they were overruled by Lufthansa chairman Heinz Ruhnau with the backing of Franz Josef Strauss, who was both a Lufthansa supervisory board member and the Airbus chairman. When it was clear that the SuperFan would not be available, Airbus decided to offer the CFM56-5C on the A340. In order to achieve comparable performance data to the SuperFan-powered version, the wingspan was extended by 2.6 meters to allow a larger fuel capacity.

== Design features ==
The fan diameter of the SuperFan was planned to be 107 in (2.72 m), resulting in a nacelle with a diameter of 120 in (3.05 m) made from composite materials. To ensure a good performance also in partload ratings and to support the thrust reverser, a variable-pitch mechanism for the 18 fan blades would have been installed. The blades itself were designed as hollow titanium blades. The fan blades would be shrouded by a cowling, but unlike with normal turbofans, the fan cowling would not extend backward, and the rest of the engine would be enclosed in a separate, slimmer cowling. The fan gearbox with a gear ratio of 3:1 would have been derived from the Rolls-Royce Tyne gearbox, so it can be concluded that the SuperFan gearbox would have been realised as a planetary design with single helical gearing.

== Specifications ==
Data from

==== General characteristics ====
- Type: Two-spool high-bypass-ratio geared turbofan
- Length:
- Diameter: 107 in (272 cm; 8 ft 11 in; 2.72 m)
- Dry weight:

==== Components ====
- Compressor: single-stage fan, 3-stage low-pressure compressor, 10-stage high-pressure compressor
- Turbine: 2-stage high-pressure turbine, 3-stage low-pressure turbine

==== Performance ====
- Maximum thrust: 30,000 lbf (133 kN)
- Bypass ratio: 17.5

== See also ==
- Geared turbofan

Related development

- IAE V2500

Comparable engines

- Honeywell ALF 502//LF 507
- Garrett TFE731
- Kuznetsov NK-93
- Pratt & Whitney PW1000G
- Turbomeca Aspin/Astafan
- Rolls-Royce/SNECMA M45SD

Related lists

- List of aircraft engines

== Bibliography ==
- Banks, Howard (29 May 1989). Slutsker, Gary (ed.). "Denver to Seoul, nonstop: The world is about to get even smaller, thanks to a new generation of jet engines that will fly planes farther on less fuel". Forbes. Vol. 143, no. 11. pp. 284, 288. ISSN 0015-6914.
- Learmount, David (13 June 1987). "How long, how thin, how many? A trijet and two twins are available for long, thin routes, and a four-jet is promised". Flight International. Vol. 131, no. 4066. Long Beach, California; Seattle, Washington; and Toulouse, France. pp. 94–96. ISSN 0015-3710.
- Townsend, Edward (June 10, 1987). "Partners who battle it out". World Aerospace: A Special Report. The Times. London, England, UK. p. 20. ISSN 0140-0460.
- "Lufthansa vice president Reinhardt Abraham: Relationship to Airbus and IAE engine consortium strained. Rolls-Royce's shortage of time stopped the SuperFan". Handelsblatt. Translated by Joint Publications Research Service (JPRS). 18 May 1987. p. 23. ISSN 0017-7296.
- "Northwest orders A340 despite SuperFan delay" (PDF). World News. Flight International. Vol. 131, no. 4057. Toulouse, France. 11 April 1987. p. 2. ISSN 0015-3710. Archived from the original (PDF) on 28 July 2014.
- Gavaghan, Helen (19 March 1987). "Engine worries delays Airbus payment". This Week. New Scientist. Vol. 113, no. 1552. p. 17. ISSN 1032-1233.
- International Aero Engines (2 February 1987). "Reaching beyond old limits with new technologies". Aviation Week & Space Technology. p. 51. ISSN 0005-2175.
- "International Aero Engines". Special Advertising Section. Aviation Week & Space Technology. 2 February 1987. p. 59. ISSN 0005-2175.
- "IAE proceeds with SuperFan" (PDF). World News. Flight International. Vol. 130, no. 4042. East Hartford, Connecticut, USA. 20 December 1986. p. 2. ISSN 0015-3710.
- Marsh, David (20 November 1986). "Five-nation consortium offers new engine for A-340". World Trade News. Financial Times. No. 30089. p. 5. ISSN 0307-1766.
