= Dassault Falcon 30 =

French prototype jet aircraft

Falcon 30
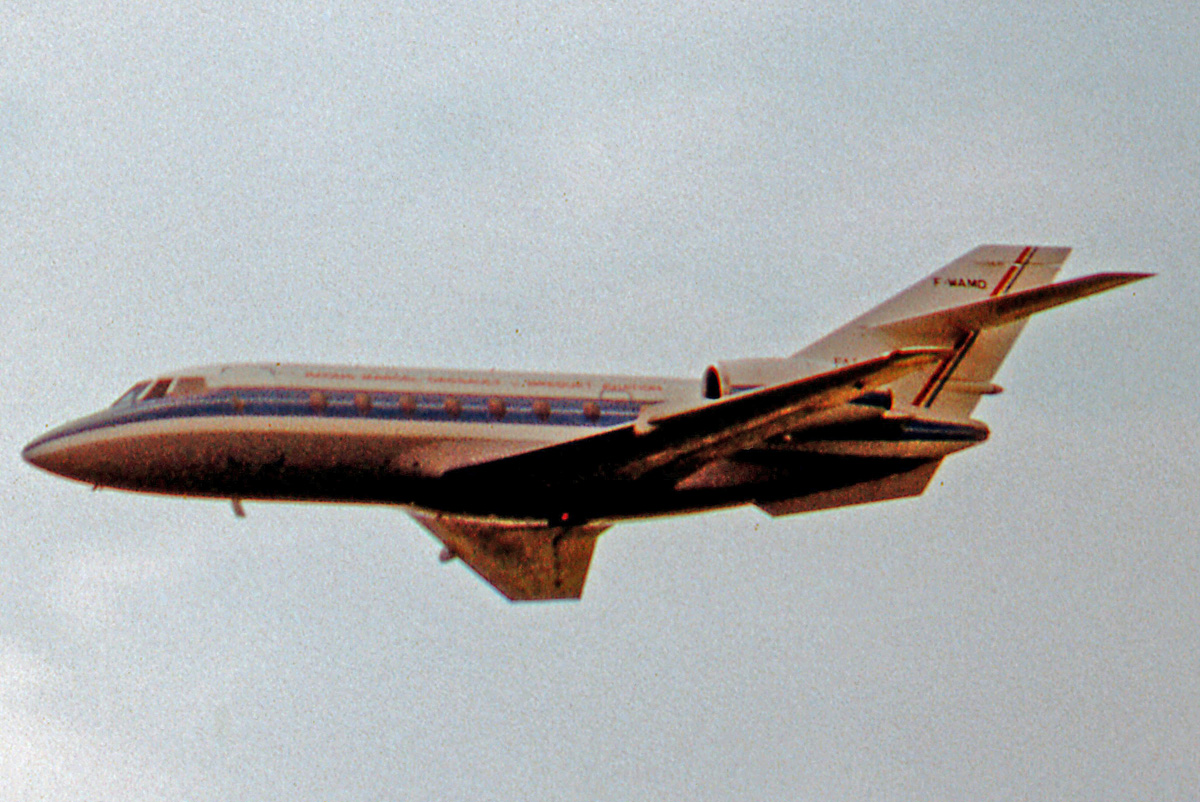

General information
- Type: Regional airliner
- National origin: France
- Manufacturer: Dassault Aviation
- Number built: 1

History
- First flight: 11 May 1973
- Developed from: Dassault Falcon 20

The Dassault Falcon 30 was a prototype French jet-powered regional airliner of the 1970s. It was developed by Dassault Aviation from its successful Falcon 20 business jet, and was larger with more powerful engines, with capacity to carry 40 passengers. A single prototype was built, flying for the first time on 11 May 1973, but no production followed.

== Design and development ==
=== Initial proposals ===
Dassault Aviation first began work on airliner derivatives of the Mystère 20 business jet (later known as the Falcon 20) in January 1963, with the Mystère 30, which was planned to carry 30–40 passengers over a distance of 1,500 km (810 nmi; 930 mi). The Mystère 30 was publicly announced in January 1964, and commercial agreements made with the German company Siebelwerke/ATG to help build the aircraft. Despite interest from several airlines, including the Australian Ansett Airlines and the American Eastern Airlines (who planned to buy 20–40 Mystère 30s), the project did not proceed owing to the absence of suitable engines. In 1970, seeing that French regional airlines were showing interest in the Soviet Yakovlev Yak-40 trijet transport, Marcel Dassault ordered design work to start on a new small jet airliner, the Falcon 20T, which would combine the wings, tail engines and undercarriage of the Falcon 20 with a new fuselage accommodating 24 passengers. A mockup of the Falcon 20T was exhibited at the 1971 Paris Air Show and generated considerable interest, but the General Electric CF700 turbofans as used by the Falcon 20 did not give the take-off performance needed to operate out of the small airports used by regional airlines, so the project was suspended.

=== Falcon 30 ===
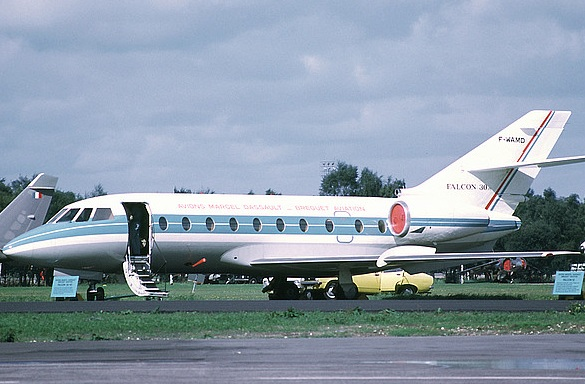
Falcon 30

Later that year, the availability of a new engine, the Avco Lycoming ALF 502, a geared turbofan based on the T55 turboshaft engine used by the Boeing Chinook helicopter, enabled work to restart. Use of the ALF 502 resulted in significant redesign of the aircraft reducing commonality with the Falcon 20. The heavier engine resulted in the forward fuselage being lengthened by 80 cm (31 in) for centre-of-balance reasons, which in turn allowed an additional window and more seats to be fitted. A new larger wing centre-section was fitted, to reduce wing loading and increase fuel capacity, while the aircraft's tail was enlarged to compensate for the larger engine nacelles. With these changes the Falcon 20T became the Falcon 30.

The Falcon 30 was a low-wing cantilever monoplane with swept wings and of all-metal construction. It had a retractable tricycle landing gear. The two engines were mounted in individual nacelles on each side of the aircraft's rear fuselage. The aircraft's circular section fuselage was of increased diameter compared with the Falcon 20 on which it was based, with a diameter of 2.37 m (7 ft 9 in) compared with 2.03 m (6 ft 8 in) for the Falcon 20. The flight crew of pilot and copilot sat side by side in the cockpit, while the aircraft's cabin accommodated 30 passengers plus cabin crew. A compartment for baggage and other cargo was at the rear of the fuselage. Alternatively, when used as a business jet, 8–15 passengers could be carried.

Construction of the prototype was completed on 24 March 1973, and after ground testing, it made its first flight at Dassault's Mérignac works on 11 May 1973. It was transferred to Paris–Le Bourget Airport on its ninth flight for exhibition at that years Paris Air Show. In July the aircraft was returned to the factory for modifications, with the fuselage being lengthened by 40 cm (16 in) and the horizontal tail surface being enlarged. A second prototype was proposed that would reflect the planned production configuration. This would use more powerful versions of the ALF 502 and have the fuselage diameter increased again, to 2.44 m (8 ft 0 in), allowing four-abreast seating to be fitted. This would be available in two versions. The Falcon 30 was intended for US operators, where Federal Aviation Regulations limited aircraft used by local airlines to 30 passengers, and would carry these passengers over a range of 1,980 km (1,070 nmi; 1,230 mi). The Falcon 40 (a joint venture with Aérospatiale) was aimed at European markets which were not subject to the same constraints, and would carry 40 passengers over 1,380 km (750 nmi; 860 mi). (Note: Sources are inconsistent about the naming of the two versions - de Narbonne uses Falcon 30 and Falcon 40, Jane's All the World's Aircraft uses Falcon 30 and Mystère 40, while Dassault uses both forms (i.e. Falcon 30 / Falcon 40 and Mystère 30 / Mystère 40).)

=== Cancellation ===
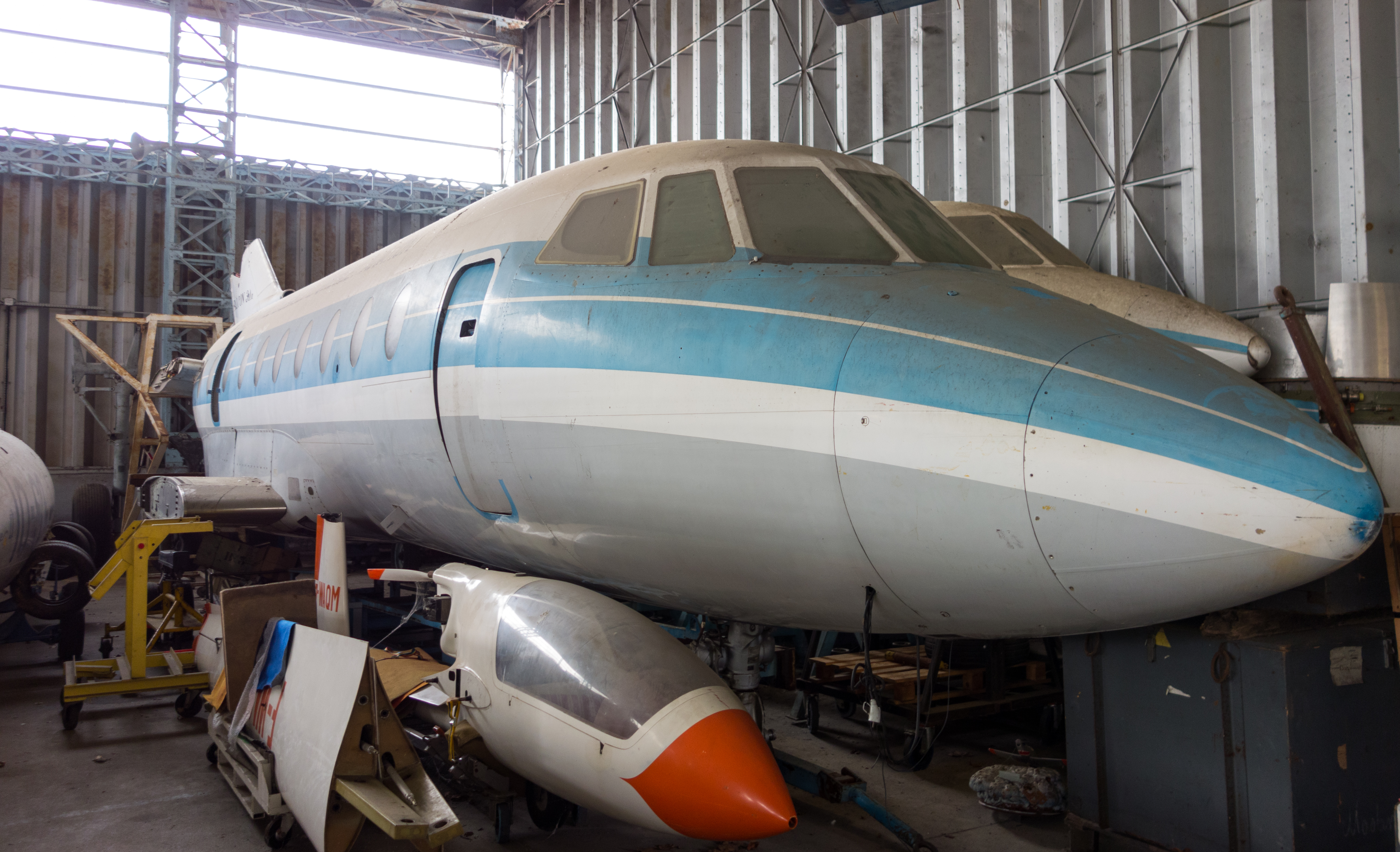
Falcon 30 fuselage in storage at Conservatoire de l'Air et de l'Espace d'Aquitaine in September 2018.

Dassault's management had set a target of 100 orders before launching production. While the small-package carrier FedEx Express, which already operated a large fleet of Falcon 20s, was interested in buying 30 aircraft, and some European airlines might operate a few, with TAT having an option on four Falcon 40s, this was not sufficient, with the 1973 oil crisis reducing interest, with the jet powered Falcon being more expensive to purchase than its turboprop competitors. When the Falcon 40 was presented to users of the Falcon 20, much more interest was shown in the Falcon 25, a three-engine derivative of the Falcon 20 that promised greater range, with the three-engine layout being preferred by customers for long-range flight over water. As there was still considerable development work to be done on the Falcon 30/40, with the aerodynamics of the rear fuselage requiring revision and high cabin noise levels from the ALF 502 engines, in 1974 Dassault decided to abandon the Falcon 30 and 40 in favour of the Falcon 25, which promised to be cheaper to develop. (Note: Dassault's website says the Falcon 30 and 40 projects were abandoned in 1975.) The Falcon 25 went on to become the Dassault Falcon 50 business jet.

The prototype Falcon 30 was disassembled, with the fuselage being given to a technical school, and later donated to the Conservatoire de l'Air et de l'Espace d'Aquitaine museum. and the outer wings being kept by Dassault for further use, being incorporated into a Falcon 20F in 1984.

== Specifications (Falcon 30) ==
Data from Jane's All the World's Aircraft 1974–75

General characteristics

- Crew: 2
- Capacity: 30 passengers
- Length: 19.87 m (65 ft 2 in)
- Wingspan: 18.03 m (59 ft 2 in)
- Height: 6.05 m (19 ft 10 in)
- Wing area: 49.0 m^{2} (527 sq ft)
- Empty weight: 10,050 kg (22,156 lb)
- Max takeoff weight: 16,000 kg (35,274 lb)
- Fuel capacity: 5,300 L (1,400 US gal; 1,200 imp gal)
- Powerplant: 2 × Lycoming ALF 502D turbofan, 27.0 kN (6,070 lbf) thrust each

Performance

- Cruise speed: 830 km/h (520 mph, 450 kn) at 7,600 m (25,000 ft) (max cruise)
- Range: 1,980 km (1,230 mi, 1,070 nmi) (30 passengers, typical reserves)

== See also ==
Related development

- Dassault Falcon 20

Aircraft of comparable role, configuration, and era

- Canadair Challenger
- VFW-Fokker 614
- Yakovlev Yak-40
