= Garrett TFE731 =

Turbofan aircraft engine

TFE731
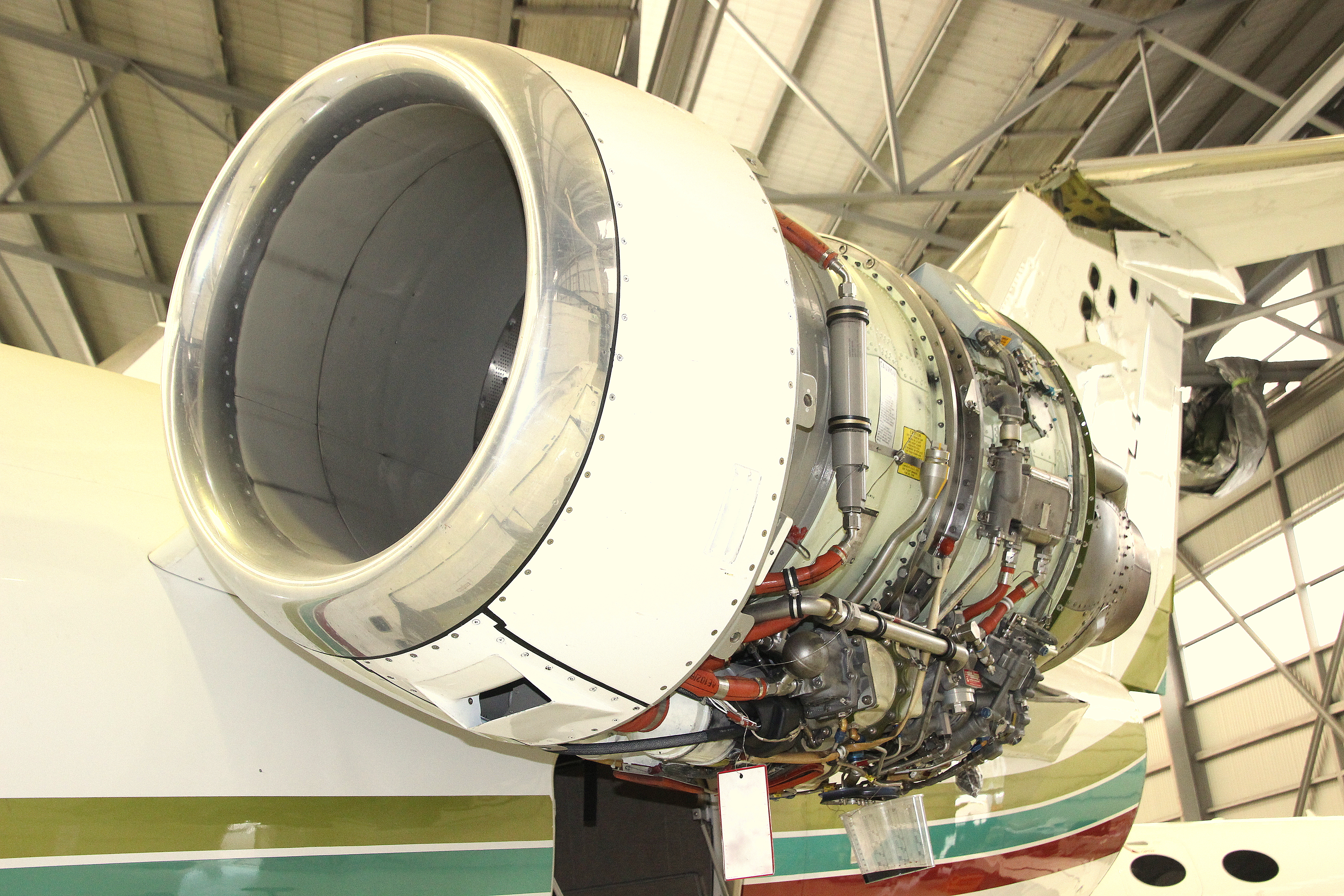
- TFE731-4R of a Cessna Citation VII
- Type: Geared turbofan
- National origin: United States
- Manufacturer: Garrett AiResearch; Honeywell Aerospace
- First run: 1970
- Major applications: AIDC AT-3; CASA C-101; Cessna Citation III; Hongdu JL-8; Dassault Falcon 900; Hawker 800; Learjet 31; Textron AirLand Scorpion; Lockheed Martin RQ-170 Sentinel
- Number built: 11,000+
- Developed into: Honeywell/ITEC F124/F125

The Garrett TFE731 (now Honeywell TFE731) is a family of geared turbofan engines commonly used on business jet aircraft. Garrett AiResearch originally designed and built the engine, which due to mergers was later produced by AlliedSignal and now Honeywell Aerospace.

Since the engine was introduced in 1972, over 11,000 engines have been built, flying over 100 million flight-hours.

== Development ==
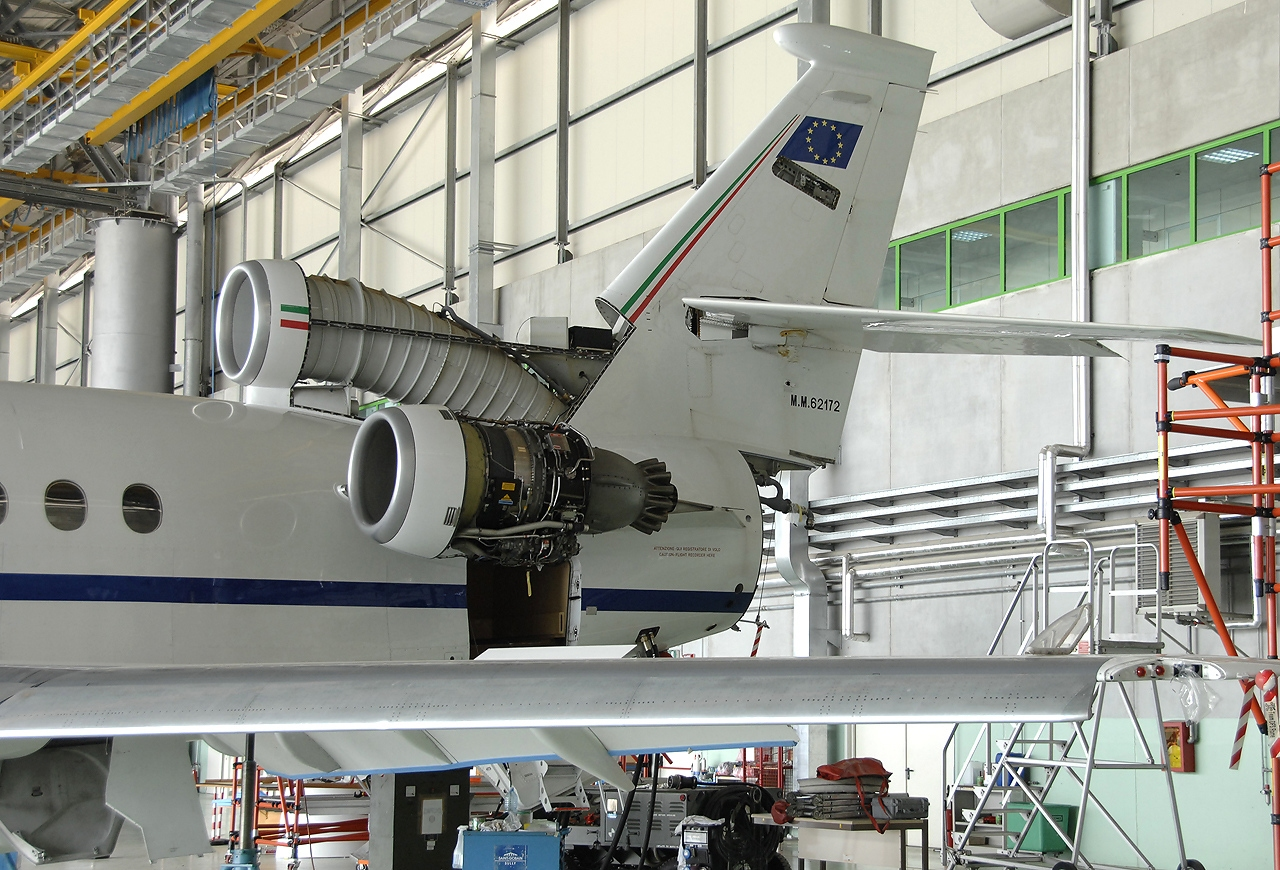
Honeywell TFE731 and S-duct intake of a Dassault Falcon 900EX exposed during maintenance

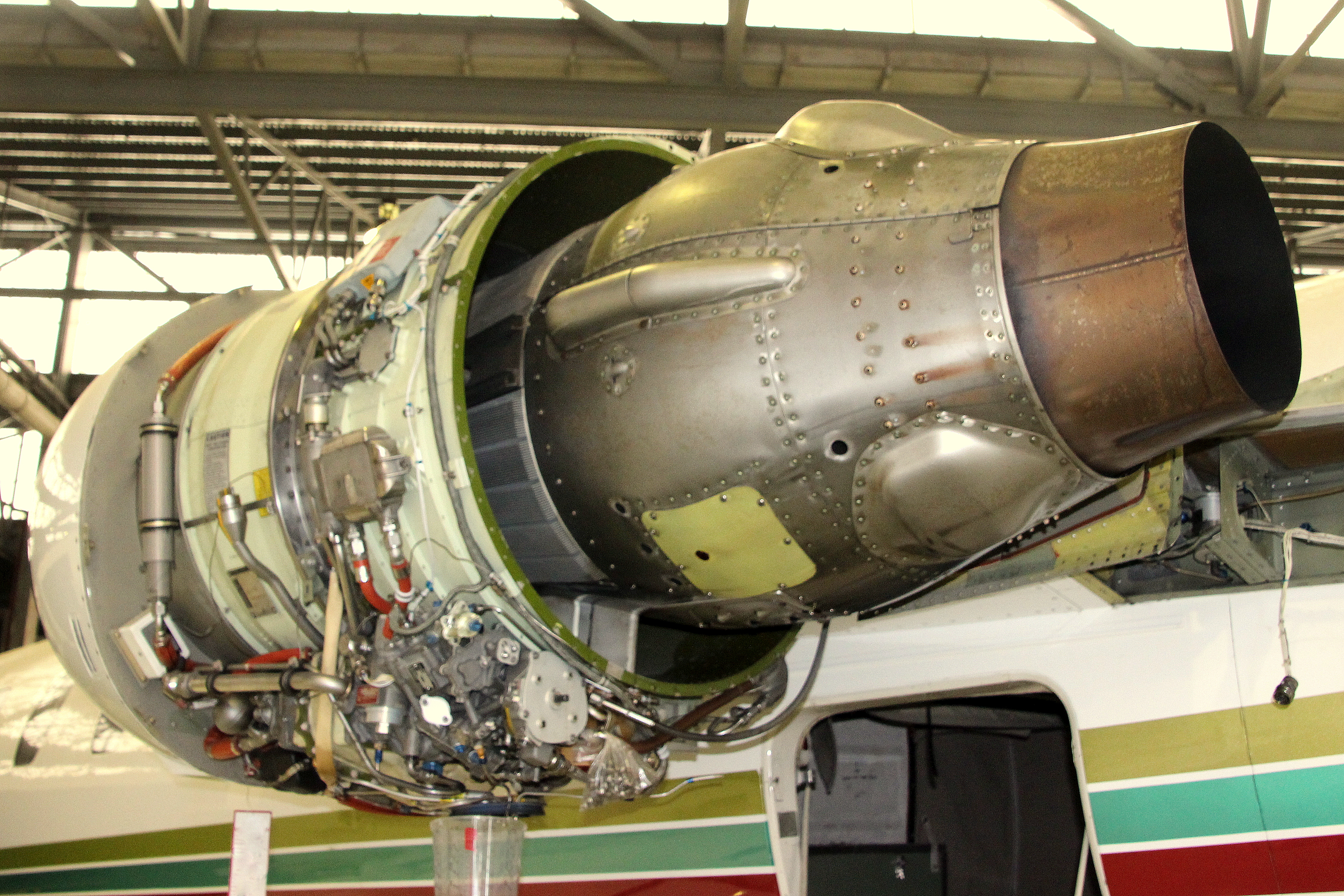
View of a TFE731-4R in maintenance with cowlings, afterbody and thrust reverser removed

The TFE731 was based on the core of the TSCP700, which was developed for use as the auxiliary power unit (APU) on the McDonnell Douglas DC-10. The design featured two important factors: low fuel consumption, and low noise profiles that met the newly established U.S. noise abatement regulations.

The first test run of the TFE731 occurred in 1970 at Garrett's plant in Torrance, California. The first production model, the TFE731-2, began rolling off the assembly line in August, 1972, and was used on the Learjet 35/36 and Dassault Falcon 10, both of which entered production in 1973.

The TFE731-3 was developed for use in the Lockheed JetStar re-engining program, and subsequent versions of it have been used on a number of aircraft, including the Learjet 55.

In 1975, the TFE731 was named Aviation Product of the Year by Ziff-Davis Publishing Company.

The -5 model was certified in 1982, and a decade later, an engine utilizing the TFE731-5 power section and a TFE731-3 fan was built and designated the TFE731-4, intended to power the Cessna Citation VII aircraft.

The most recent version is the TFE731-50, based on the -60 used on the Falcon 900DX, which underwent its flight test program in 2005. Honeywell has developed this engine complete with nacelle as a candidate to retrofit a number of aircraft equipped with older engines.

== Design ==
The TFE731-60 has an inlet diameter of 0.787 m. The fan consists of 22 fan blades, 52 exit-guide vanes, and 10 struts, and is driven by a gearbox. The five-stage compressor has four axial LP stages and one radial, or centrifugal, HP stage.

== Variants ==
TFE731-2
TFE731-3
TFE731-4
TFE731-5
TFE731-20
TFE731-40
TFE731-50
TFE731-60
TFE731-1100

== Applications ==
Jet trainers

- Aero L-139 (prototype only)
- AIDC AT-3
- Boeing Skyfox
- CASA C-101
- FMA IA 63 Pampa
- Hongdu JL-8
- Textron AirLand Scorpion

Business jets

- BAe 125/Hawker 800
- Cessna Citation III/VI/VII
- Dassault Falcon 10
- Dassault Falcon 20 (retrofit)
- Dassault Falcon 50
- Dassault Falcon 900
- Gulfstream G100 (ex IAI Astra)
- IAI Westwind
- Learjet 31
- Learjet 35
- Learjet 40
- Learjet 45
- Learjet 55
- Learjet 70
- Lockheed JetStar/Jetstar II
- North American Sabreliner 65
- Experimental Yak-40MS upgrade

== Specifications ==
Data from FAA

==== General characteristics ====
- Type: Geared turbofan
- Length: 49.7 in (126 cm)
- Diameter: 39.4 in (100 cm)
- Dry weight: 743–899 lb (337–408 kg)

==== Components ====
- Compressor: 1 stage fan, 1.8:1 gearbox, 4 axial LP stages, 1 centrifugal HP stage
- Combustors: Annular
- Turbine: 1 stage HP turbine (N2 max. 29,692-30,540 RPM), 3 stage LP turbine (N1 max. 20,688-21,000 RPM)

==== Performance ====
- Maximum thrust: 3,500–4,750 lbf (15.6–21.1 kN)
- Overall pressure ratio: 13:1
- Bypass ratio: 2.8:1
- Fuel consumption: 875 lb/h (397 kg/h)
- Specific fuel consumption: 0.469–0.517 lb/lbf/h (0.0133–0.0146 kg/kN/s)
- Thrust-to-weight ratio: 4.7-5.3

== See also ==
- Geared turbofan

Related development

- Honeywell/ITEC F124/F125

Comparable engines

- IAE SuperFan
- Lycoming ALF 502/LF 507
- Pratt & Whitney PW1000G
- Rolls-Royce/SNECMA M45SD
- Turbomeca Aspin/Astafan

Related lists

- List of aircraft engines
