= Honeywell TSCP700 =

Small turboshaft

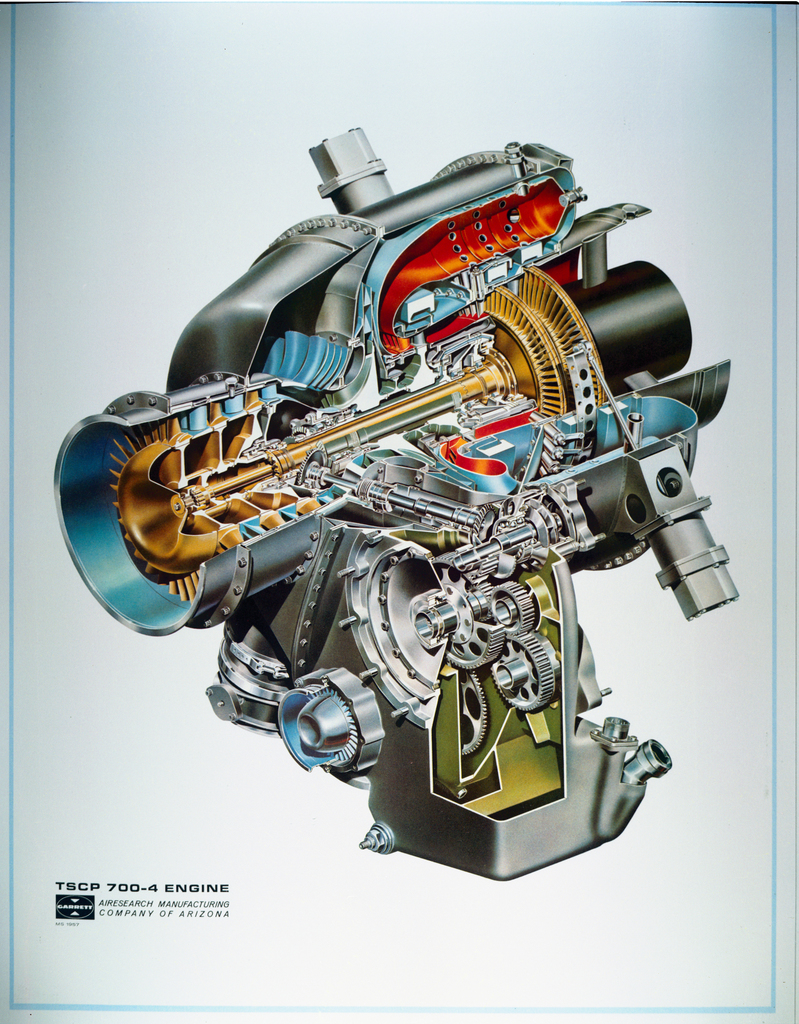
Technical drawing. Air Intake is on the left

Honeywell TSCP700 is a small turboshaft, used as auxiliary power unit on wide-body airliners.

== Origin and use ==
It was initially developed by Garrett AiResearch, for use as an APU for McDonnell Douglas DC-10. Garrett was merged into AlliedSignal in 1985, then into Honeywell in 1999. Honeywell still provide support for the TSCP700's in circulation. Besides the DC-10, it is also used as APU on the MD-11 and Airbus A300/A310.

== Design ==
TSCP700 provides a mechanical output of 105 kW (for TSP700-5 version used on Airbus aircraft). It has a two-shaft architecture. The compressor design is quite peculiar, as the LP compressor is axial and the HP compressor is centrifugal. After the HP compressor, air is fed to a combustion chamber, and blown through two turbines. The first high-pressure turbine drives the HP compressor and provides the "useful" output (driving, e.g., a power generator), while the second, low-pressure turbine drives the LP compressor shaft.

== Derivative ==
A small geared turbofan named Garrett TFE731 was developed from TSCP700, borrowing its internal parts. It was successfully marketed for business jets and military trainer aircraft.
