= Turbomeca Orédon (1947) =

Orédon (1947 APU)
- Type: turboshaft / Auxiliary Power Unit (APU)
- National origin: France
- Manufacturer: Turbomeca
- First run: 1947
- Developed into: Turbomeca Piméné

The Turbomeca Orédon was a small French turbo-shaft / Auxiliary Power Unit (APU) engine produced by Turbomeca in the late 1940s.

Developed as a turbo-shaft / APU derivative of the TR 011 turbojet, the Orédon drove an alternator and was used as an aircraft auxiliary power unit. “Orédon” was reused for a later helicopter turboshaft design.

The Turbomeca Piméné, a larger turbojet version of the TR 011 / TT 782 / Orédon, was developed with greater mass-flow and single-stage turbine.

== Variants ==
Orédon TT 782
Auxiliary Power Unit similar to the Piméné, but smaller, with the gas generator driving an alternator through a gearbox.

== Specifications ==
Data from Aircraft engines of the World 1953

==== General characteristics ====
- Type: turboshaft / APU
- Length: 870 mm (34 in) without alternator
- Diameter:
- Dry weight: 81 kg (179 lb) with gearbox, 106 kg (234 lb) with alternator

==== Components ====
- Compressor: 1-stage centrifugal
- Combustors: single annular combustion chamber with rotary disc fuel injector
- Turbine: 2-stage axial
- Fuel type: kerosene
- Oil system: dry sump with Turbomeca gear pump at 1.4 bar (21 psi)

==== Performance ====
- Maximum thrust: ::Max continuous: 0.89 kN (200 lbf) at 34,000 rpm / sea level

Cruising: 0.78 kN (175 lbf) at 33,000 rpm / sea level

- Overall pressure ratio: 3.44:1
- Air mass flow: 1.25 kg/s (2.8 lb/s) at 35,000 rpm at sea level
- Turbine inlet temperature:

Before turbine: 850 °C (1,560 °F; 1,120 K)
After turbine: 700 °C (1,292 °F; 973 K)

- Specific fuel consumption: 0.59 kg/kWh (0.97 lb/(hp⋅h))
- Thrust-to-weight ratio: 2
