= Turbomeca Piméné =

1940s French turbojet engine

Piméné
- Type: Turbojet
- National origin: France
- Manufacturer: Turbomeca
- First run: 1948

The Turbomeca Piméné was a small French turbojet engine produced by Turbomeca in the early 1950s.

First shown at the 1949 Paris Air Show this engine passed official type tests in 1950. A similar, but not directly related, smaller turboshaft, known as the Turbomeca Orédon, drove an alternator and was used as an aircraft auxiliary power unit,

== Variants ==
TR-011
small 0.785 kN (176 lb_{f}) turbojet engine, precursor to the Orédon APU.
Piméné
enlarged 1.079 kN (243 lb_{f}) higher mass flow development of the TR-011 / Orédon.

== Applications ==
- EFW N-20
- Fouga CM.8
- Fouga CM.101R
- Fouga CM.88 Gemeaux

== Specifications ==
Data from Aircraft engines of the World 1953, Aircraft engines of the World 1950

==== General characteristics ====
- Type: turbojet
- Length: 880 mm (35 in) (1,094 mm (43.1 in) with exhaust duct
- Diameter: 408 mm (16.1 in)
- Dry weight: 54 kg (119 lb)

==== Components ====
- Compressor: single-stage centrifugal compressor with 14 vanes
- Combustors: single annular combustion chamber
- Turbine: single-stage
- Fuel type: kerosene
- Oil system: dry sump with Turbomeca gear pump at 3.0 bar (43 psi)

==== Performance ====
- Maximum thrust:

Take-off: 1.1 kN (240 lbf) at 36,000 rpm / sea level
Max continuous: 0.89 kN (200 lbf) at 34,000 rpm / sea level
Cruising: 0.78 kN (175 lbf) at 33,000 rpm / sea level

- Overall pressure ratio: 4:1
- Air mass flow: 2 kg/s (4.4 lb/s) at 36,000 rpm at sea level
- Turbine inlet temperature:

Before turbine: 850 °C (1,560 °F; 1,120 K)
After turbine: 700 °C (1,292 °F; 973 K)

- Specific fuel consumption: 108.3 kg/kN/h (1.062 lb/lbf/h)
- Thrust-to-weight ratio: 2.077 at take-off thrust

== See also ==
Related lists

- List of aircraft engines
