= Fouga CM.8 =

Single-seat French glider, 1949

CM.8
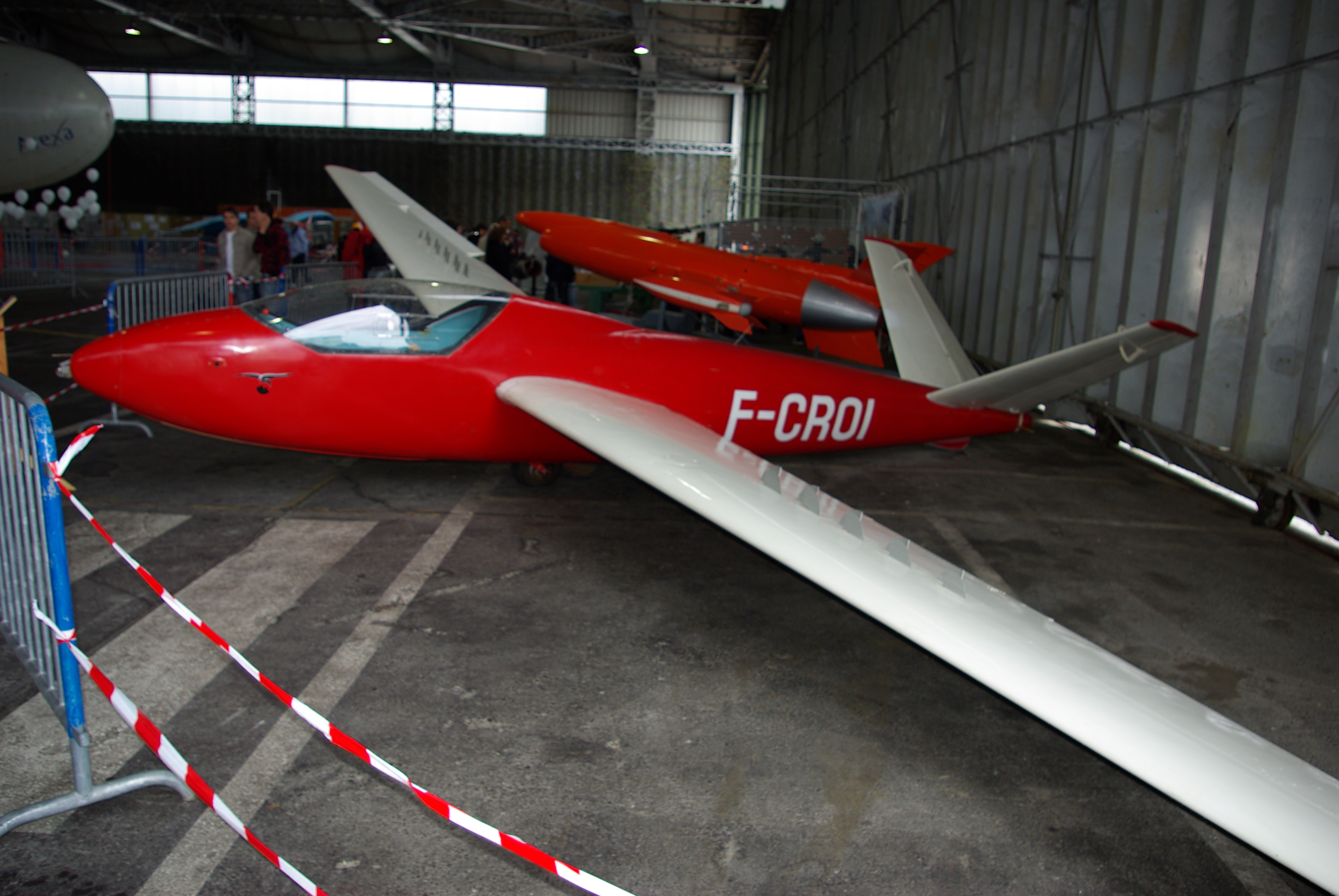

General information
- Type: High-performance sailplane
- Manufacturer: Fouga

History
- First flight: June 1949
- Variants: Fouga CM.88 Gemeaux

The Fouga CM.8 or Castel-Mauboussin CM.8 was a French sailplane of the 1950s, most notable in retrospect due to its place in the development of the Fouga CM.170 Magister jet trainer.

== Design and development ==
The CM.8 was a single-seat aircraft of conventional sailplane design and designed for aerobatics. Two prototypes were built: the CM.8/13, with a 13-metre wingspan and a conventional empennage, and the CM.8/15 with a 15-metre wingspan and a V-tail.

The pleasing performance of these aircraft led to experiments with mounting a small turbojet on the dorsal fuselage, exhausting between the tail fins. The first of these flew on 14 July 1949, powered by a Turbomeca Piméné. Designated the CM.8R this combined the 13-metre wing of the CM.8/13 with the tail of the CM.8/15. Two examples were built, and as experiments progressed in the 1950s, they were fitted with increasingly powerful engines, and increasingly shorter wingspans. A twin-fuselage example was also built as the CM.88 as an engine testbed.

== Variants ==
Fouga CM.8
Fouga CM.8 Acro
Fouga CM.8/13
Fouga CM.8/15
Fouga CM.8/13 Sylphe démotorisé
Fouga CM.8 R13 Cyclone
Fouga CM.8 R13 Sylphe II
Fouga CM.8 R13 Sylphe III
Fouga CM.8 R9.8 Cyclope I
Fouga CM.8 R9.8 Cyclope II
Fouga CM.8 R8.3 Midget
Version intended for air racing, powered by 264 lbf (1.17 kN) Turbomeca Palas engine, with fuselage of Cyclope, and wings of reduced span (7.07 m (23 feet 2 inches)) and area 8.3 m^{2} (89 sq ft). Small production series (eight – twelve) built.

== Specifications (CM.8/13) ==
Data from Jane's All the World's Aircraft 1951–52

General characteristics

- Crew: One pilot
- Length: 6.55 m (21 ft 6 in)
- Wingspan: 13.00 m (42 ft 8 in)
- Height: 1.95 m (6 ft 5 in)
- Wing area: 13.0 m^{2} (140 sq ft)
- Aspect ratio: 13:1
- Empty weight: 247 kg (545 lb)
- Gross weight: 330 kg (728 lb)

Performance

- Never exceed speed: 275 km/h (171 mph, 148 kn)
- Rate of sink: 1.22 m/s (240 ft/min)

== See also ==
Related lists

- List of gliders

== Bibliography ==
- Bridgman, Leonard (1951). Jane's All The World's Aircraft 1951–52. London: Sampson Low, Marston & Company, Ltd.
- Bridgman, Leonard (1952). Jane's All The World's Aircraft 1952–53. London: Sampson Low, Marston & Company, Ltd.
- de Narbonne, Roland (June 2009). "Juin 1949, dans l'aéronautique française: Des graines d'avenir : la bonne et la mauvaise". Le Fana de l'Aviation (in French). No. 475. p. 77–79.
- de Narbonne, Roland (May 2012). "Mai 1952, dans l'aéronautique française: Le Fouga "Midjet" qui resta sur la ligne de départ". Le Fana de l'Aviation (in French). No. 510. p. 78.
- Taylor, Michael J. H. (1989). Jane's Encyclopedia of Aviation. London: Studio Editions. p. 239.
- Planeurs et Avions
