= Turbomeca Aspin =

Turbofan engine produced by Turbomeca

Aspin
- Type: Turbofan
- National origin: France
- Manufacturer: Turbomeca
- First run: 1951

The Turbomeca Aspin was a small French turbofan engine produced by Turbomeca in the early 1950s. This geared turbofan design was the first turbofan to fly, powering the Fouga Gemeaux test-bed aircraft on 2 January 1952.

== Variants ==
Aspin I
200 kg (440 lb) thrust
Aspin II
350 kg (770 lb) thrust

== Applications ==
- Fouga CM.88 Gemeaux

== Specifications (Aspin II) ==
Data from Aircraft engines of the World 1953.

==== General characteristics ====
- Type: Geared turbofan
- Length: 1,614 mm (63.5 in)
- Diameter: 604 mm (23.8 in)
- Dry weight: 138 kg (304 lb)

==== Components ====
- Compressor: Single-stage geared axial flow fan, single-stage centrifugal flow compressor
- Combustors: Annular combustion chamber
- Turbine: Two-stage axial flow turbine
- Fuel type: Kerosene
- Oil system: Dry sump, Turbomeca gear pump at 5.9 bar (85 psi)

==== Performance ====
- Maximum thrust:

Take-off: 3.6 kN (800 lbf)
Max Continuous: 3.14 kN (705 lbf)

- Overall pressure ratio:

Fan: 1.15:1 at 35,000 rpm / sea level
Compressor: 3.8:1 at 35,000 rpm / sea level

- Air mass flow:

Fan:21 kg/s (46 lb/s) at 35,000 rpm / sea level
Compressor:3.0 kg/s (6.6 lb/s) at 35,000 rpm / sea level

- Specific fuel consumption: 53 kg/kN/h (0.52 lb/lbf/h)
- Thrust-to-weight ratio: 2.632

== See also ==
- Ducted fan
- Propfan
- Geared turbofan

Related development

- Turbomeca Astazou
- Turbomeca Astafan

Comparable engines

- Honeywell ALF 502/LF 507
- Garrett TFE731
- Pratt & Whitney PW1000G
- IAE SuperFan

Related lists

- List of aircraft engines
