= Fouga CM.88 Gemeaux =

1950s French engine test-bed aircraft

CM.88 Gemeaux

General information
- Type: Engine test-bed
- National origin: France
- Manufacturer: Fouga
- Number built: 1

History
- First flight: 1951
- Developed from: Fouga CM.8

The Fouga CM.88 Gemeaux was a 1950s French engine test-bed aircraft produced by Fouga. An unusual aircraft, it was two aircraft joined by a common wing.

== Design and development ==
To meet a requirement to use as an engined testbed for Turbomeca turbojets, Fouga combined two CM.8 fuselages. It used the port and starboard outerwings with a new wing centre section to join the two fuselages. The V-tails fitted to each fuselage were joined at the top in a W configuration. The type was designated the Fouga CM.88-R Gemeaux I and first flew 6 March 1951, it was fitted with two Turbomeca Piméné turbojets, one on top of each fuselage. Further variants were produced as the engine fit was changed.

== Variants ==
Gemeaux I
Original configuration with two 220 lb (100 kg) Turbomeca Piméné turbojet engines, first flown 6 March 1951.
Gemeaux II
Designation when powered by one 606 lb (275 kg) Turbomeca Marboré I turbojet engine, first flown 16 June 1951.
Gemeaux III
Designation when powered by one prototype 772 lb (350 kg) thrust Turbomeca Marboré II turbojet engine and first flown on 24 August 1951. A production version of the engine with 882 lb (400 kg) thrust was flown on 2 January 1952.
Gemeaux IV
Designation when powered by one 441 lb (200 kg) thrust Turbomeca Aspin I turbofan engine, first flown on 6 November 1951.
Gemeaux V
Final designation when powered by one 794 lb (360 kg) thrust Turbomeca Aspin II turbofan engine, first flown on 21 June 1952.

== Specifications (Gemeaux III) ==
Data from

General characteristics

- Crew: 1
- Length: 6.66 m (21 ft 10 in)
- Wingspan: 10.76 m (35 ft 4 in)
- Height: 1.93 m (6 ft 4 in)
- Wing area: 12.8 m^{2} (138 sq ft)
- Airfoil: root: NACA 23014; tip: NACA 23012
- Empty weight: 890 kg (1,962 lb)
- Max takeoff weight: 1,170 kg (2,579 lb)
- Powerplant: 1 × Turbomeca Marboré II turbojet engine, 3.92 kN (882 lbf) thrust

Performance

- Maximum speed: 249 km/h (155 mph, 134 kn)
- Service ceiling: 10,000 m (33,000 ft)

== See also ==
Related lists

- List of experimental aircraft
