= Turbomeca Astafan =

Astafan
- Type: Variable-pitch turbofan
- National origin: France
- Manufacturer: Turbomeca
- First run: 1969
- Developed from: Turbomeca Astazou

The Turbomeca Astafan is a single-spool, variable-pitch turbofan engine developed from the Turbomeca Astazou. Despite successful flight-testing, an efficient, quiet and clean design (compared to turbojets and conventional turbofans) and some commercial interest, the Astafan never entered series production. The engines were only flown on the Fouga 90 prototype and Turbomeca's two test aircraft.

== Design ==
The engine combines an Astazou-derived centrifugal compressor with up to three axial compressor stages (depending on the version of the engine), driven by a common driveshaft. The fan section is composed of a unique variable pitch fan and fixed stator blades mounted at the front of the engine. Blade pitch is varied by a hydraulic piston mounted in the fan hub, while the fan itself is powered via a reduction gear from the main driveshaft.

The engine is designed to operate at a constant speed, no matter the thrust output—a characteristic permitted by the Astafan's use of precise fuel metering and fan blade pitch adjustment. To control the engine, the pilot first sets the speed lever, which adjusts fuel flow in proportion to the selected engine speed. Then the pilot moves the thrust lever (analogous to a throttle), actuating the fan pitch piston by way of a mechanical linkage and hydraulic valve, and varying the blade pitch. In response, the speed governor holds engine speed steady by adjusting fuel delivery to the combustor. The control system also monitors turbine temperature and adjusts blade pitch (and therefore engine load) to maintain it within the preferred range of 350 °C to 450 °C. Additionally, the system automatically protects against excessive fuel delivery or unusual changes in blade pitch. Using the thrust lever, pilots can start an Astafan in fine pitch (for minimal resistive torque), select takeoff (coarse) pitch, feather the fan, or even reverse the fan pitch in flight (with the fan providing reverse thrust in lieu of conventional reversers).

== Development ==
=== Flying testbeds ===
Turbomeca owned two Rockwell Turbo Commander aircraft, and arranged for Miles Aircraft to modify each of them to accept two podded Astafan engines inboard of the nacelles. The nacelles were stripped of their turboshaft engines, and converted to carry extra fuel. One of the Turbo Commanders, a model 680V-TU, originally bore the experimental registry F-WSTM, and was later redesignated F-BSTM. The other Turbo Commander, F-BXAS, was either a 690A or B model.

== Variants ==
=== Astafan I ===
First run as a prototype in 1969, and first flown in 1971, the Astafan I was derived from the core of the Astazou XIV turboshaft. It was capable of outputting 6.072 kN (1365 lbf) of dry thrust at takeoff power, or 6.517 kN (1465 lbf) of thrust with water-methanol injection.

=== Astafan II ===
The Astafan II line was based on the Astazou XVI turboshaft engine core with a cooled turbine, and was governed to operate at 43000 rev/min.

==== Astafan II ====
The basic Astafan II received its French certification in August 1972. Early Astafan IIs were rated for approximately 6.984 kN (1570 lbf) dry thrust at takeoff power, or 7.495 kN (1685 lbf) with water-methanol injection.

==== Astafan IIA ====
The Astafan IIA was certified in 1972. It differed from the earlier Astafan II by incorporating a new, larger-diameter fan with blades that had a greater range of motion (improving upon the marginal reverse thrust capability that existed in prior versions). Thrust output of the IIA was 6.850 kN (1540 lbf).

==== Astafan IIB4 ====
Two IIB4s were installed on F-BSTM (c. 1978) and used for testing and demonstration flights. This version was rated at 7.561 kN (1700 lbf) of thrust.

==== Astafan IIG ====
The IIG was installed on the prototype of Aérospatiale's Fouga 90 jet trainer (a development of the Fouga Magister). Using this medium-bypass version of the Astafan instead of the Turbomeca Marboré, the 90 had twice the range of the Magister (with a similar fuel load). Installed in the Fouga 90, and operating at its maximum thrust of 6.864 kN (1,543 lbf), the IIG's specific fuel consumption was 11 g/(s·kN) (0.38 lb/(h·lbf)). At 6,000 m (20,000 ft) altitude and Mach 0.5, specific fuel consumption was 20 g/(s·kN) (0.7 lb/(h·lbf<)).

The IIG included the Astafan's characteristic variable-pitch fan, installed in front of an Astazou XVI core (comprising two axial compressor stages preceding a centrifugal compressor on a common shaft). The design also included an annular reverse-flow combustor and a three-stage turbine section. The resulting configuration yielded a bypass ratio of 8.8 and a pressure ratio of 9.1.

=== Astafan III ===
The Astafan III used the Astazou XVI core and a cooled turbine. The dry thrust rating at takeoff was 7.829 kN (1,760 lbf), and with water-methanol injection, thrust rose to 8.429 kN (1895 lbf).

=== Astafan IV ===
The Astafan IV was based upon the Astazou XX turboshaft's core, and used three axial compressor stages before the Astazou-derived centrifugal compressor. Like the Astafan II, the IV was governed at 43000 rev/min. The Astafan IV was considered for installation in the Fouga 90, as a more powerful alternative to the IIG.

==== Astafan IVF6 ====
The IVF6 was tested on F-BXAS, and the engines were retained c. 1987 during that aircraft's time as a company transport. This version of the engine output 10.490 kN (2,358 lbf) of thrust at takeoff power.

== Applications ==
=== Constructed ===
The Astafan was flown as a developmental engine on two aircraft types:

- Rockwell Turbo Commander testbeds (several configurations)
- Fouga 90 (Astafan IIG; prototype built and flown)

=== Proposed ===
Despite its many developmental variants, the Astafan was never produced in commercial quantities. Proposed installations included:

- Ted Smith Super Star 3000 (Astafan II, concept abandoned when Aerostar was sold to Piper Aircraft)
- Italair F.22 Jet Condor (Astafan II)
- Fabrica Militar de Aviones IA 58 Pucará (Astafan IIs to replace turboprop engines)

== Specifications (Astafan IV) ==
Data from Turbomeca's Astafan - Flight International 20 April 72

==== General characteristics ====
- Type: High-bypass turbofan
- Length: 2,056 mm (80.9 in)
- Diameter: 665 mm (26.2 in) fan cowl
- Dry weight: 215 kg (474 lb)

==== Components ====
- Compressor: Single-stage, geared, variable pitch fan followed by three axial stages, supercharging a single-stage centrifugal
- Combustors: Annular chamber
- Turbine: Three-stage axial
- Fuel type: Aviation kerosene
- Oil system: Pressure feed / spray

==== Performance ====
- Maximum thrust: 10 kN (2,200 lbf) dry; 10.7 kN (2,400 lbf) water methanol injection
- Fuel consumption: 367.4 kg/h (810 lb/h)
- Specific fuel consumption: 10.197 g/ s kN (0.36lb/h lbf) dry & water methanol injection SLS, ISA
- Thrust-to-weight ratio: 4.76 dry

== See also ==
- Geared turbofan

Related development

- Turbomeca Astazou
- Turbomeca Aspin

Comparable engines

- Honeywell ALF 502/LF 507
- Pratt & Whitney PW1000G
- Garrett TFE731
- IAE SuperFan

Related lists

- List of aircraft engines
