= Lycoming ALF 502 =

High-bypass turbofan aircraft engine

ALF 502/LF 507
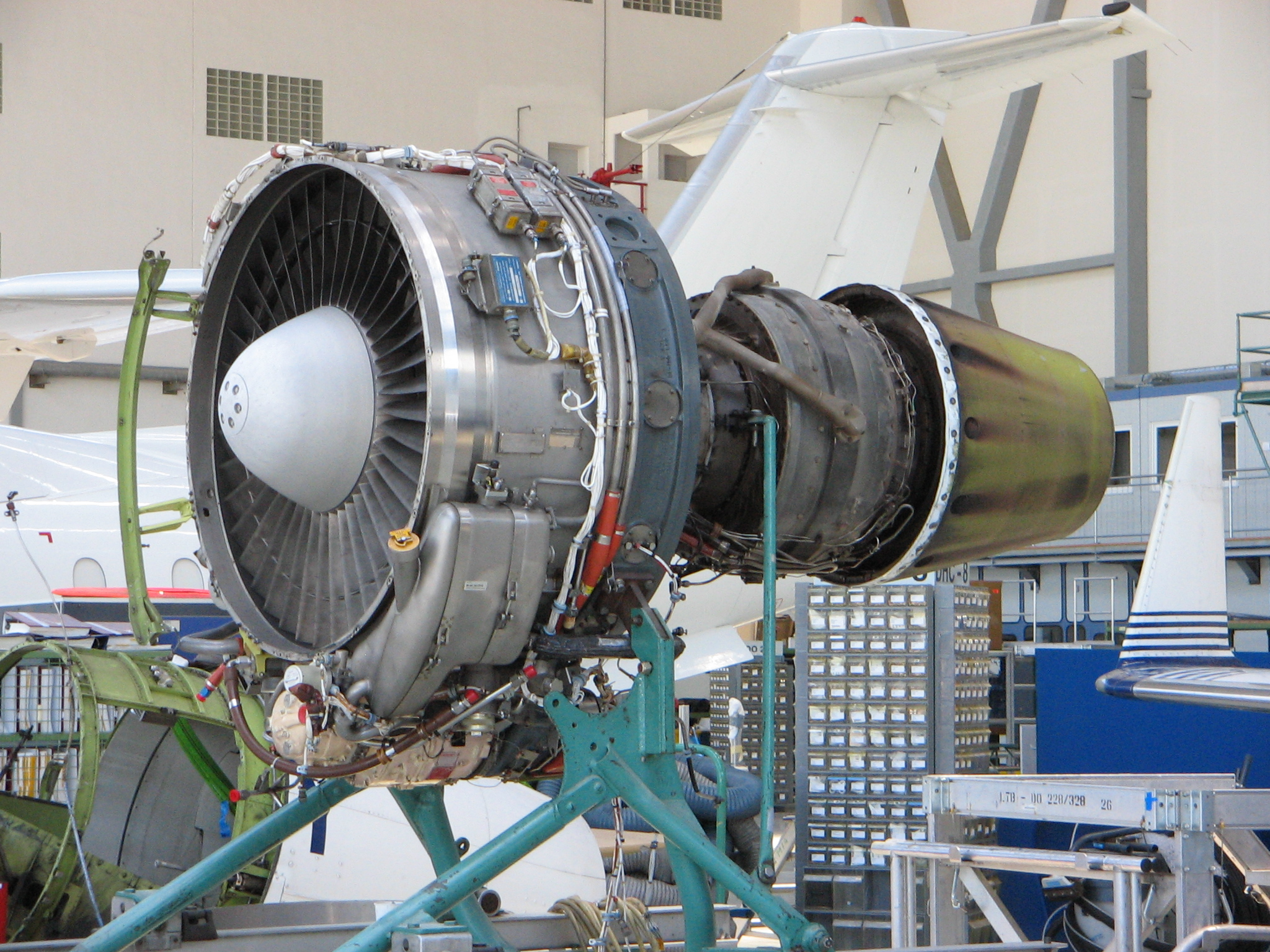
- ALF 502 removed from a Bombardier Challenger 600-1A11
- Type: Geared turbofan
- National origin: United States
- Manufacturer: Lycoming; AlliedSignal; Honeywell Aerospace
- First run: June 1971
- Major applications: Bombardier Challenger 600; British Aerospace 146; Northrop YA-9
- Number built: 1,843
- Developed from: Lycoming T55

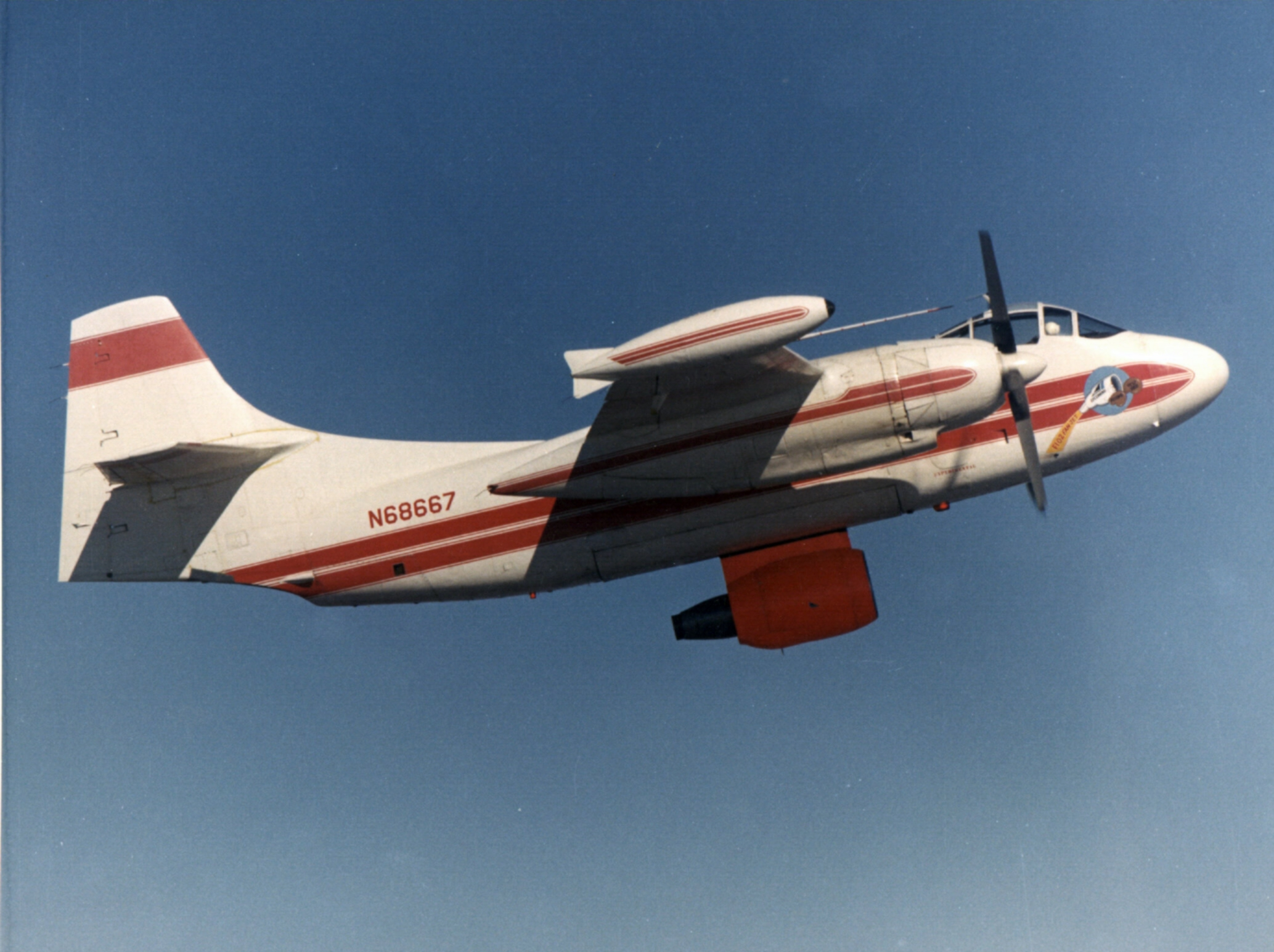
The YF102-LD-100 was tested on an AJ Savage in the early 1970s.

The Lycoming ALF 502/LF 507 (later Honeywell ALF 502/LF 507) is a geared turbofan engine produced by Lycoming Engines, AlliedSignal, and Honeywell Aerospace. The U.S. military designation for the ALF 502 is YF102.

== Development ==
In mid-1970, Avco Lycoming was advertising two Lycoming T55-derived engines, an LTC4B-12 turboprop and an ALF 502A turbofan, as possible powerplants for the U.S. Air Force's A-X close air support aircraft program. Northrop Corporation signed a contract with Avco Lycoming to use the ALF 502A for its entry into the A-X competition, the Northrop YA-9, in January 1971. The engine was given a United States military aircraft engine designation of YF102-LD-100. Six YF102 engines were built for the YA-9. The 7,500 lbf (33 kN) thrust engines powered the A-9A prototypes for seven months of flight tests in 1972, recording 238 flights and 652 flight hours. These engines were later reused in the C-8A Quiet Short-Haul Research Aircraft (QSRA).

The commercial ALF 502D engine was developed from the military YF102 in 1971. Its 6,500 lbf (29 kN) derated engine had just one booster compressor stage instead of the YF102's two stages, and operated under a lower turbine temperature to improve reliability. The ALF 502D powered the Dassault Falcon 30 prototype from May 1973 into 1975, logging 270 flight hours until Dassault discontinued development of the aircraft model. The ALF 502D was also chosen for the LearStar 600 executive transport aircraft, which eventually became the Canadair CL-600 Challenger. The CL-600 Challenger first flew in November 1978 and was powered by the 7,500 lbf (33 kN) ALF 502L-2, ALF 502L-2A, and ALF 502L-3 variants. The 6,700 lbf (30 kN) ALF 502R-3 variant initially powered the quad-engine British Aerospace 146, which entered service in 1983 and became the ALF 502's biggest customer. A total of 1,019 ALF 502 engines of all variants were produced. The LF 507 series based on the ALF 502R was announced in September 1988. The series initially consisted of the hydromechanically controlled LF 507-1H and the FADEC-controlled LF 507-1F, both offering 7,000 lbf (31 kN) of thrust. Both variants were used on the Avro RJ update of the BAe 146, and the LF 507-1F was also used on the BAe 146. 818 LF 507 engines were produced.

In 2020, Honeywell sold the type certificate to CFS Aeroproducts Inc. (Arizona), a subsidiary of MRO provider CFS Aeroproducts Ltd (UK), then transferred in January 2021.

=== Proposed variants ===
In 1972, Lycoming and NASA published a study describing the ALF504, a 12.5 bypass ratio engine producing 8,370 lbf (3,800 kgf; 37.2 kN) of sea-level thrust at a specific fuel consumption of 0.302 lb/(lbf⋅h) (8.6 g/(kN⋅s)) and a fan tip diameter of 48.0 in (1,220 mm).

Lycoming announced its LF500 family of turbofans in September 1988, starting with the LF507-1H and LF507-1F, which were certificated in October 1991 and March 1992, respectively. In June 1992, the company outlined improvements to the LF500 family's core, which included a wide-chord fan to move more air, uprated fan gearbox, three-stage power turbine (an increase from two stages), more lighter-weight composite materials, increased diameter in the first three stages of the axial compressor to increase airflow by 17 percent, an improved impeller (centrifugal compressor) with lean-back vanes, a 16-lobe forced exhaust mixer to reduce noise and specific fuel consumption (SFC), an advanced combustor, and a temperature margin increase of 248 °F (120 °C) in the turbine. Lycoming introduced the 500 Series of common core engines of turboprops and turbofans in February 1994 as a derivative of the LF507 to power regional aircraft in the late 1990s. A turboprop version also was planned for the European Future Large Aircraft military transport (which would eventually become the Airbus A400M). AlliedSignal, which took over Lycoming in October 1994, demonstration tested the common core in December; the core was capable of producing 20,000 lbf (89 kN) of thrust. After losing the competition to power the de Havilland Dash 8-400 regional turboprop, AlliedSignal abandoned the common core effort in July 1995.

== Design ==
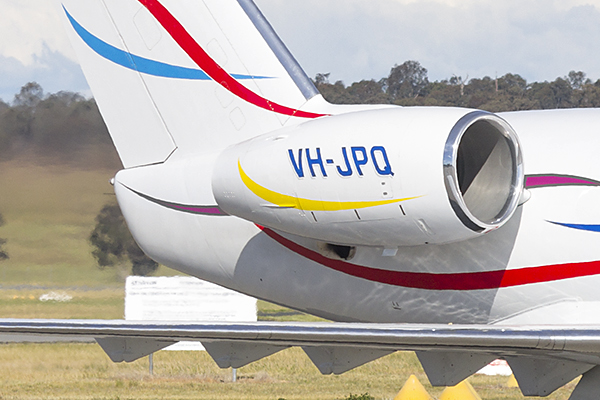
Honeywell ALF 502 on an early Challenger 600

The ALF502 is a high bypass turbofan with geared fan, axial-centrifugal flow high pressure compressor, reverse flow annular combustor, two-stage high pressure turbine, two-stage low pressure turbine.

== Variants ==
ALF502R-3 (single-stage LP compressor)

- ALF502R-4: R-3 with higher thrust
- ALF502R-5: R-4 with improved first-stage and second-stage turbine nozzle assemblies
- ALF502R-3A: R-3 with gas producer turbine improvements, but operated at higher thrust

ALF502L (two-stage LP compressor)

- ALF502L-2: L with fan blade modification for increased altitude performance
- ALF502L-3: L-2 with turbine improvements and automatic power reserve features
- ALF502L-2A: L-2 with gas producer turbine improvements and automatic power reserve features
- ALF502L-2C: L-2A without automatic power reserve
- ALF502R-6: L-2C with R-5 accessory gearbox
- LF507-1H: R-6 with lower, flat-rated thrust
- LF507-1F: 507-1H with a single-channel FADEC with hydromechanical backup

=== Proposed Common Core engines ===
(LF500 family/Lycoming 500 Series/AlliedSignal AS800)

- LF508B2: A 7,900 lbf thrust (35 kN) engine offered for the quad-turbofan powered, 120-seat British Aerospace Regional JetLiner (formerly BAe 146) in 1992
- LF509: A 9,000 lbf thrust (40 kN) turbofan engine for the Avro RJ100
- LF511D: An 11,000 lbf thrust (49 kN) turbofan with a 43 in diameter (1.09 m) wide-chord fan, a three-stage power turbine, and a three-stage low-pressure booster compressor
- LF512 / LF514: Additional turbofan engines of 12,000–14,000 lbf (53–62 kN) thrust, possibly for Avro's proposed 120-seat RJX twin airliner or for a stretched version of the 50-seat Canadair Regional Jet
- LF518: An 18,000 lbf (80 kN) turbofan variant.
- LP512: Turboprop engines targeted for the de Havilland Dash 8-400 and the proposed ATR 82, having an initial power output of 7,500 shp (5,600 kW) but with uprate capability to 11,000 shp (8,200 kW)

== Applications ==
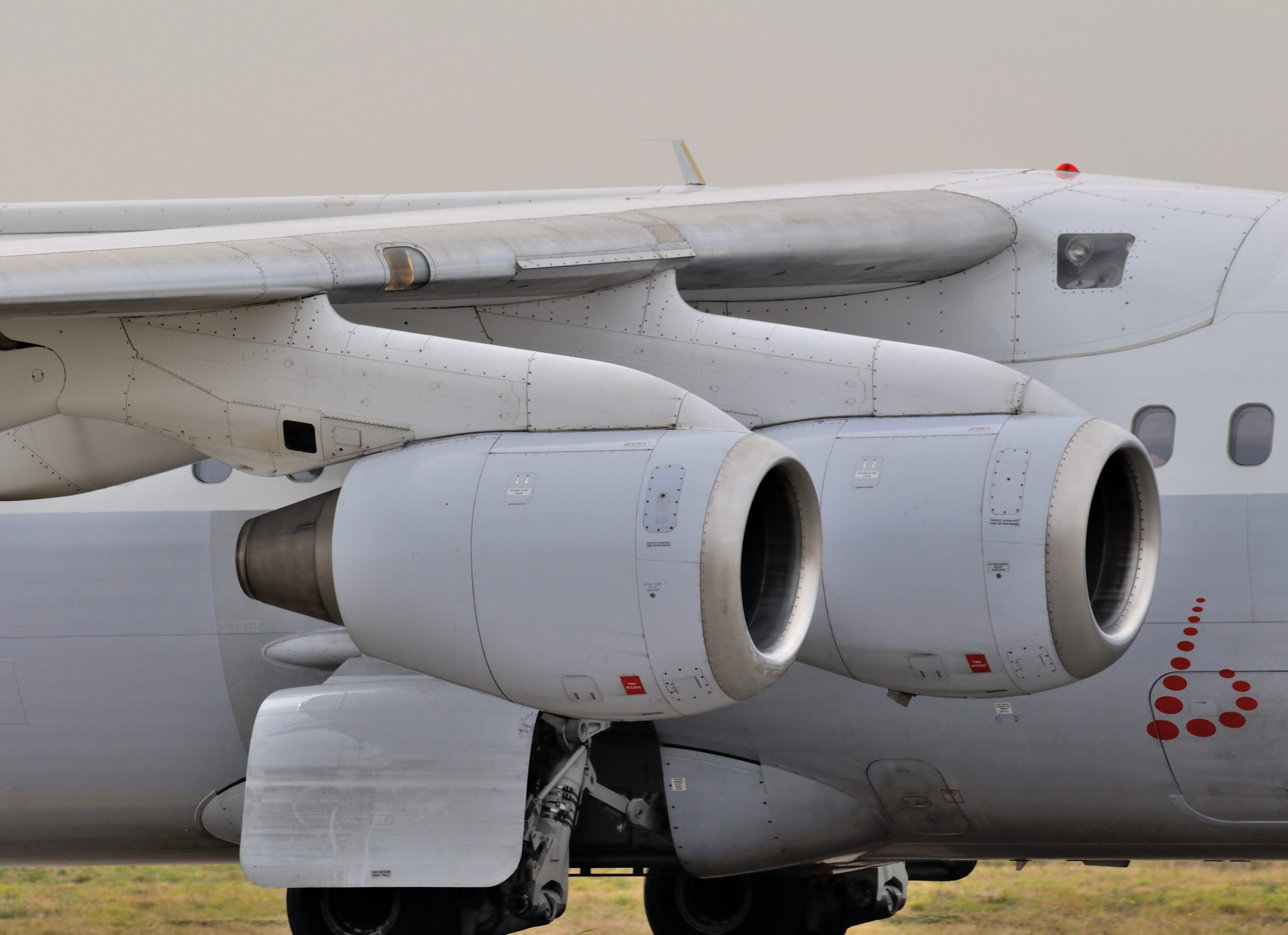
Lycoming LF 507s on a Brussels Airlines British Aerospace 146.

YF102

- Northrop YA-9
- C-8A Quiet Short-Haul Research Aircraft

ALF 502

- Bombardier Challenger 600: early CL-600 (1A11) series, 81 built from 1978 to 1982
- British Aerospace 146
- Dassault Falcon 30 (prototype)

LF 507

- Avro RJ
- British Aerospace 146
- Yakovlev Yak-40TL (proposed reengine)

== Specifications ==
Type Certificate Data Sheet
Variant	ALF502R-3	ALF502R-4/5/3A	ALF502L/L-2/L-3/L-2A/L-2C/R-6	LF507-1H/1F
Configuration	High bypass, geared fan			
Fan diameter	40.25 in (1,022 mm)			
Gear ratio	2.3:1			
Bypass ratio	5.7:1			
Compressor	1 LP, 7-stage axial + centrifugal HP		2 LP, 7-stage axial + centrifugal HP	
Combustor	Reverse flow annular			
Turbine	Two-stage HP, two-stage LP			
Takeoff thrust	6,700 lbf (30 kN)	6,970 lbf (31.0 kN)	7,500 lbf (33 kN)	7,000 lbf (31 kN)
Length	63.66 in (1,617 mm)		65.57 in (1,665 mm)	
Height	55.5 in (1,410 mm)		54.5 in (1,380 mm)	
Width	47.8 in (1,210 mm)		48.6 in (1,230 mm)	
Weight (Note: includes essential engine accessories but excludes starter, hydraulic pump, integrated drive generator and exhaust nozzle)	1,336 lb (606 kg)		1,375 lb (624 kg) (1F: 1,385 lb (628 kg))	
LP rpm	7,184 - 7,374			
HP rpm	19,280 - 19,760			
TSFC (SLS ISA)	0.406 lb/(lbf⋅h) (11.5 g/(kN⋅s))			
Thrust/weight	5.01	5.22	5.45	5.09

== See also ==
Related development

- Lycoming T55
- Honeywell HTF7000 (AS907), ALF502/LF507 successor

Comparable engines

- GE CF34
- Pratt & Whitney Canada PW300
- Rolls-Royce AE 3007

Geared turbofans

- Garrett TFE731
- Turbomeca Aspin/Astafan
- Rolls-Royce/SNECMA M45SD

Related lists

- List of aircraft engines
