= BAC/Dassault AFVG =

1960s project for combat aircraft with a variable-sweep wing

AFVG
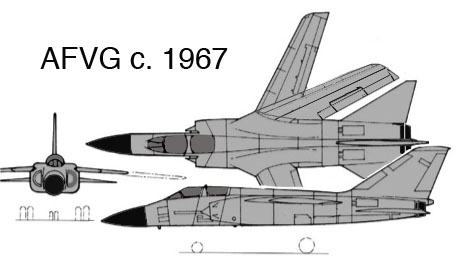
- Artist's concept

General information
- Type: Interceptor aircraft, tactical strike, reconnaissance aircraft
- National origin: United Kingdom/France
- Manufacturer: British Aircraft Corporation/Dassault Aviation
- Status: Cancelled
- Number built: None

BAC/Dassault AFVG (standing for Anglo-French Variable Geometry) was a 1960s project for supersonic multi-role combat aircraft with a variable-sweep wing, (Note: The term in use at the time was variable-geometry.) jointly developed by British Aircraft Corporation in the United Kingdom and Dassault Aviation of France.

The project was borne out of ambitions to produce a viable combat aircraft that made use of the variable-sweep wing, as well as to promote wider cooperative efforts between France and the United Kingdom. However, neither Dassault nor the French Air Force were particularly keen on the AFVG; the project was further impacted by repeated specification changes and indecision for what roles that the AFVG was to be tasked with on the part of Britain. In mid-1967, British requirements settled upon adopting the AFVG for the Royal Air Force (RAF) for the strike role in the place of the cancelled BAC TSR-2 strike bomber.

The project was cancelled in June 1967, when the French Government withdrew from participation. BAC modified the specification to solely satisfy RAF needs, reconfiguring the design as the UKVG and sought out new partners to procure the aircraft. This ultimately emerged as the Anglo-German-Italian consortium-funded "Multi Role Combat Aircraft" (MRCA), Panavia Tornado, a variable-geometry wing fighter/strike aircraft.

== Development ==
=== Background ===
From 1945 onwards, Britain conducted a number of studies into the properties and use of variable geometry wings. The noted British engineer and inventor Sir Barnes Wallis began exploring the concept during the Second World War and became an early pioneer and advocate for the variable geometry wing, conceiving of an aircraft consideration that lacked conventional features such as a vertical stabiliser and rudder, instead using variable geometry wings to provide primary controllability in their place. In 1946, Wallis published a paper upon this research, which was quickly hailed as being a major scientific breakthrough in the aviation industry. Wallis proceeded to advocate for the production of an aircraft, military or civil, that would take advantage of a variable geometry wing. The Ministry of Supply and Ministry of Defence arranged for a series of tests to demonstrate the application of the technology to projectiles, both for research purposes and a potential form of anti-aircraft defence; while Wallis worked upon this research programme, he continued to promote the concept of a manned variable geometry aircraft.

In 1951, the Ministry of Supply issued Specification ER.110T, which sought a piloted variable geometry aircraft that would be suitable for research flights; however, ER.110T would be cancelled without an order due to urgent demands for more conventional transonic combat aircraft. At one point, Wallis examined the prospects of producing a variable geometry submission for Specification OR.330, which sought a supersonic aerial reconnaissance/strategic bomber aircraft. He conceived of a large aircraft equipped with a moveable delta wing configuration, which he dubbed Swallow; however, midway through scale model free-flight testing, the funding for Wallis' studies was terminated by the Ministry in June 1957. In 1958, research efforts were revived in cooperation with the Mutual Weapons Development Programme of NATO, under which all of Wallis' variable geometry research was shared with the Americans.

During the mid-1950s, multiple British aircraft manufacturers had become interested in harnessing variable geometry wings in their proposed designs. Amongst these design studies were a supersonic-capable derivative of the Folland Gnat, and a project by Vickers to design a large variable geometry strike aircraft in response to Specification GOR.339 for a nuclear-armed supersonic bomber. In 1964, the newly formed British Aircraft Corporation (BAC) decided to harness Vicker's earlier variable geometry work on a new design study, designated as the BAC P.45. The conceptual BAC P.45 was designed as a 'light strike' and two-seat trainer aircraft. BAC had strongly advocated for a government order for the type to equip the Royal Air Force (RAF), being one of a number of proposed designs (Note: The BAC P.45/P.61 joined the Folland Fo.147, Hawker Siddeley P.1173, Hunting H.155 and Vickers 593 as contenders for the AST.362 advanced fighter/trainer requirement.) that were produced by several rival manufacturers to meet Specification AST.362. According to aviation author Derek Wood, in spite the P.45 design being "the obvious choice", the Secretary of State for Defence Denis Healey dismissed it in favour of a prospective cooperative arrangement with France for a joint-project based on the Br.121 ECAT ("Tactical Combat Support Trainer") proposal from Breguet Aviation instead.

=== Anglo-French collaboration ===
Starting in 1964, a series of in-depth discussions took place between the governments of France and UK on prospective collaborative military aviation programs; these involved talks between Handel Davies, the co-chairman of an Anglo-French committee, and his French counterpart, Ingénieur-General Lecamus, negotiating the launch of two new military combat aircraft. According to these negotiations, the French would take the lead role in developing a new light ground-attack/trainer, while the British were to assume the leadership of a multirole fighter project. This multirole aircraft was to be equipped with a variable geometry wing and was intended to perform the strike, reconnaissance, and interceptor roles.

On 17 May 1965, following on from the cancellation of the BAC TSR-2 supersonic tactical and strike bomber, the British and French governments announced the signing of a pair of agreements to cover the two joint projects; one based on the Breguet Aviation Br.121 ECAT ("Tactical Combat Support Trainer") proposal; this would later evolve, after the cancellation of the AFVG, to become the SEPECAT Jaguar. The other was the AFVG, a larger, variable geometry carrier-capable fighter aircraft for the French Navy (Aéronavale) as well as fulfilling interceptor, tactical strike and reconnaissance roles for the RAF. The AFVG was to be jointly developed by BAC and Dassault Aviation, the proposed M45G turbofan engine to power the aircraft was to also be jointly developed by SNECMA and Bristol Siddeley.

=== Design specifications ===
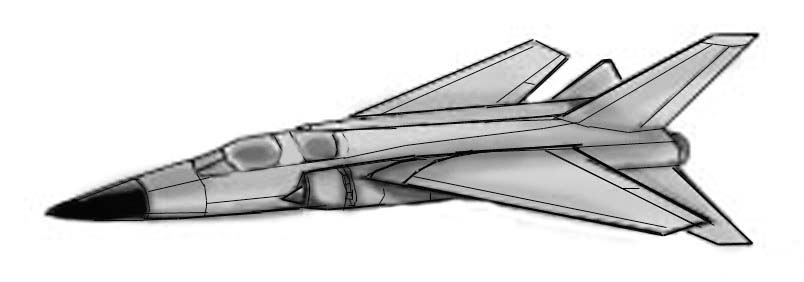
Early design of the AFVG.

On 13 July 1965, the specification for the AFVG feasibility study was issued; according to Wood, the specification greatly resembled that which had been earlier issued for the cancelled TSR-2. The AFVG was to have a maximum speed of 800 knots at sea level and Mach 2.5 at altitude. It was required to possess a minimum combat radius of 500 nautical miles, a ferry range of 3,500 nautical miles, and the nose-mounted aircraft interception radar was to have a minimum range of 60 nautical miles. Armament was to include a pair of 30 mm cannons and a 2,500 lb tactical nuclear bomb. However, the specification would be repeatedly re-drafted, the issuing of a definitive specification by Whitehall was delayed until April 1966.

Wood observed that the requirements of the specification were of a multi-role nature, akin to the Hawker Siddeley P.1154 and variable geometry General Dynamics F-111K. In RAF service, the AFVG had originally been intended to serve as a fighter, replacing the English Electric Lightning in the interceptor mission. However, following the decision to procure the American-built McDonnell Douglas F-4 Phantom II instead, the AFVG's expected role was changed in 1966 to supplementing the F-111K (Note: Another variable-geometry (VG) design from the US replacing the cancelled TSR-2.) strike aircraft in replacing the English Electric Canberra and the V bomber force.

The AFVG was to be powered by a pair of SNECMA/Bristol Siddeley M45G turbofans, which were to be fed by Mirage-style half-shock cone inlets. The engine development programme contract was to be issued by the French government to a SNECMA/Bristol Siddeley joint venture company registered in France.

=== Cancellation ===
For Marcel Dassault, the founder of the firm that bore his name, relinquishing leadership on a major project, essentially taking a subordinate position to BAC on the AFVG threatened his company's long-term objective of becoming a premier prime contractor for combat aircraft. After less than a year, Dassault began to actively undermine the AFVG project, working on two competing "in-house" projects: the variable geometry Mirage G and the Mirage F1. According to Wood, both Dassault and the French Air Force had been unenthusiastic for the project from the start, the latter wanting to pursue its own indigenous aircraft equipped with variable geometry wings, while the former had determined that the AFVG did not confirm with any of its future equipment plans. While Britain was keen to procure a capable strike aircraft, France wanted interceptor aircraft; these design requirements of these different roles were relatively exclusive of one another.

Britain's own set of requirements for the AFVG were complicated by the effort of trying to fit the requirements of both the RAF and the Royal Navy onto a single airframe. Accordingly, as a measure to achieve reasonable performance, two different versions of the AFVG were called for, one being a multirole fighter equipped with pulse-Doppler radar and air-to-air missiles while the other was to be a strike aircraft with limited capability as an interceptor.

In June 1967, the French government announced their withdrawal from the AFVG project ostensibly on the grounds of cost. (Note: According to aviation publication Flight International, Dassault had gained valuable data on variable-geometry configurations from the AFVG programme and may have used the excuse of cost issues in order to divert funds and data to their own VG projects.) The collapse of the AFVG programme was considerably troubling to the British position, having chosen to rely on Anglo-French collaboration and American-designed combat aircraft to meet its needs.

The unilateral French decision led to a censure debate in the House of Commons. By 1967, when the French decided to withdraw from the AFVG programme, the Air Ministry was faced with a dilemma stemming from the imminent prospect of cancelling the F-111K, a decision that was taken in November 1967, to be formalized on 20 March 1968. Up to this point, Britain had spent £2.5 million on the AFVG for practically no gains. In order to justify the absence of any new strike aircraft following the failure of multiple projects to develop or procure one, Healey decided to entirely dismantle the requirement for one. Thus, in 1968, Prime Minister Harold Wilson, alongside Healey, announced that British troops would be withdrawn in 1971 from major military bases in South East Asia, the Persian Gulf and the Maldives, collectively known as 'East of Suez'.

== Redesign ==
With the prospect of no operational aircraft being available to fulfill the RAF's strike role, BAC decided to revamp the AFVG design, eliminating the carrier capabilities that were no longer necessary, into a larger, more strike-oriented variable geometry aircraft. Holding contracts were issued to BAC to support the project, which had been re-designated as the United Kingdom Variable Geometry (UKVG) aircraft. In November 1967, BAC issued a brochure on the UKVG proposal; various proposals would be issued to cover the use of multiple different engines. The quick production of a demonstrator aircraft, powered by a pair of Rolls-Royce/MAN Turbo RB153 turbofan engines, was also mooted.

While funding for the UKVG in the United Kingdom was seriously restricted, the British government sought to find partners in the form of NATO members, (Note: Belgium, Canada, Italy, the Netherlands and West Germany were approached.) promoting the concept of creating and procuring a common NATO strike aircraft. In July 1968, a memorandum of understanding was signed between Britain, West Germany, Italy, the Netherlands, Belgium, and Canada. This memorandum eventually led to the launch of the multinational Multi-Role Combat Aircraft (MRCA) project, which in turn went on to produce a variable geometry aircraft to perform strike, reconnaissance, and interception missions in the form of the Panavia Tornado.

== Specifications ==
Data from Project Cancelled: The Disaster of Britain's Abandoned Aircraft Projects

General characteristics

- Crew: 2
- Length: 17.43 m (57 ft 2 in)
- Wingspan: 12.98 m (42 ft 7 in) (wings spread)
- Height: 5.39 m (17 ft 8 in)
- Gross weight: 13,608–22,680 kg (30,001–50,001 lb)
- Powerplant: 2 × SNECMA/Bristol Siddeley M45G afterburning turbofan engines

Performance

- Maximum speed: 3,017 km/h (1,875 mph, 1,629 kn)
- Maximum speed: Mach 2.5
- Range: 6,486 km (4,030 mi, 3,502 nmi)
- Service ceiling: 18,290 m (60,010 ft)

Armament

- Guns: 2× 30-millimetre (1.2 in) autocannon
- Bombs: 1,134 kg (2,500 lb) tactical nuclear weapon

Avionics
Ground Mapping Radar + TFR
