= SNECMA M45 =

- Type: Turbojet engine
- National origin: France
- Manufacturer: SNECMA
- Variants: Rolls-Royce/SNECMA M45H

The SNECMA M45, also called the SNECMA Mars, was a turbojet engine designed and produced by SNECMA in France during the late 1950s and early 1960s. The M45 was the precursor to a family of turbojet and turbofan engines, culminating in the collaborative Rolls-Royce/SNECMA M45H, high bypass turbofan engine.

== Variants ==
Data from: Aircraft Engines of the World 1964/65

M45A
A compact moderate thrust turbojet.
M45A-3
for civil applications.
M45AF
Aft-fan turbofan engine intended for civil aircraft.
M45B
Turbojet with afterburning for military aircraft.
M45B-3
With afterburner.
M45F-3
Civil non-afterburning for small airliners / business jets.
M45L-1
Lightweight civil version for small business jets.
SNECMA/Bristol Siddeley M45G
Afterburning turbofan engine for AFVG, from the civil M45F.

== Specifications (M45A) ==
Data from Aircraft Engines of the World 1964/65

==== General characteristics ====
- Type: 2-spool turbojet engine
- Length: 1,620 mm (63.8 in)
- Diameter: 550 mm (21.7 in)
- Dry weight:

==== Components ====
- Compressor:
- Combustors: annular combustion chamber

==== Performance ====
- Maximum thrust: 19.57 kN (4,400 lbf)
- Overall pressure ratio: 16:1

== See also ==
Related development

- Rolls-Royce/SNECMA M45H

Related lists

- List of aircraft engines
