= Northrop YA-9 =

Prototype attack aircraft developed for the US Air Force A-X program

YA-9
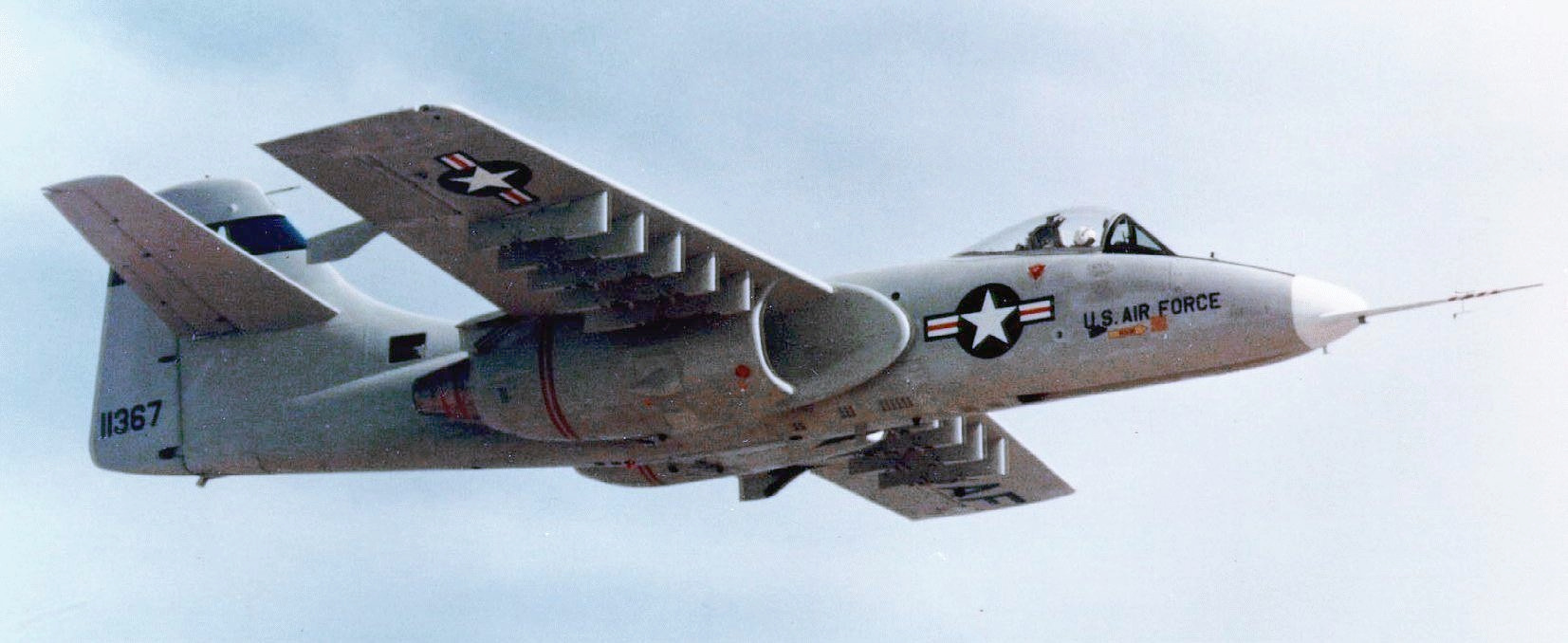

General information
- Type: Attack aircraft
- Manufacturer: Northrop Corporation
- Status: Cancelled
- Primary users: United States Air Force NASA
- Number built: 2

History
- First flight: 30 May 1972

The Northrop YA-9 is a prototype attack aircraft developed for the United States Air Force A-X program. The YA-9 was passed over in preference for the Fairchild Republic YA-10 that entered production as the A-10 Thunderbolt II.

== Design and development ==
Criticism that the U.S. Air Force did not take close air support seriously prompted a few service members to seek a specialized attack aircraft. In the Vietnam War, large numbers of ground-attack aircraft were shot down by small arms, surface-to-air missiles, and low-level anti-aircraft gunfire, prompting the development of an aircraft better able to survive such weapons. Fast jets such as the North American F-100 Super Sabre, Republic F-105 Thunderchief, and McDonnell Douglas F-4 Phantom II proved for the most part to be ineffective for close air support. The Douglas A-1 Skyraider was the USAF's primary close air support aircraft.

=== A-X ===
In mid-1966, the U.S. Air Force formed the Attack Experimental (A-X) program office. On 6 March 1967, the Air Force released a request for information to 21 defense contractors for the A-X. The objective was to create a design study for a low-cost attack aircraft. Discussions with A-1 Skyraider pilots operating in Vietnam and analysis of the effectiveness of current aircraft used in the role indicated the ideal aircraft should have long loiter time, low-speed maneuverability, massive cannon firepower, and extreme survivability; an aircraft that had the best elements of the Ilyushin Il-2, Henschel Hs 129 and Skyraider. While turboprop engines were requested in the initial request, by May 1969, requirements had changed to specify use of turbofan engines.

In May 1970, the USAF issued a modified, and much more detailed request for proposals (RFP). The threat of Soviet armored forces and all-weather attack operations had become more serious. Now included in the requirements was that the aircraft would be designed specifically for the 30 mm cannon. The RFP also called for an aircraft with a maximum speed of 460 mph (740 km/h), takeoff distance of 4,000 feet (1,200 m), external load of 16,000 pounds (7,300 kg), 285-mile (460 km) mission radius, and a unit cost of US$1.4 million. Simplicity and low cost were also vital requirements, with a maximum flyaway cost of $1.4 million based on a 600 aircraft production run. Performance was to be sacrificed where necessary to keep development and production costs under control. During this time, a separate RFP was released for A-X's 30 mm cannon with requirements for a high rate of fire (4,000 round/minute) and a high muzzle velocity. Six companies submitted proposals to the USAF, with Northrop and Fairchild Republic selected on 18 December 1970 to build prototypes: the YA-9A and YA-10A, respectively. Meanwhile, General Electric and Philco-Ford were selected to build and test GAU-8 cannon prototypes.

=== Design ===
The A-9 was a shoulder-wing monoplane of all-riveted aluminum alloy construction, with honeycomb structures and chemically milled skins. The required twin turbofans were fitted in nacelles under the aircraft's wing roots. (Note: By comparison, the A-10 engine location at the tail is less conventional, but offers greater survivability in the case of a hit on the engine area. The double tail of the A-10 also hides the engine infrared and noise signature, and incorporates redundancy in case one of the tails is shot away.) Northrop selected the 7,200 lbf (32 kN) Lycoming YF102 engine for the YA-9 rather than the more powerful (9,280 lbf (41.3 kN)) General Electric TF34 used by the A-10, although either engine could be accommodated. The YF102 engine was a new design, based on the Avco Lycoming T55 turboshaft that powered the Boeing CH-47 Chinook helicopter, which was selected in order to minimize costs. The aircraft had a large cruciform stabilizer in order to improve directional stability for low-level flight. Split ailerons were fitted that could be used as airbrakes. When these airbrakes were operated asymmetrically in conjunction with the aircraft's rudder, sideways control forces could be applied (and the aircraft moved sideways) without yawing or banking, easing weapon aiming.

The pilot sat under a large bubble canopy well ahead of the leading edge of the wings. The cockpit was surrounded by a bathtub of armor (aluminum in the prototypes, which would have been replaced by titanium if production occurred) while the wing-mounted fuel tanks were self-sealing and filled with foam to minimize the potential for fires or massive fuel loss. Dual redundant hydraulic flight control systems were fitted, with a further manual backup to prevent a single hit from causing control failure. These design features were hoped to reduce combat losses by as much as 90% in Vietnam-type operations. A single 30 mm rotary cannon was to be fitted in the belly of the aircraft, with the gun barrels extending under the nose. As the gun was mounted on the aircraft's centerline, the undercarriage nosewheel was offset one foot (0.30 m) to the left. As the GAU-8 Avenger cannon was not ready, both YA-9 prototypes (and the two YA-10s) were fitted with the smaller 20 mm M61 Vulcan instead. Ten underwing hardpoints were fitted, allowing up to 16,000 lb (7,300 kg) of weapons, including bombs and AGM-65 Maverick air-to-ground missiles, to be carried.

=== Fly-off ===
The YA-9 took its first flight on 30 May 1972, with the second prototype flying on 23 August. Northrop's flight testing was successful, with the aircraft claimed to have "fighter-like" handling and to be a good weapon platform. A fly-off by USAF test pilots of the two competing designs took place between 10 October and 9 December 1972. While the YA-9 fully met the USAF's requirements, the YA-10 was declared the winner on 18 January 1973. The use of the established TF34 engine by the YA-10 rather than the untried F102 may have been preferred by the Air Force, while Fairchild had no alternative work available and was unlikely to survive if it did not win the A-X contract.

The two YA-9 prototypes were subsequently relegated to NASA for continued flight testing before being retired. When retired, the YA-9s' custom-built engines were removed and were later mated to a C-8 Buffalo airframe as part of the NASA-Boeing joint Quiet Short-haul Research Aircraft (QSRA) study into a quiet short-haul commercial aircraft.

== Aircraft disposition ==
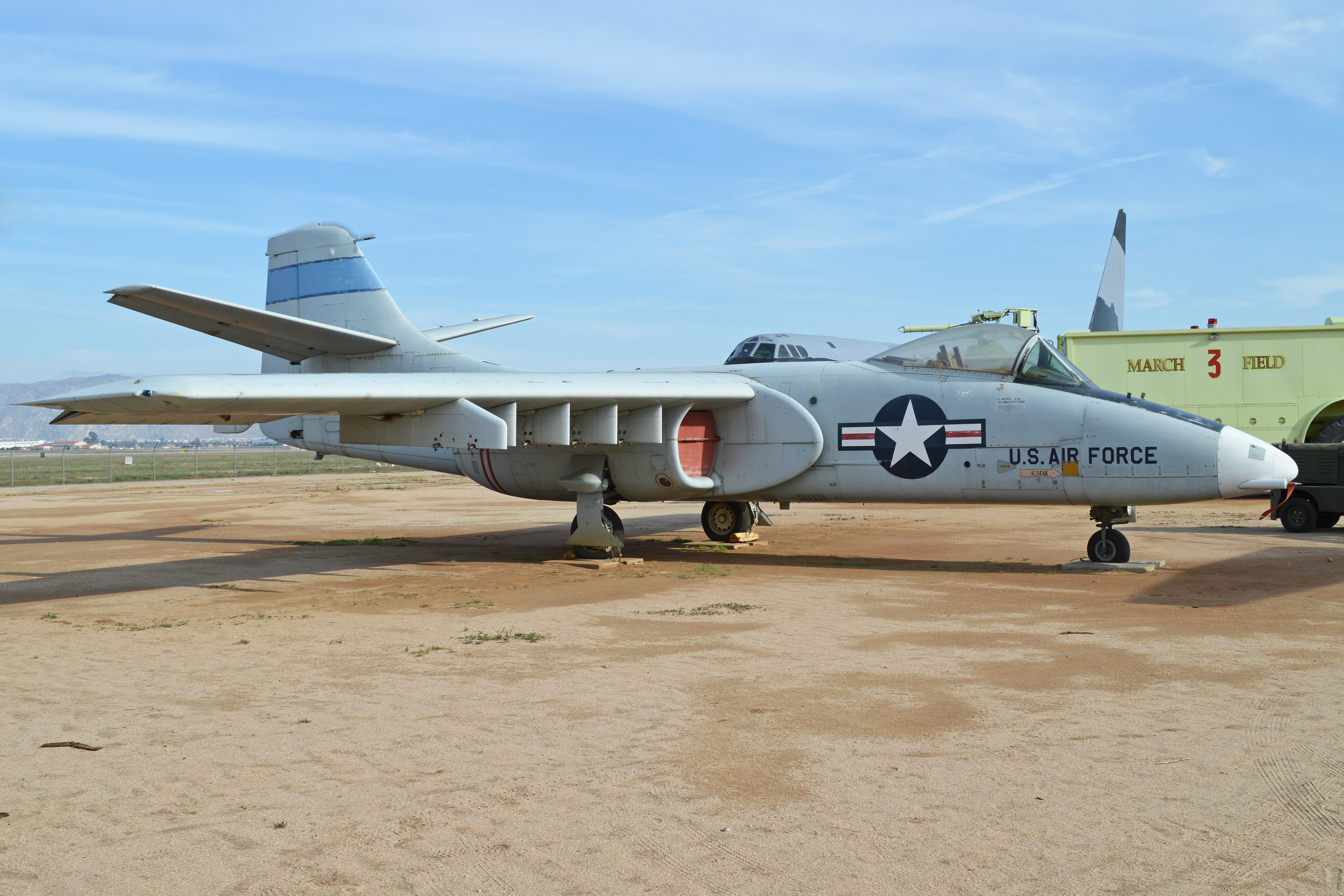
Northrop YA-9A display at the March Field Air Museum, Riverside, California

- 71-1367 - storage yard awaiting restoration at Edwards AFB, California.
- 71-1368 - on display at March Field Air Museum, March Air Reserve Base, California.

== Specifications (YA-9A) ==
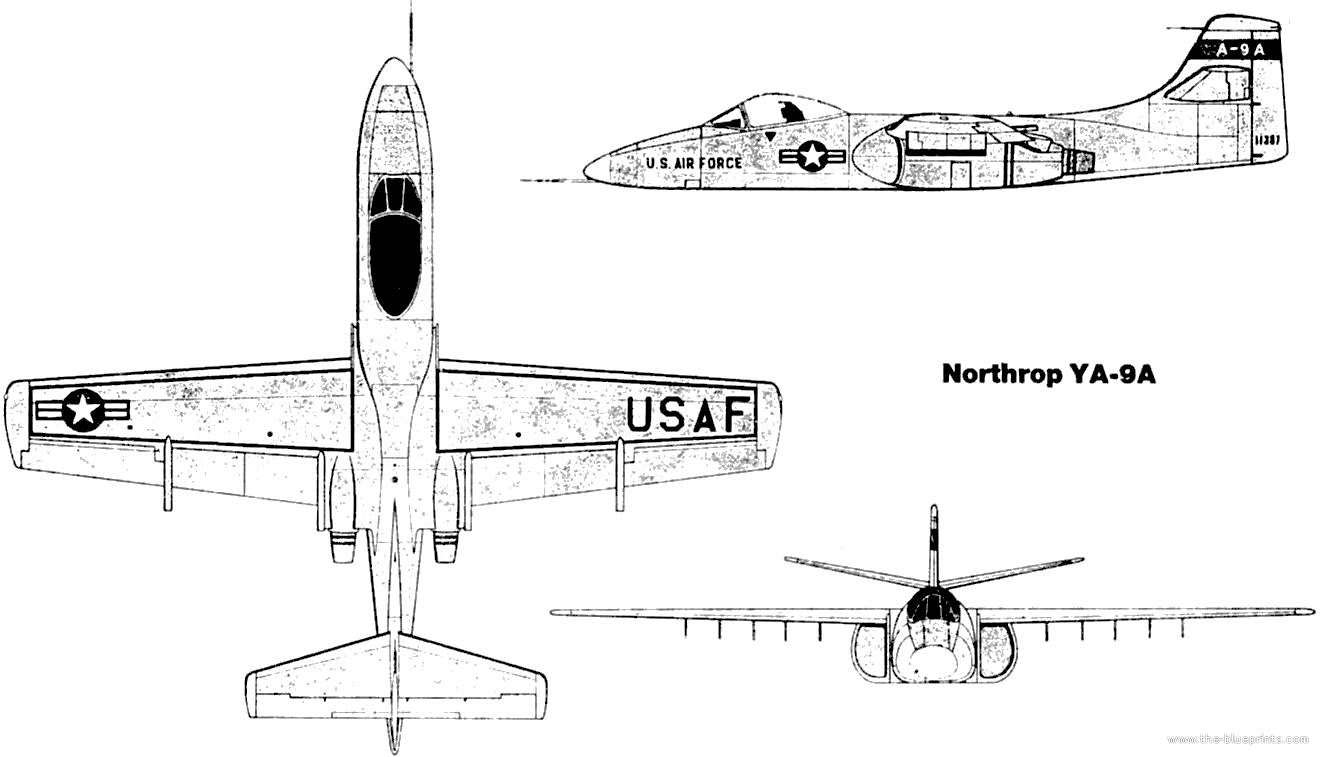
3-view line drawing of the Northrop YA-9

Data from Airdata File: Northrop A-9A

General characteristics

- Crew: 1
- Length: 53 ft 6 in (16.31 m)
- Wingspan: 58 ft 0 in (17.68 m)
- Height: 16 ft 11 in (5.16 m)
- Wing area: 580 sq ft (54 m^{2})
- Gross weight: 25,000 lb (11,340 kg)
- Max takeoff weight: 41,000 lb (18,597 kg)
- Powerplant: 2 × Lycoming YF102-LD-100 turbofan engines, 7,200 lbf (32 kN) thrust each

Performance

- Maximum speed: 452 kn (520 mph, 837 km/h)
- Rate of climb: 5,000 ft/min (25 m/s)

Armament

- Guns: 1x 20 mm M61 Vulcan Gatling gun (Substitute for GAU-8/A)
- Hardpoints: 10 underwing with a capacity of 16,000 lb (7,300 kg)

== See also ==
Aircraft of comparable role, configuration, and era

- Fairchild Republic A-10 Thunderbolt II
- Ilyushin Il-102
- Sukhoi Su-25

Related lists

- List of attack aircraft
- List of military aircraft of the United States
