= Geared turbofan =

Turbofan engine with a gearbox used to drive its fan

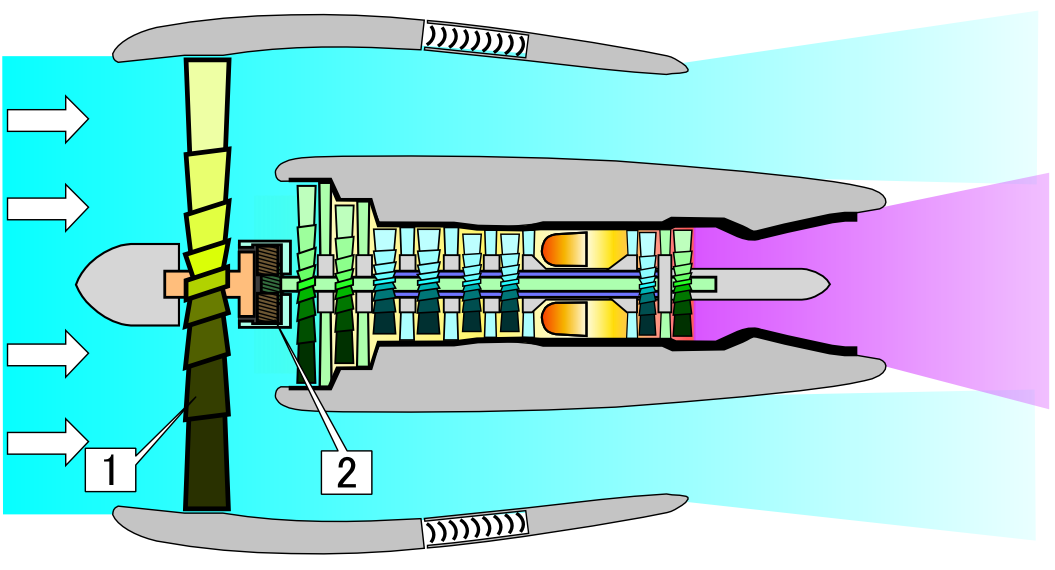
- Diagram of a two-spool, geared turbofan, with a 2-stage low-pressure compressor, 4-stage high-pressure compressor, and single-stage high pressure and low pressure turbines. [1]: Fan. [2]: Gearbox.

The geared turbofan is a type of turbofan aircraft engine with a planetary gearbox between the low pressure compressor / turbine and the ducted fan, enabling each to spin at its optimum speed. The benefit of the design is lower fuel consumption and much quieter operation. The drawback is that it increases weight and adds complexity.

== Technology ==
In a conventional turbofan, a single shaft (the "low-pressure" or LP shaft) connects the fan, the low-pressure compressor and the low-pressure turbine (a second concentric shaft connects the high-pressure compressor and high-pressure turbine). In this configuration, the maximum tip speed for the larger radius fan limits the rotational speed for the LP shaft and thus the LP compressor and turbine. At high bypass ratios (and thus also high radius ratios) the rotational speed of the LP turbine and compressor must be relatively low, which means extra compressor and turbine stages are required to keep the average stage loadings and, therefore, overall component efficiencies to an acceptable level.

In a geared turbofan, a planetary reduction gearbox between the fan and the LP shaft allows the latter to run at a higher rotational speed thus enabling fewer stages to be used in both the LP turbine and the LP compressor, increasing efficiency and reducing weight. However, some energy will be lost as heat in the gear mechanism and weight saved on turbine and compressor stages is partly offset by that of the gearbox. There are manufacturing cost and reliability implications as well.

The lower fan speed allows higher bypass ratios, leading to reduced fuel consumption and much reduced noise. The Pratt & Whitney PW1000G family, the first geared turbofan to enter commercial airline service, uses a planetary fan drive gear system with an approximately 3:1 reduction ratio, enabling bypass ratios above 12:1.The BAe 146 is fitted with geared turbofans and is still one of the quietest commercial aircraft. A large part of the noise reduction is due to reduced fan tip speeds. In conventional turbofans the fan tips exceed the speed of sound causing a characteristic drone, requiring sound deadening. Geared turbofans operate the fan at sufficiently low rotational speed to avoid supersonic tip speeds.

== History ==
Small geared turbofans like the Turbomeca Aspin were developed, tested and flown by 1952. Later, following development work in the 1970s, the Garrett TFE731 and Lycoming ALF 502 would go into production. However, economically scaling the idea from small engines to medium and large ones was not possible until the 21st century.

After considering a geared design, General Electric and Safran decided against it for their CFM LEAP due to weight and reliability concerns, postponing its use for a future application, when Pratt & Whitney began development of the geared PW1000G.

Since its inception in 2016, while the durability of the geared turbofan engine of Pratt & Whitney PW1000G family has been an ongoing issue, no reliability issues are connected to the geared design.

Rolls-Royce's latest engine design for large turbofans (25,000lb to 110,000lb thrust), the UltraFan includes a Powergear rated at a new high of 64MW (87,000hp) and has demonstrated this full power during testing in 2021.

== Use ==
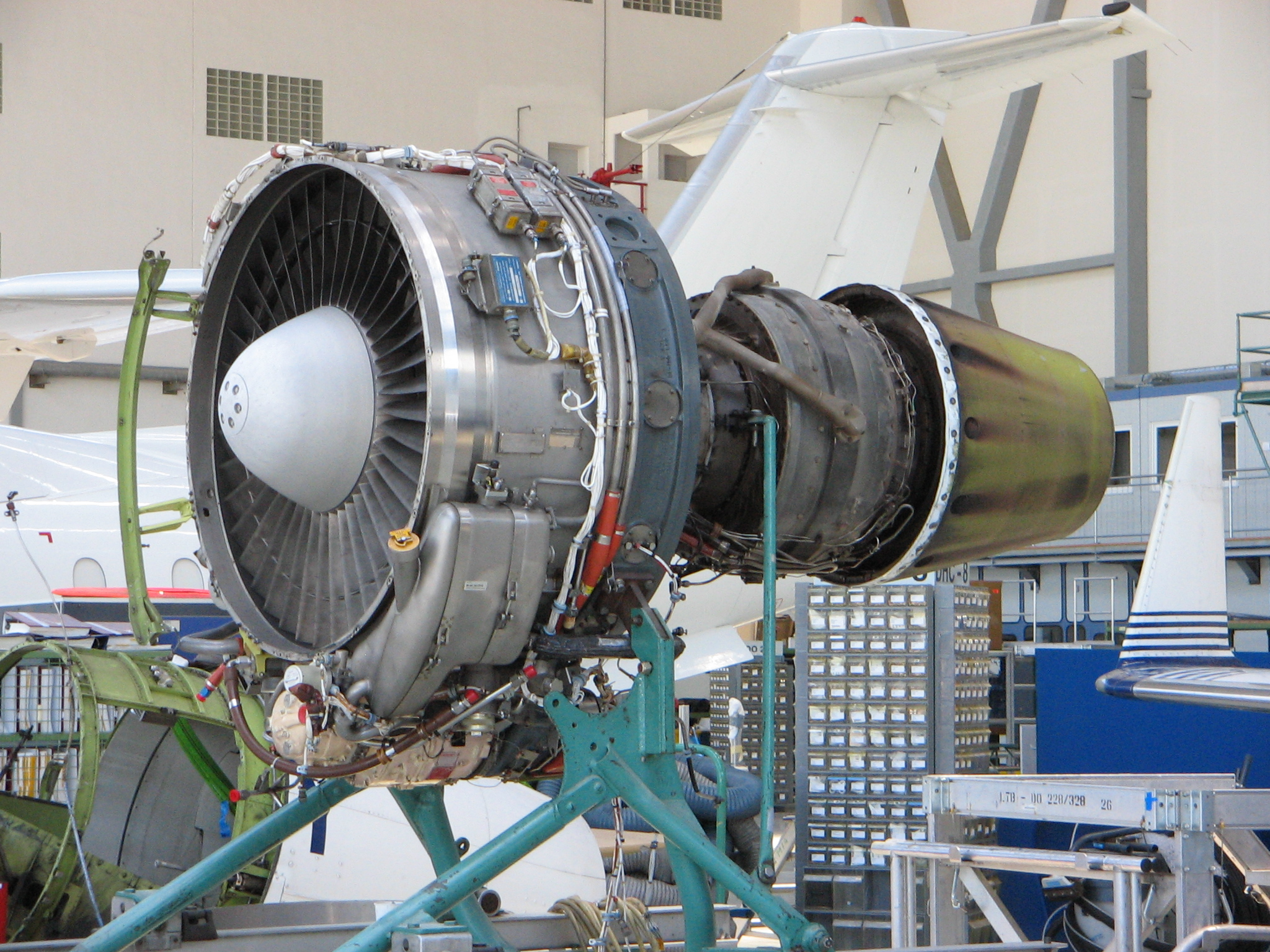
An ALF 502 geared turbofan from a Bombardier Challenger 600

Geared turbofan technology is used in the following engines:

- Garrett TFE731
- Lycoming ALF 502/LF 507
- Pratt & Whitney PW1000G
- Rolls-Royce UltraFan
- Turbomeca Astafan
- Turbomeca Aspin

=== Tentative use ===
- Rolls-Royce/SNECMA M45SD, a derivative of Rolls-Royce/SNECMA M45H turbofan, designed to demonstrate ultra-quiet engine technologies, needed for STOL aircraft operating from city centre airports
- IAE SuperFan, an IAE V2500 derivative proposed for the Airbus A340 between 1987 and 1992
- Aviadvigatel PD-18R, a derivative of the direct drive PD-14, based on its high-temperature core, to be completed by 2020

== See also ==
- Advanced Technology Engine
- Ducted fan
- Propfan

Related lists

- Index of aviation articles
- List of aircraft engines
