= Variable pitch fan =

Variable Pitch Propeller

A variable pitch fan is similar in concept to that of a variable-pitch propeller and involves progressively reducing the pitch (or blade angle) of the fan on a turbofan as the engine is throttled. Although variable pitch fans are used in some industrial applications, the focus of this article is on their use in turbofan engines. No production engine uses such a feature; however, it will likely be required on at least some of the next generation of high bypass ratio turbofans.

One of the methods used to reduce thrust-specific fuel consumption is to improve propulsive efficiency. This involves reducing the effective jet velocity of the engine by reducing specific thrust. This, in turn, reduces the optimum fan pressure ratio required and consequently the cold nozzle pressure ratio. At cruise flight speeds, the nozzle is choked and the fan working line is fairly steep and linear. However, at low flight speeds, the ram pressure rise in the air intake is so low the nozzle is well un-choked. Consequently, the fan working line is highly curved and well to the left of the cruise flight speed working line, potentially reducing the fan surge margin to a dangerous level, particularly at lower throttle settings. Readers unfamiliar with surge lines, working lines, etc. should read the Wikipedia article on compressor map.

There are two solutions to this problem:

1) Open up the cold nozzle area at low flight speeds, which moves the fan working line away from the surge. This has little effect on the position or slope of the surge line.

OR

2) Make the effective surge line of the fan shallower by progressively reducing the pitch of the fan as the engine is throttled. As the pitch is reduced the fan map contracts in terms of both mass flow and pressure ratio, with the surge line moving to the left and downwards. All of this has little effect on the slope and position of the fan operating line.

One advantage of the variable fan option is that varying the fan pitch offers the possibility of reversing engine thrust without the need for heavy blocker doors, cascades, etc.

The pitch of the fan can be reversed through feathering as with the Turbomeca Astafan or through fine pitch as employed in the Rolls-Royce/SNECMA M45SD-02.

With reverse thrust engaged, the air for the fan typically enters the engine through an auxiliary intake formed by a longitudinal gap which is exposed near the cold nozzle exit plane. The bulk of this air is expelled through the normal air intake thus providing a force resisting forward motion. However, the remaining air has to undertake some sort of U-turn so that it can enter the engine core (i.e. gas generator) to provide the energy to drive the fan.

Normally a low specific thrust turbofan would have an ultra-high bypass ratio and be fitted with a reduction gearbox between the fan and the LP shaft to allow the IP compressor and LP turbine to operate at a much higher rotational speed than the fan to reduce the number of stages required in these multi-stage devices.

Rolls-Royce are currently developing the Ultrafan which employs much of what is described above.

In the 1980s the General Electric GE36 Unducted Fan (UDF), which actually flew on a McDonnell Douglas MD-80, employed two rows of contra-rotating variable pitch fan blades, albeit without any fan casing because it was a prop-fan engine.
