= Rolls-Royce/SNECMA M45H =

1970s British/French turbofan aircraft engine

M45H
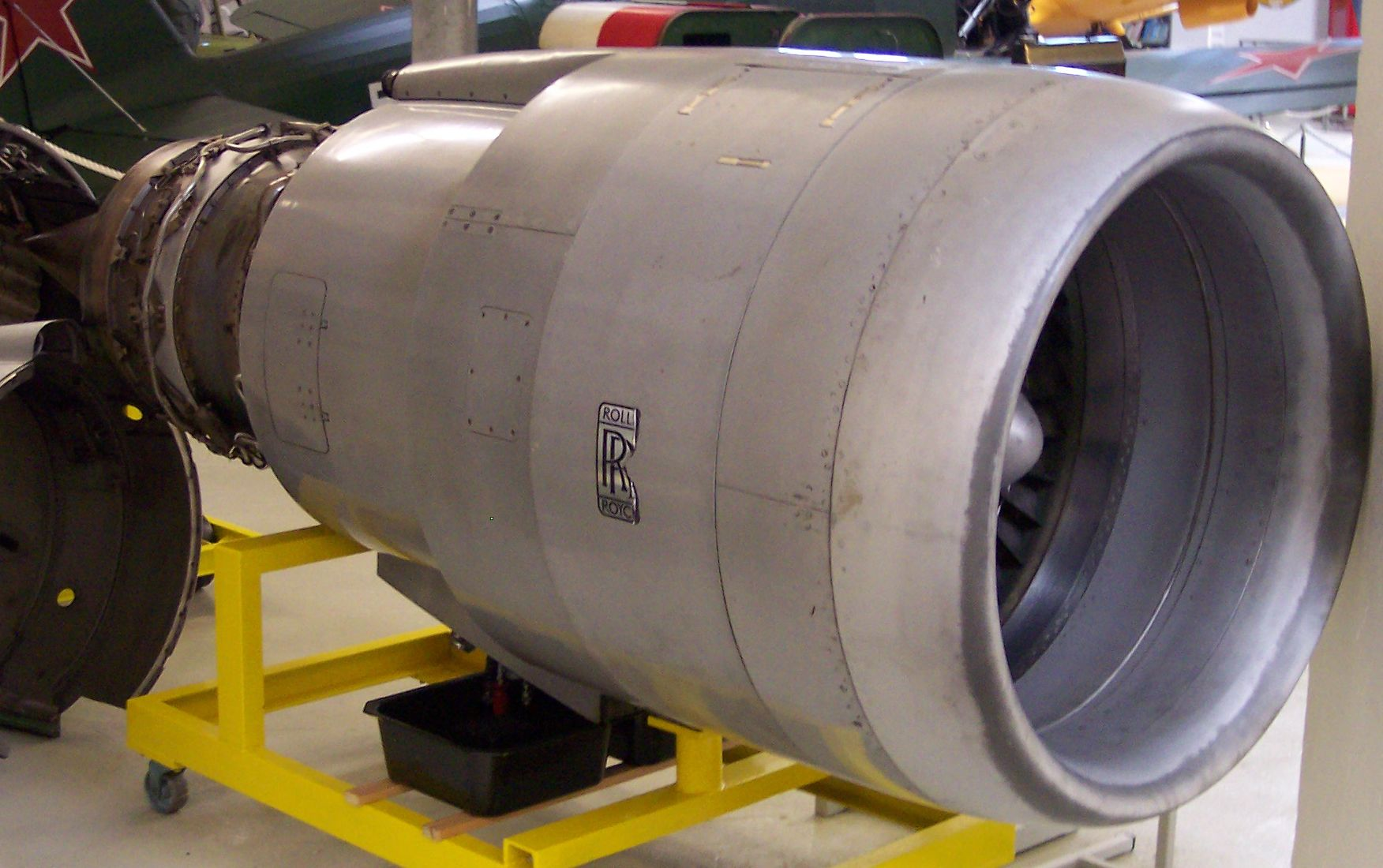
- M45H engine on display
- Type: Turbofan
- National origin: United Kingdom / France
- Manufacturer: Rolls-Royce/SNECMA
- First run: 1970
- Major applications: VFW-Fokker 614
- Developed from: SNECMA M45

The Rolls-Royce/SNECMA M45H is an Anglo-French medium bypass ratio turbofan produced specifically for the twin-engined VFW-Fokker 614 aircraft in the early 1970s.

The design was started as a collaborative effort between Bristol Siddeley and SNECMA.

== Design and development ==
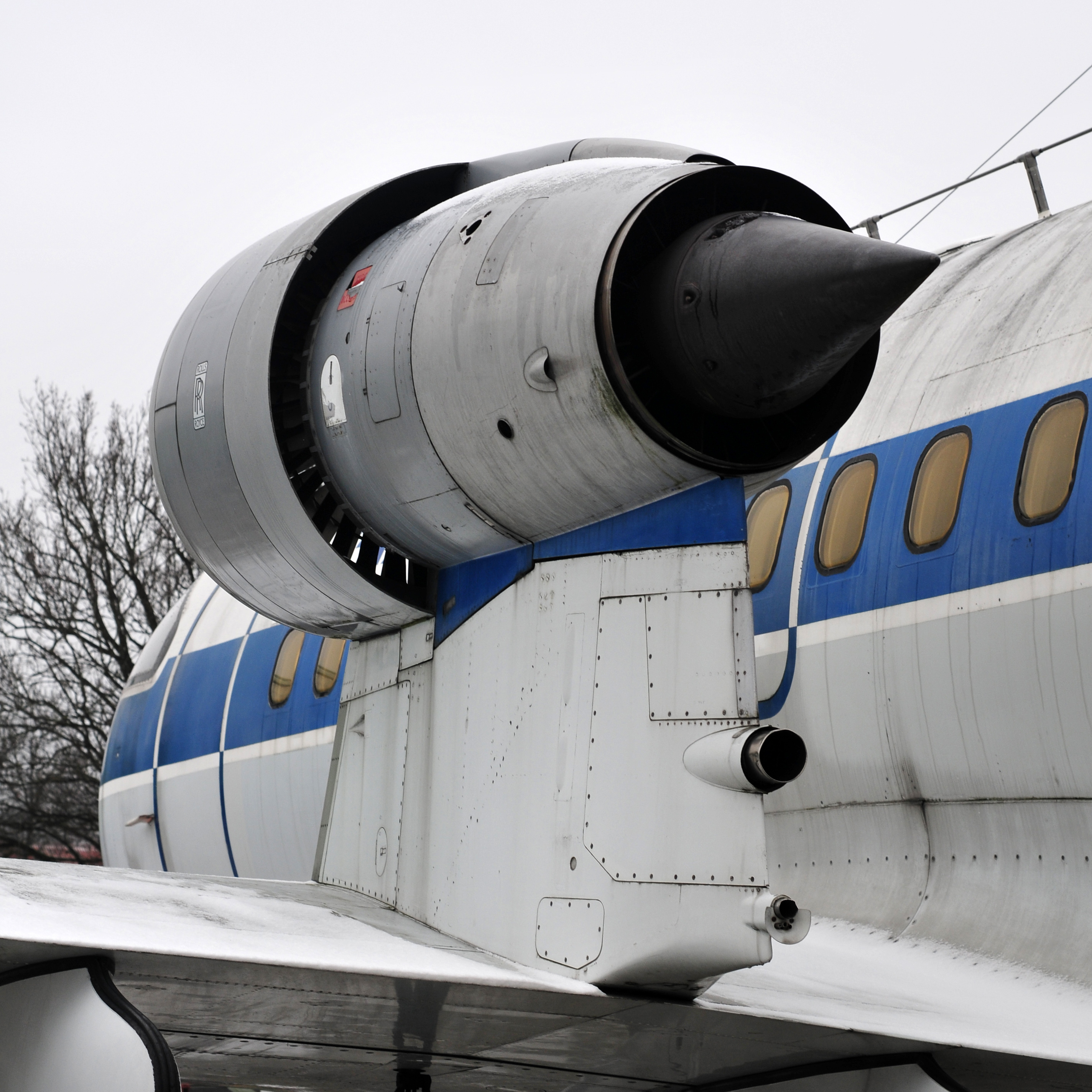
An M45H in its overwing mount on the VFW-Fokker 614

The VFW 614 was designed to operate over short sectors with up to a dozen flights a day. The engines were optimized for 30-minute sectors at a cruise altitude of 21,000 feet at Mach 0.65. Only a few minutes would be spent at the cruise rating and most of the flight would be at the higher climb rating or at a descent setting. The engine had a low turbine entry temperature and comparatively low rotational speed.

The engine was designed to be uprated without drastic redesign. Three options were water injection (+10% thrust), improved HP turbine (+10% thrust), addition of a zero-stage to the LP compressor (+25% thrust). The M45H-01 was to have a thrust-specific fuel consumption (TSFC) of 12.91 grams per kilonewton per second (0.456 pounds per pound-force per hour).

The engine was developed at the time of the Rolls-Royce bankruptcy which resulted in delays in developing the engine.

== Variants ==
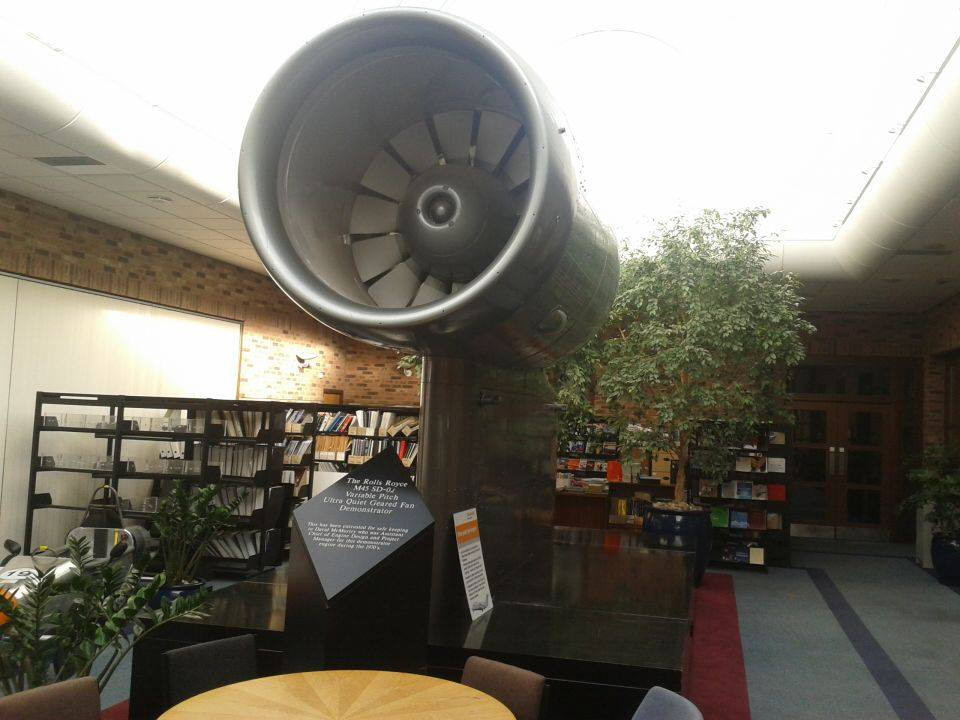
The M45SD-02 variable geometry fan engine at the New Mills Technology Centre.

M45F
Civil low bypass turbofan 7,915 lbf (35.21 kN) for take-off.
M45G
Military low bypass turbofan 13,200 lbf (58.72 kN) for take-off, wet.
M45H
Civil medium bypass turbofan 7,880 lbf (35.05 kN) for take-off, wet.
RB.410
Rolls-Royce designation for the M45SD-02 geared turbofan
M45SD-02
A derivative of the M45H-01 turbofan, designed to demonstrate ultra-quiet engine technologies, needed for STOL aircraft operating from city centre airports. A geared, variable pitch fan, replaced the first stage of the low pressure (LP) compressor. A modest fan pressure ratio, consistent with the high bypass ratio, meant a low fan tip speed could be employed. A low hot jet velocity was another major design feature. In reverse thrust, intake air entered the bypass duct, via a gap in the cold nozzle outer wall, and went through the fan, to be expelled through the intake. A small proportion of the bypass duct air entered the IP compressor, via a special diverter valve, to sustain the gas generator. Reverse thrust was obtained by the fan going through fine (rather than feather) pitch. Engine testing took place in the mid 1970s. The chief engineer of this project was David McMurtry, co-founder and Chairman of Renishaw PLC. After the prototype engine was stored, it was given to McMurtry for safe keeping at the New Mills site.

== Engines on display ==
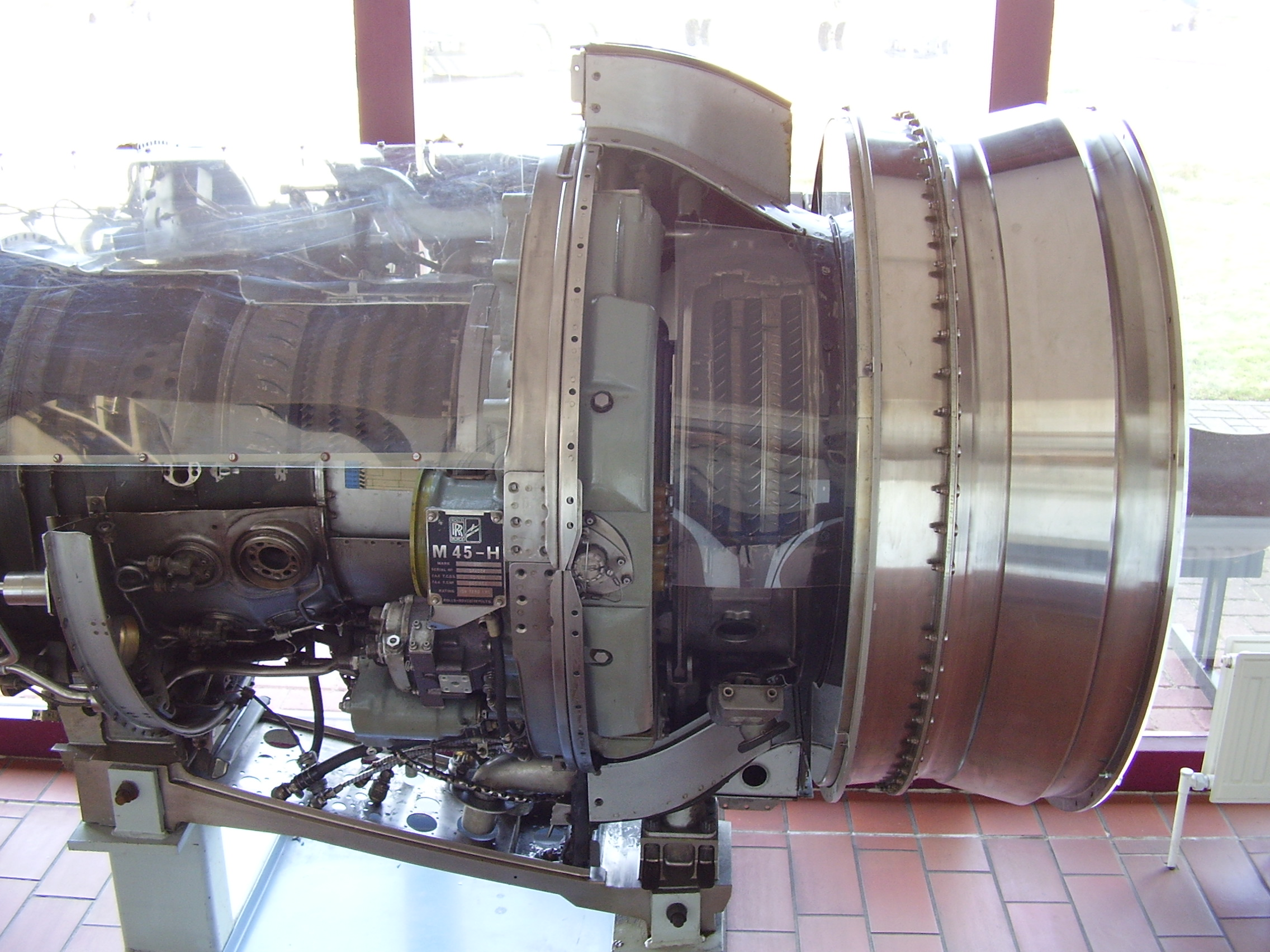
Cutout at the Aeronauticum museum

Rolls-Royce/SNECMA M45H engines are on display as part of the aero engine collection at the Royal Air Force Museum Cosford and the Musée aéronautique et spatial Safran. Additionally, an engine, with its cowl and pylon, is displayed at the Deutsches Museum Flugwerft Schleissheim; this museum also displays a VFW-614, which has two engines mounted.

== Specifications (M45H Mk.501) ==
Data from Jane's All the World's Aircraft 1971-72.

==== General characteristics ====
- Type: Turbofan
- Length: 2,600 mm (102.4in)
- Diameter: 909 mm (35.8 in)
- Dry weight: 673 kg (1,483 lb)

==== Components ====
- Compressor: 5-stage intermediate pressure and 7-stage high-pressure axial compressor with a single-stage fan
- Bypass ratio: 2.85:1
- Combustors: Annular with 24 vapourising burners
- Turbine: 3-stage low pressure and single-stage high pressure turbines
- Fuel type: Aviation kerosene (JetA-1 typically)
- Oil system: pressure return system at 207 kPa (30 psi)

==== Performance ====
- Maximum thrust: 7,300 lbf (32.4 kN)
- Overall pressure ratio: 16.5:1
- Air mass flow: 104 kg/s (230 lb/s)
- Thrust-to-weight ratio: 4.9:1

== See also ==
Related development

- SNECMA M45

Comparable engines

- General Electric CF34

Related lists

- List of aircraft engines
