= CFM International RISE =

In-development aircraft open rotor engine

RISE
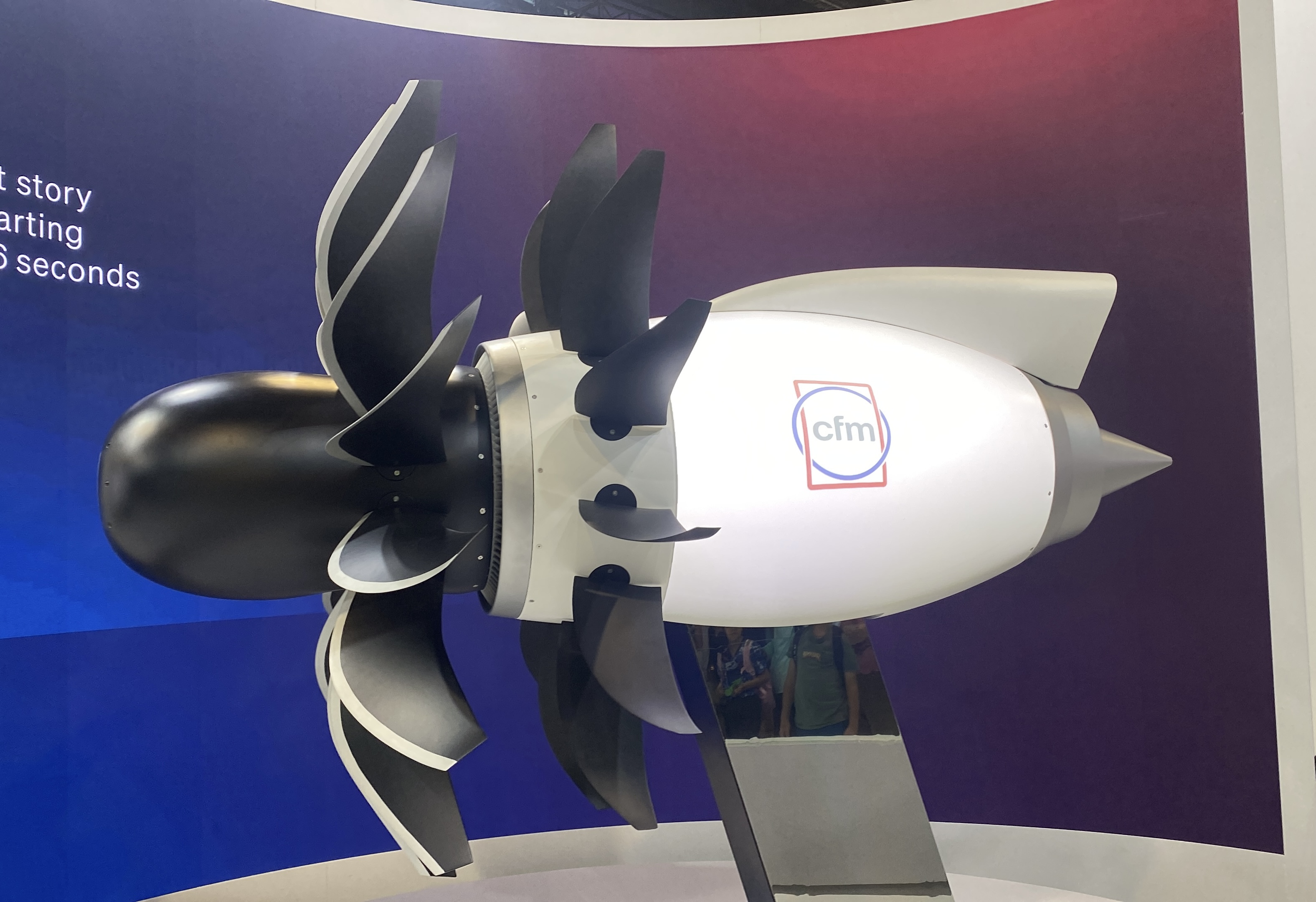
- Mockup of the RISE at the 2024 Singapore Airshow
- Type: Open rotor engine
- National origin: France and United States
- Manufacturer: CFM International
- Status: Under development

The CFM International RISE ("Revolutionary Innovation for Sustainable Engines") is an open rotor engine currently under development by CFM International, a 50–50 joint venture between American GE Aerospace and French Safran Aircraft Engines. The engine is planned to support both hydrogen and sustainable aviation fuels, and plans are to achieve a 20% reduction in fuel burn and carbon dioxide emissions compared to similar earlier experimental designs by the two CFM parent companies SAFRAN and GE Aviation (now GE Aerospace), and others.

== Development ==
=== Background ===
The 1973 oil crisis increased oil prices in the 1970s, which caused engine manufacturers to research new technologies to reduce fuel burn, including open rotor (also known as propfan) engines. However, none of those designs made it to production aircraft, mostly due to decreasing oil prices and concerns over the engines' noise footprint.

Both Safran and GE Aviation experimented with open rotor based engine designs before RISE was announced. Safran performed ground tests for an open rotor engine in 2019 as a part of the European Union's Clean Sky project and GE performed wind tunnel tests on a derivative of the GE36 engine at the start of the 2010s in collaboration with the Federal Aviation Administration.

=== Announcement ===
CFM International announced the RISE program in June 2021 as an intended successor of the CFM LEAP turbofan engine, with plans for the engine to enter service in the mid-2030s. At the 2022 Farnborough Airshow in July of that year, CFM International and Airbus announced plans to start flight tests on an Airbus A380-based testbed in 2026.

In June 2023, General Electric tested the first rotating components of the new engine, mating the first high-speed, low-pressure turbine stage to a GE F110 military test engine. As of late 2023, GE was producing test parts en route to a demonstrator engine for flight testing. The demonstrator would pair an open fan set with a GE Passport gas generator.

== Design ==
Unlike the GE36 and PW-Allison 578-DX contra-rotating engines that were proposed in the 1980s and Safran's open rotor engine in the 2010s, the RISE has a single-stage open rotor. The rotor is followed by a non-rotating stage of stator vanes. The two stages have variable pitch control. The RISE has a tractor configuration placing the rotor at the front of the engine, unlike the pusher configuration of other engines. The single-rotating design was validated by the IRON project as part of the Clean Sky 2 program. GE had dubbed the concept the Unducted Single Fan (USF) engine. The fixed stator vanes vary their pitch to collimate, or de-swirl, the flow, and they can close almost completely together to act as an air brake, avoiding the need for a thrust reverser. The RISE will also use a recuperator, which captures waste heat from the exhaust gas to pre-heat the air that exits the compressor before it enters the combustor.

As of 2025, the conventional turbofan and cowling are replaced with a larger, open turbofan. The new engine is claimed to reduce fuel consumption by 20% and will run on sustainable aviation fuels (SAF) at blends of up to 100%.

== Applications ==
- Boeing X-66A (proposed)

== See also ==
Related development

- CFM International LEAP
- General Electric GE36
- Rolls-Royce RB3011

Related lists

- List of aircraft engines
