= Propfan =

Type of aircraft engine

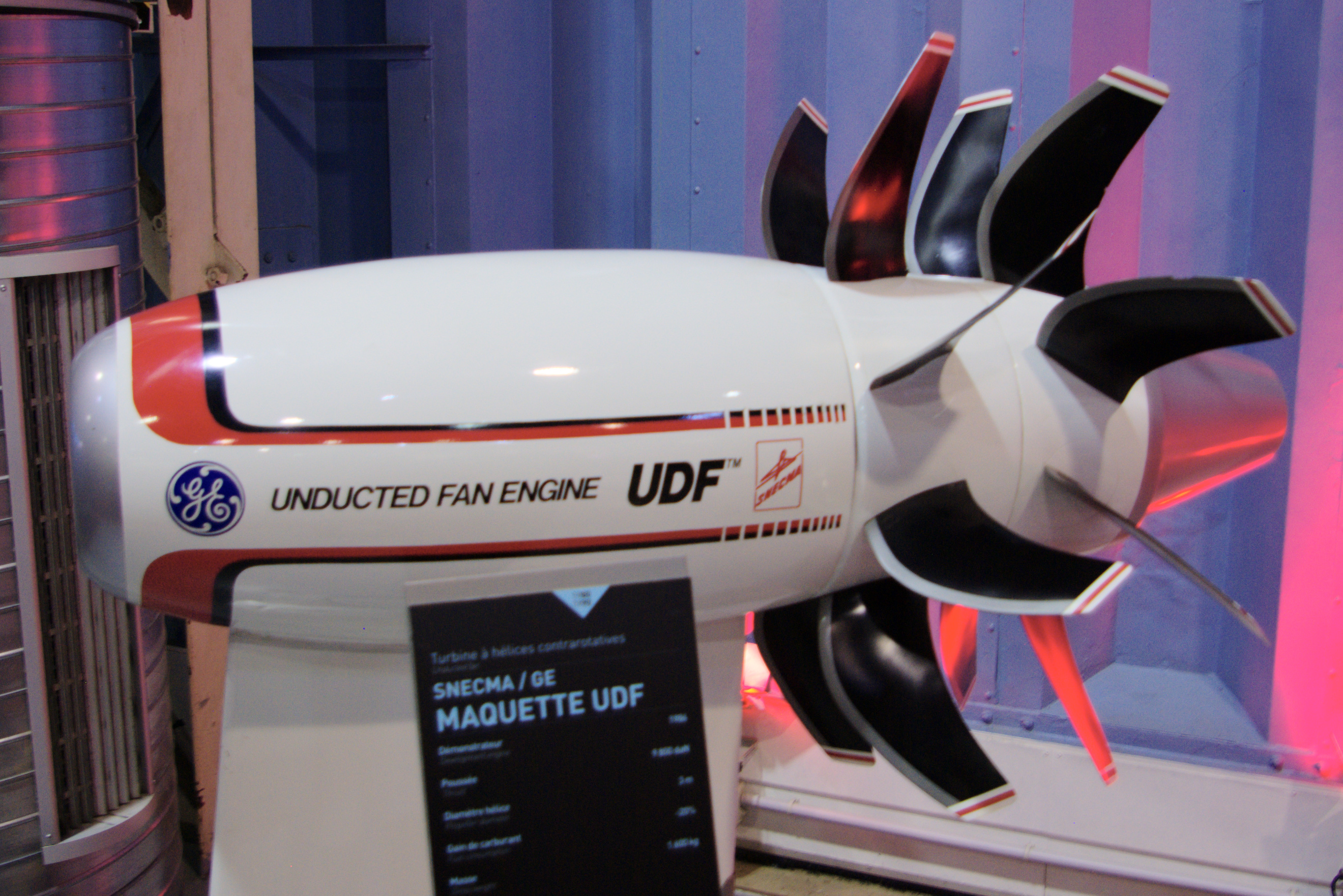
Mockup of a prototype GE36 at the Musée aéronautique et spatial Safran

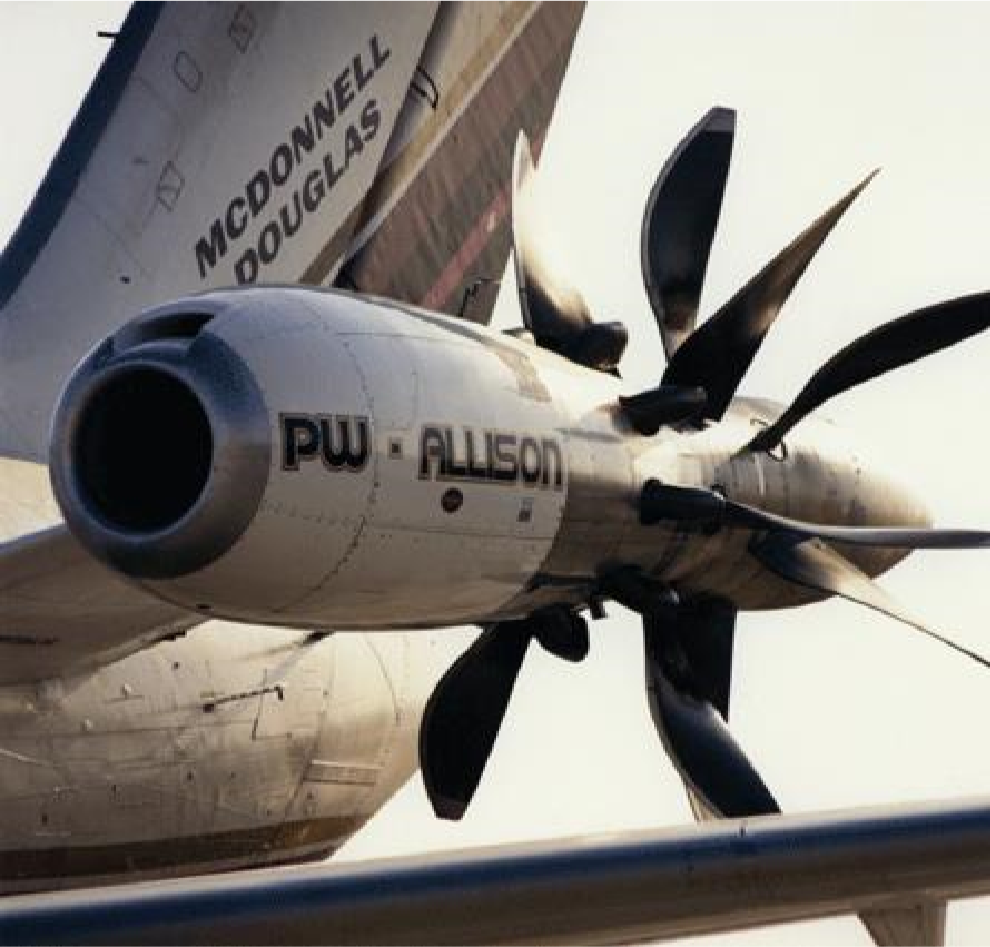
A closeup of the PW–Allison 578-DX propfan demonstrator installed on the port side of a McDonnell Douglas MD-80 testbed

A propfan, also called a propjet, an open rotor engine, or an open fan engine, is an aircraft engine combining features of turbofans and turboprops. It uses advanced, curved propeller blades without a duct. Propfans first started prototype testing in the 1970s, aiming to combine the speed capability of turbofans with the fuel efficiency of turboprops, especially at high subsonic speeds. However, they have never proceeded beyond testing, never going into commercial use. Over the decades, different efforts to perfect the concept have used names like "open rotor" and "ultra-high-bypass (UHB) turbofan".

== Definition ==
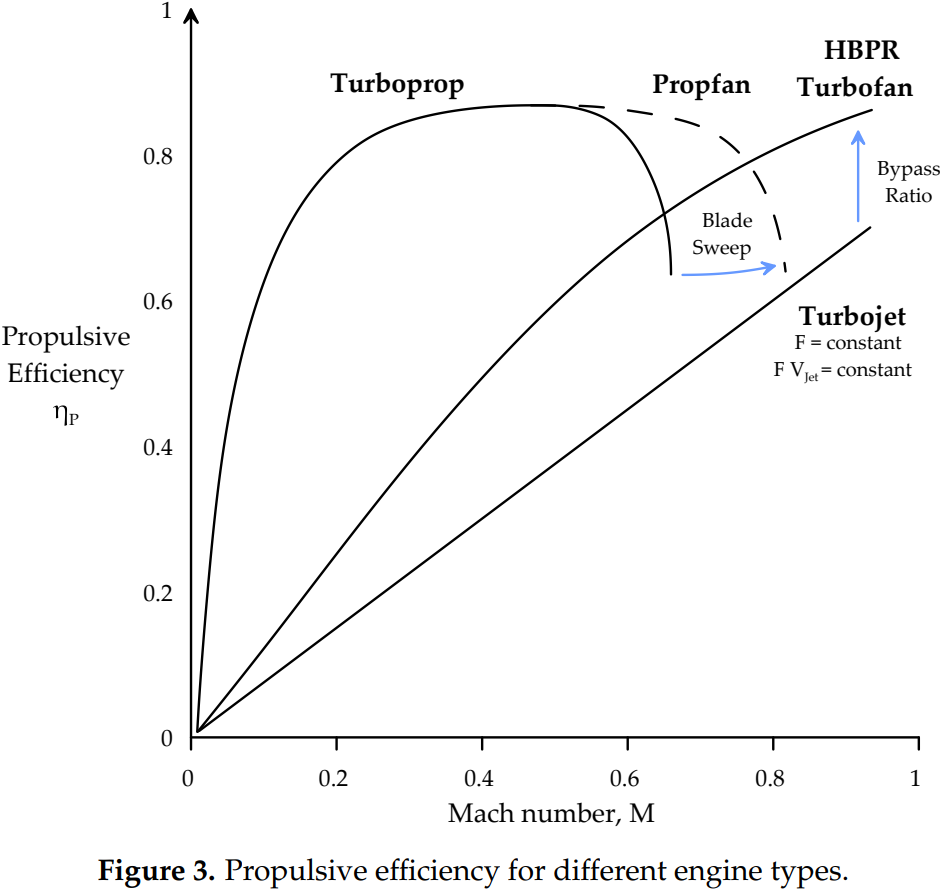
Propulsive efficiency comparison for various gas turbine engine configurations

In the 1970s, Hamilton Standard described its propfan as "a small diameter, highly loaded multiple bladed variable pitch propulsor having swept blades with thin advanced airfoil sections, integrated with a nacelle contoured to retard the airflow through the blades thereby reducing compressibility losses and designed to operate with a turbine engine and using a single stage reduction gear resulting in high performance". In 1982, the weekly aviation magazine Flight International defined the propfan as a propeller with 8–10 highly swept blades that cruised at a speed of 390–480 knots (450–550 miles per hour; 720–890 kilometres per hour), although its definition evolved a few years later with the emergence of contra-rotating propfans.

In 1986, British engine maker Rolls-Royce used the term open rotor as a synonym for the original meaning of a propfan. This action was to delineate the propfan engine type from a number of ducted engine proposals at the time that had propfan in their names. By the 2000s, open rotor (OR) became a preferred term for propfan technology in research and news reports, with contra-rotating open rotor (CROR) also occasionally being used to distinguish between single-rotation propfans. As of 2015, the European Aviation Safety Agency (EASA) defined an open rotor concretely (but broadly) as "a turbine engine fan stage that is not enclosed within a casing"; in contrast, it had only a working definition of an open rotor engine (the more commonly used term for propfan in the 21st century), calling it "a turbine engine featuring contra-rotating fan stages not enclosed within a casing." The engine uses a gas turbine to drive an unshrouded (open) contra-rotating propeller like a turboprop, but the design of the propeller itself is more tightly coupled to the turbine design, and the two are certified as a single unit.

In a 2017 Ahmed El-Sayed, a professor in the design and performance of aircraft engines, differentiated between turboprops (which have been in use since the 1940s) and propfans (which have yet to advance beyond a few prototypes) according to 11 different criteria, including number of blades, blade shape, tip speed, bypass ratio, Mach number, and cruise altitude.

== History ==
About a decade after German aerospace engineers began exploring the idea of using swept wings to reduce drag on transonic speed aircraft, Hamilton Standard in the 1940s attempted to apply a similar concept to aircraft propellers. It created highly swept propeller blades with supersonic tip speeds, so that engines with exposed propellers could power aircraft to speeds and cruising altitudes only attained by new turbojet and turbofan engines. Early tests of these blades revealed then-unresolvable blade flutter and blade stress problems, and high noise levels were considered another obstacle. The popularity of turbojets and turbofans curtailed research in propellers, but by the 1960s, interest increased when studies showed that an exposed propeller driven by a gas turbine could power an airliner flying at a speed of Mach 0.7–0.8 and at an altitude of 35,000 feet (11,000 metres). The term propfan was created during this period.

One of the earliest engines that resembled the propfan concept was the 4,710 pounds-force (21.0 kilonewtons) Metrovick F.5, which featured twin contra-rotating fans—14 blades in the fore (front) fan and 12 blades in the aft (back) fan—at the rear of the engine and was first run in 1946. The blades, however, were mostly unswept. Other contra-rotating propeller engines that featured on common aircraft included the four powerful Kuznetsov NK-12 engines (each powering its own set of coaxial contra-rotating propellers) on the Soviet Union's Tupolev Tu-95 high-speed military bomber and Antonov An-22 military transport aircraft, and the Armstrong Siddeley Double Mamba (ASMD) engines (both connected to a lone set of coaxial contra-rotating propellers) on the British Fairey Gannet anti-submarine aircraft. Both setups had four largely unswept blades in the front propeller and the back propeller.

=== 1970s–1980s ===
When the 1973 oil crisis caused petroleum price spikes in the early 1970s, interest in propfans soared, and NASA-funded research began to accelerate. The propfan concept was outlined by Carl Rohrbach and Bruce Metzger of the Hamilton Standard division of United Technologies in 1975 and was patented by Rohrbach and Robert Cornell of Hamilton Standard in 1979. Later work by General Electric on similar propulsors adopted the name unducted fan, which was a modified turbofan engine, with the fan placed outside the engine nacelle on the same axis as the compressor blades.

During this era, the propeller problems became fixable. Advances were made in structural materials, such as titanium metal and graphite and glass fiber composites infused with resin. These materials replaced aluminum and steel metals in blade construction, which allowed the blades to be made thinner and stronger. Computer-aided design was also useful in refining blade characteristics. Since the blades bend and deflect with higher power loading and centrifugal force, the initial designs needed to be based on the in-motion shape. With the help of computers, the blade designers would then work backward to find the optimal unloaded shape for manufacturing purposes.

==== Flight test programs ====
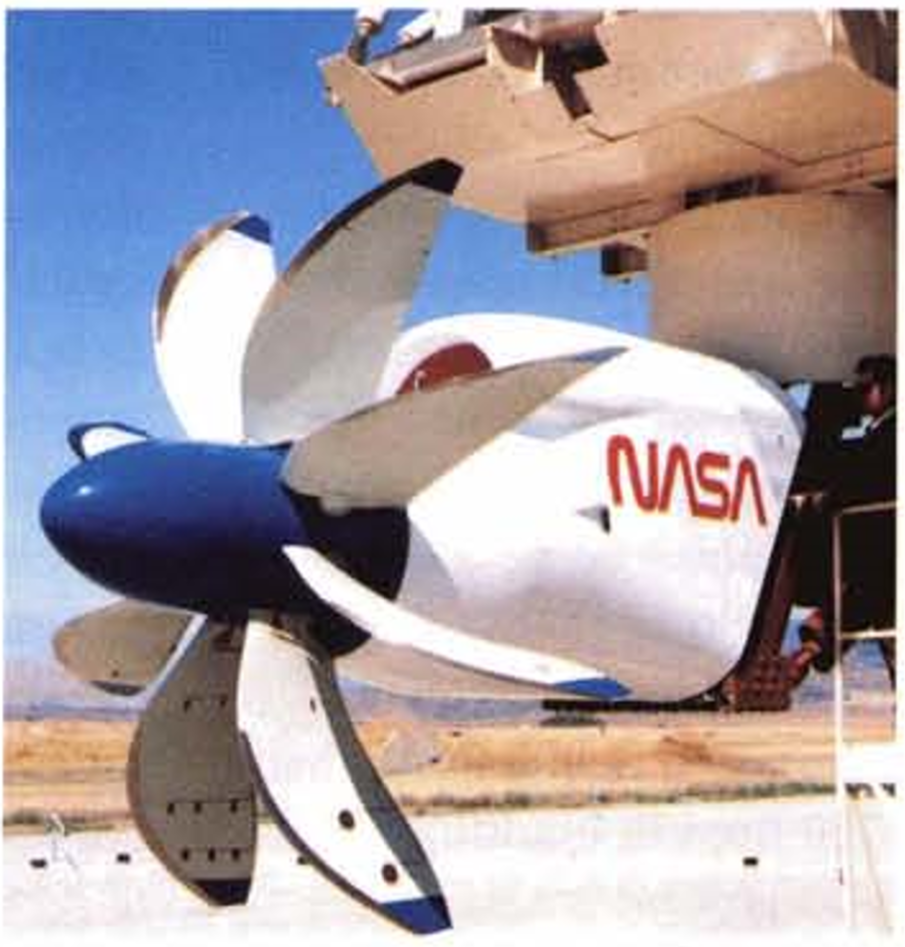
Ground–test installation of the Allison 501-M78 engine with an eight-bladed, 9.0 ft (2.7 m) diameter Hamilton Standard propeller for the NASA Propfan Test Assessment

Hamilton Standard, the only large American manufacturer of aircraft propellers, developed the propfan concept in the early 1970s. Hamilton Standard tested numerous variations in conjunction with NASA.

Under the Propfan Test Assessment (PTA) program, Lockheed-Georgia proposed modifying a Gulfstream II to act as in-flight testbed for the propfan concept, while McDonnell Douglas proposed modifying a DC-9 for the same purpose. NASA chose the Lockheed proposal. The Gulfstream II had a nacelle added to the left wing, containing a 6,000 horsepower (4,500 kilowatts) Allison 570 turboprop engine (derived from the XT701 turboshaft developed for the Boeing Vertol XCH-62 heavy lift helicopter). The engine used an eight-bladed, 9-foot diameter (2.7-metre; 110-inch; 270-centimetre), single-rotation Hamilton Standard SR-7 propfan. The test engine, which was named the Allison 501-M78, had a thrust rating of 9,000 lbf (40 kN). It was first operated in flight on March 28, 1987. The extensive test program, which cost about $56 million, racked up 73 flights and over 133 hours of flight time before finishing on March 25, 1988. In 1989, however, the testbed aircraft returned to the air from April 3 through April 14 to measure ground noise levels during flight. The engine was removed after that, and the aircraft was converted to a space shuttle training aircraft later that year.

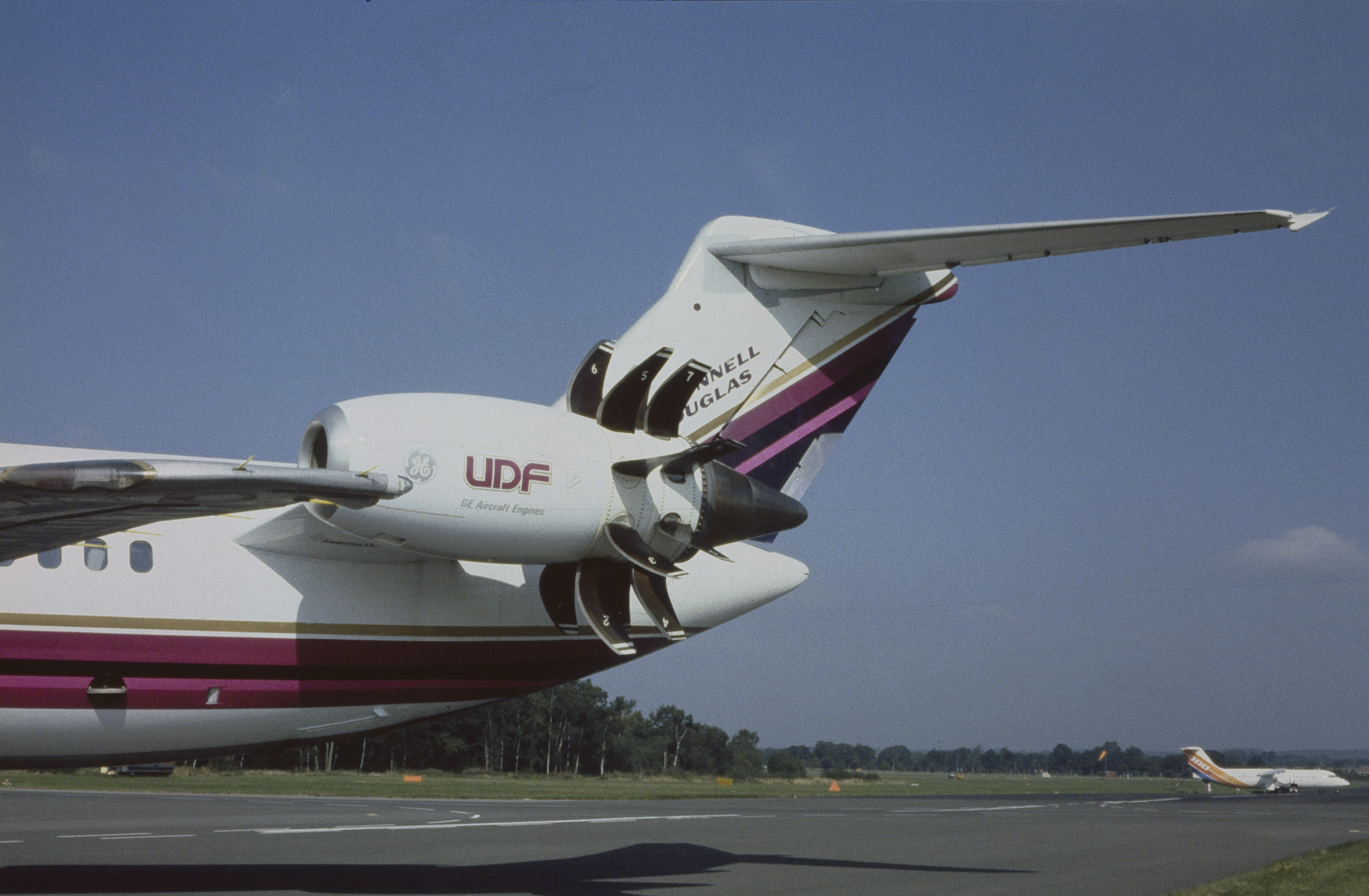
The GE36 on a McDonnell Douglas MD-80 demonstrator at the 1988 Farnborough Air Show. The gearless unducted fan engine had an overall diameter of 11.67 ft (3.56 m), with either eight or ten blades in front (depending on the particular configuration) and eight blades in back.

The GE36 Unducted Fan (UDF), from American engine maker General Electric (GE) with 35-percent participation from French partner Snecma (now Safran), was a variation on the original propfan concept and resembled a pusher configuration piston engine. GE's UDF had a novel direct-drive arrangement, where the reduction gearbox was replaced by a low-speed seven-stage free turbine. One set of turbine rotors drove the forward set of propellers, while the rear set was driven by the other set of rotors which rotated in the opposite direction. The turbine had 14 blade rows with seven stages. Each stage was a pair of contra-rotating rows. Airframers, who had been wary of issue-prone gearboxes since the 1950s, liked GE's gearless version of the propfan: Boeing intended to offer GE's pusher UDF engine on the 7J7 platform (which would have had a cruise speed of Mach 0.83), and McDonnell Douglas planned to do likewise on their MD-94X airliner. The GE36 was first flight tested mounted on the #3 engine station of a Boeing 727-100 on August 20, 1986. The GE36 UDF for the 7J7 was planned to have a thrust of 25,000 pounds-force (110 kN), but GE claimed that in general its UDF concept could cover a thrust range of 9,000 to 75,000 lbf (40 to 334 kN), so a UDF engine could possibly match or surpass the thrust of the CF6, GE's family of widebody engines at that time.

McDonnell Douglas developed a proof-of-concept aircraft by modifying its company-owned MD-80, which is suited for propfans due to its aft fuselage-mounted engines (like its DC-9 ancestor), in preparation for the possible propfan-powered MD-91 and MD-92 derivatives and a possible MD-94X clean-sheet aircraft. They replaced the left side JT8D turbofan engine with the GE36. Test flights began in May 1987, which proved the design's airworthiness, aerodynamic characteristics, and noise signature. Following the initial tests, a first-class cabin was installed inside the aft fuselage and airline executives were offered the opportunity to experience the UDF-powered aircraft first-hand. The test and marketing flights of the GE-outfitted demonstrator aircraft concluded in 1988, exhibiting a 30% reduction in fuel consumption over turbo-fan powered MD-80, full Stage 3 noise compliance, and low levels of interior noise/vibration. The GE36 would have the same 25,000 lbf (110 kN) thrust on the MD-92X, but the same engine would be derated to 22,000 lbf (98 kN) thrust for the smaller MD-91X. The MD-80 was also successfully flight tested in April 1989 with the 578-DX propfan, which was a prototype from the Allison Engine Company (at that time a division of General Motors) that was also derived from the Allison XT701 and built with Hamilton Standard propellers. The engine program was jointly developed between Allison and another division of United Technologies, the engine maker Pratt & Whitney. Unlike the competing GE36 UDF, the 578-DX was fairly conventional, having a reduction gearbox between the LP turbine and the propfan blades. Due to jet fuel price drops and shifting marketing priorities, Douglas shelved the propfan program later that year.

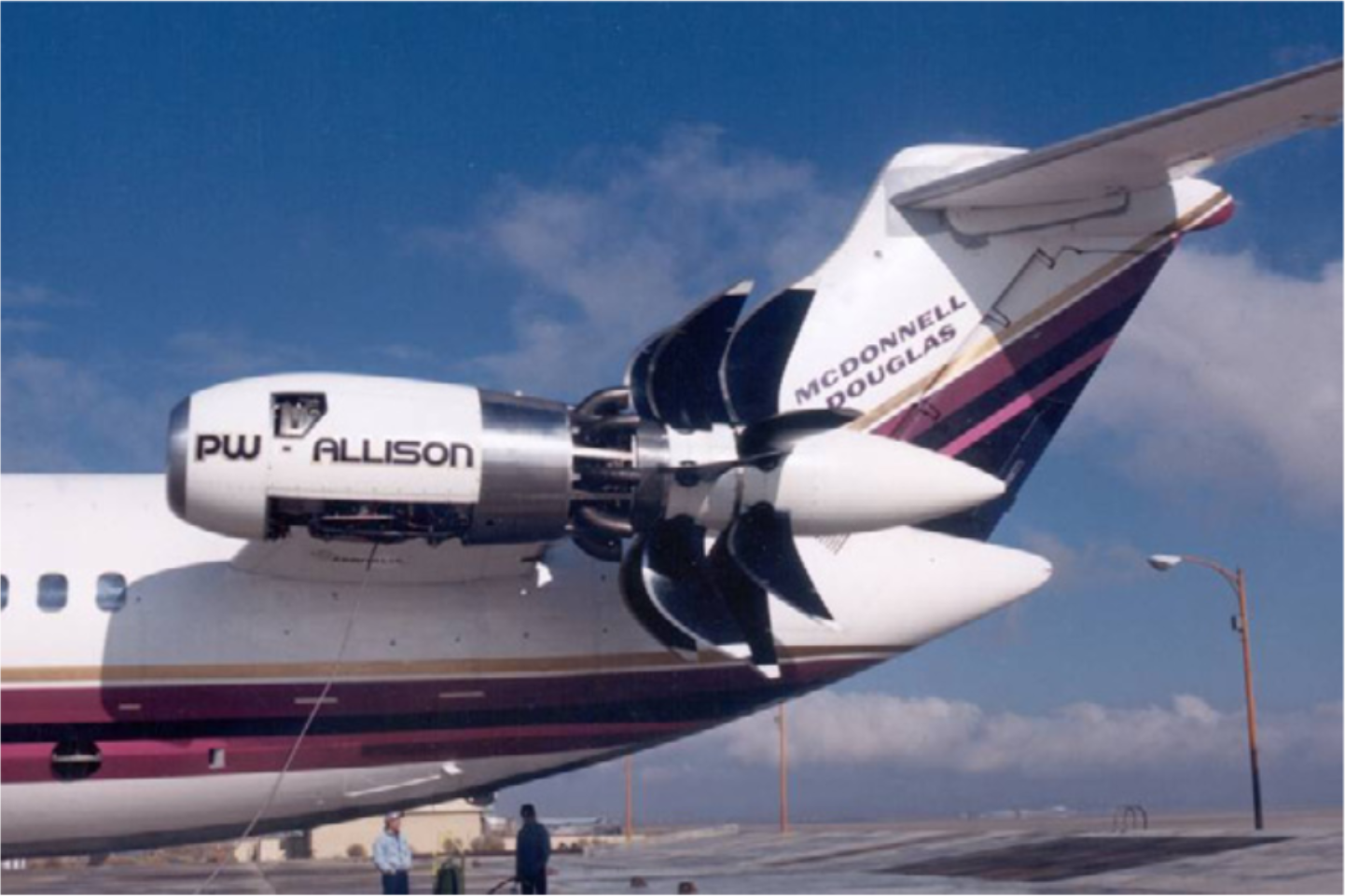
The PW–Allison 578-DX prototype engine installed on the same MD-80 testbed. The contra-rotating, geared propfan engine is 11.6 ft (3.5 m) in diameter, with six blades in front and six blades in back.

==== Other proposed applications ====
Other announcements of future propfan-powered airliners included:

- The Fokker FXX, a 100–120 seat propfan-powered aircraft that was studied in 1982
- The MPC 75, an 80-seat, Mach 0.76 cruise speed, 1,500 nmi range (1,700 mi; 2,800 km) regional aircraft conceived by Messerschmitt-Bölkow-Blohm (MBB) of West Germany and the Chinese Aero Technology Export/Import Corporation (CATIC); used as the baseline powerplant two direct-drive General Electric GE38-B5 UDF engines delivering 9,644 and 2,190 lbf (4,374 and 993 kgf; 42.90 and 9.74 kN) in static thrust and cruise with a thrust-specific fuel consumption (TSFC) of 0.240 and 0.519 lb/(lbf⋅h) (6.8 and 14.7 g/(kN⋅s)), respectively, through an 85 in (2.1 m) diameter propfan with 11 and 9 blades on the contra-rotating propellers; proposed as an alternative powerplant the 14,500 lbf (6,600 kgf; 64 kN) static thrust, PW–Allison 501-M80E geared propfan engine, which was derived from the 501-M80C turboshaft that was chosen to power the United States Navy's Osprey tiltrotor aircraft; later described the propfan engine as one with the core from the T406 (the military designation for the Osprey's powerplant), containing a 108 in diameter (2.7 m) propfan that provided 2,450 lbf (1,110 kgf; 10.9 kN) of thrust in cruise with a TSFC of 0.51 lb/(lbf⋅h) (14 g/(kN⋅s))
- The ATR 92, a 400 kn cruising speed (460 mph; 740 km/h), five- or six-abreast, 100-seat aircraft from Avions de Transport Regional (ATR, a joint venture between France's Aerospatiale and Italy's Aeritalia) and Spain's Construcciones Aeronáuticas SA (CASA), which would possibly be powered by the UDF
- The Aerospatiale AS.100, a regional aircraft with a range of 1,500 nmi (1,700 mi; 2,800 km), a cruise speed of Mach 0.74–0.78 at 30,000 ft (9,100 m) altitude, and a capacity of 80–100 seats, that might be powered by the UDF or by a propfan version of the Allison T406 tiltrotor engine
- The ATRA-90 (Advanced Technology Regional Aircraft), an 83– to 115–seat aircraft with a range of 1,500–2,100 nmi (1,700–2,400 mi; 2,800–3,900 km) and a cruise speed of Mach 0.8 at 30,000 ft (9,100 m) altitude, that was to be built by a multinational joint venture consisting of Industri Pesawat Terbang Nusantara (IPTN) of Indonesia, Boeing (USA), MBB (West Germany), and Fokker (Netherlands)
- The Tupolev Tu-334, a 126-seat aircraft that can travel 1,860 nmi (2,140 mi; 3,450 km) with 11,430 kg payload (25,200 lb; 11.43 t; 12.60-short-ton), which is powered by two Progress (also known as Lotarev) D-236 propfans with a specific fuel burn of 0.46 kg/kg-thrust/hour, a cruise thrust of 1.6 tonnes-force (3,500 lbf; 16 kN), and a static thrust of 8 to 9 tf (18,000 to 20,000 lbf; 78 to 88 kN)
- The Ilyushin Il-88, a successor to the four-turboprop Antonov An-12 tactical transporter that would be powered by two 11,000 hp (8,200 kW) Progress D-236 propfans
- The Ilyushin Il-118, an upgrade to the four-turboprop Ilyushin Il-18 airliner; proposed in 1984, the aircraft would instead be powered by two D-236 propfans, with the eight-bladed front propeller on each engine rotating at a speed of 1,100 rpm and the six-bladed back propeller turning at 1,000 rpm to lower noise and vibration
- A re-engined Antonov An-124, replacing the four Progress D-18T turbofans by 55,100 lbf thrust (245.2 kN) Kuznetsov NK-62 propfans

==== Decline ====
None of these projects came to fruition, however, mainly because of excessive cabin noise (compared to turbofans) and low fuel prices. For General Electric, the GE36 UDF was meant to replace the CFM56 high-bypass turbofan that it produced with equal partner Snecma in their CFM International joint venture. In the 1980s the engine was initially uncompetitive against the International Aero Engines rival offering, the IAE V2500. In December 1986, the chairman of Snecma declared that the in-development CFM56-5S2 would be the last turbofan created for the CFM56 family, and that "There is no point in spending more money on turbofans. UDF is the future." The V2500 ran into technical problems in 1987, however, and the CFM56 gained major sales momentum. General Electric lost interest in having the GE36 cannibalize the CFM56, which went five years before it received its first order in 1979, and while "the UDF could be made reliable by earlier standards, turbofans were getting much, much better than that." General Electric added the UDF's blade technology directly into the GE90, the most powerful jet engine ever produced, for the Boeing 777.

=== 1990s ===
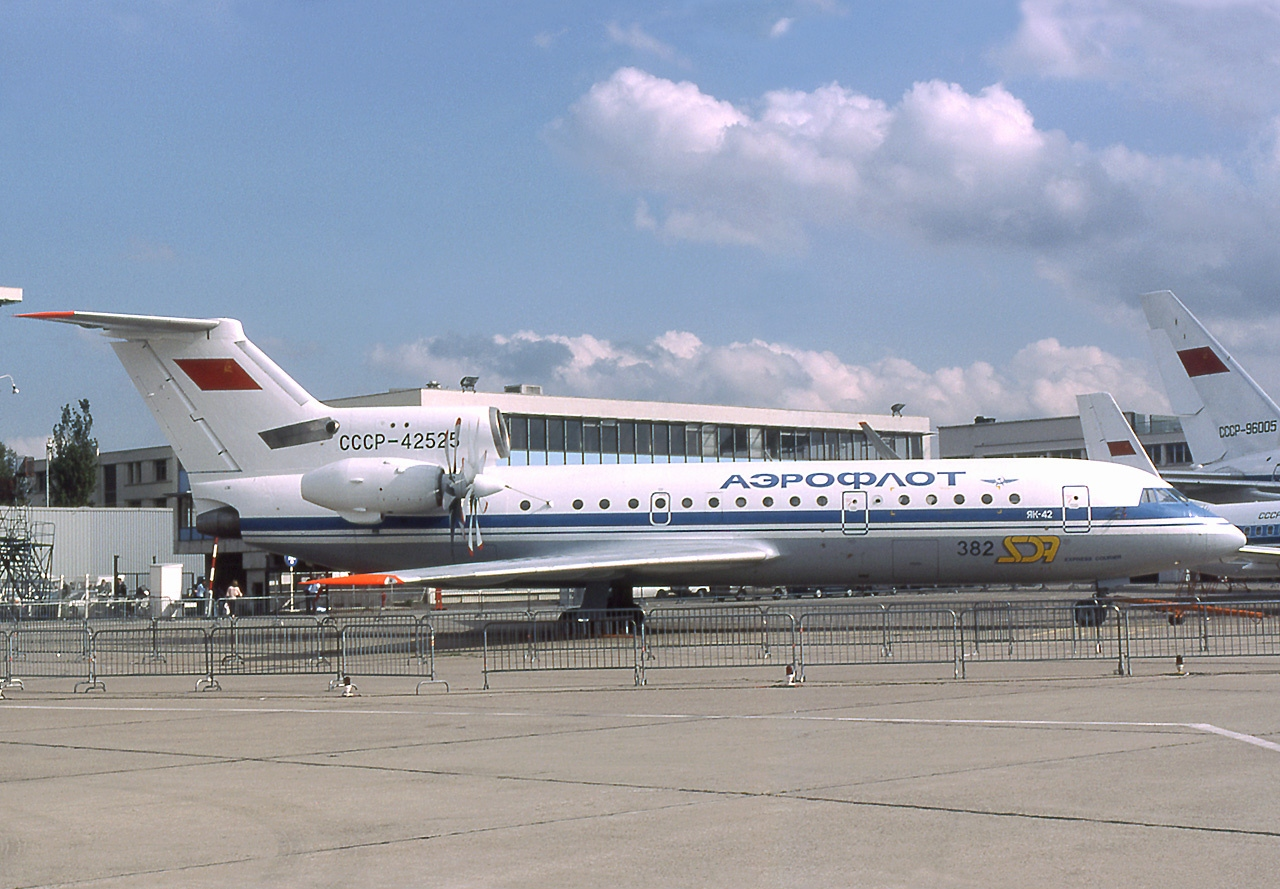
The Progress D-236 propfan engine on the Yak-42E-LL testbed aircraft at the Paris Air Show in 1991

At the beginning of the 1990s, the Soviet Union/Russia performed flight tests on the Progress D-236, a geared contra-rotating propfan engine based on the core of the Progress D-36 turbofan, with eight blades on the front propeller and six blades on the back propeller. One testbed was a 10,100 hp (7,500 kW) propfan mounted to an Ilyushin Il-76 and flown to the Hannover ILA 90 airshow, which was intended for an unidentified four-propfan aircraft. The D-236 flew 36 times for a total of 70 flight test hours on the Il-76. The other testbed was a 10,990 hp (8,195 kW), 14 ft unit (4.2 m; 170 in; 420 cm) mounted to a Yakovlev Yak-42E-LL and flown to the 1991 Paris Air Show, as a demonstration for the planned Yak-46 aircraft with twin propfan engines, which in its base 150-seat version would have a range of 1,900 nmi (2,200 mi; 3,500 km) and cruise at a speed of 460 kn (530 mph; 850 km/h; 780 ft/s; 240 m/s) (Mach 0.75). The Soviets claimed the D-236 had a true aerodynamic efficiency of 28 percent and a fuel savings of 30 percent over an equivalent turboprop. They also revealed plans for propfans with power ratings of 14,100 and 30,200 hp (10,500 and 22,500 kW).

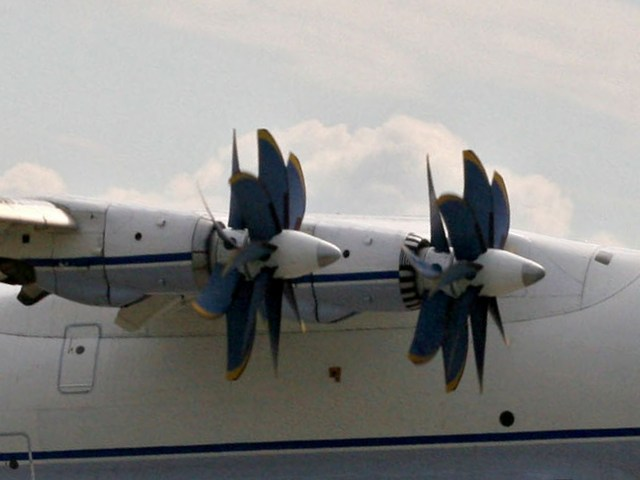
Progress D27 Propfans fitted to a prototype Antonov An-70

Like the Progress D-236, the more powerful Progress D-27 propfan engine is a contra-rotating propfan with eight front blades and six back blades, but the D-27 has advanced composite blades with a reduced thickness-to-chord ratio and a more pronounced curvature at the leading edge. An engine that was launched in 1985, the D-27 delivers 14,000 hp (10,440 kW) of power with 27,000 lbf (119 kN) of thrust at takeoff. Two rear-mounted D-27 propfans propelled the Ukrainian Antonov An-180, which was scheduled for a 1995 first flight and a 1997 entry into service. In January 1994, Antonov rolled out the first prototype of the An-70 military transport aircraft, powered by four Progress D-27s attached to wings mounted to the top of the fuselage. The Russian Air Force placed an order for 164 aircraft in 2003, later canceled. As of 2013, the An-70 was still thought to have a promising future as a freighter. Since the propeller component of the Progress D-27 is made by Russia's SPE Aerosila, however, the An-70 was stymied by the Russo-Ukrainian War. Antonov began working instead with Turkey in 2018 to redevelop the An-70 as a rebranded An-77, so that the aircraft can comply with modern-day requirements without Russian supplier participation.

=== Twenty-first century ===
In the first decade of the 21st century, rising jet fuel prices increased emphasis on engine/airframe efficiency to reduce emissions, which renewed interest in the propfan concept for jetliners beyond the Boeing 787 and Airbus A350XWB. For instance, Airbus patented aircraft designs with twin rear-mounted contra-rotating propfans. Rolls-Royce had the rear (pusher) configured RB.509-11 and front (tractor) configured RB.509-14 geared propfan designs, which produced 15,000–25,000 lbf thrust (6,800–11,300 kgf; 67–111 kN) using the gas generator from its XG-40 engine with 13,000 hp (9,700 kW) of shaft power. It became lukewarm on propfan technology in the 1980salthough it developed an open rotor design that was thought to be a finalist for the Irkut MS-21 narrowbody aircraft. The Rolls-Royce RB3011 engine would have a diameter of about 170 in (430 cm; 14 ft; 4.3 m) and require a 16,000 shaft hp (12,000 kW) gearbox.

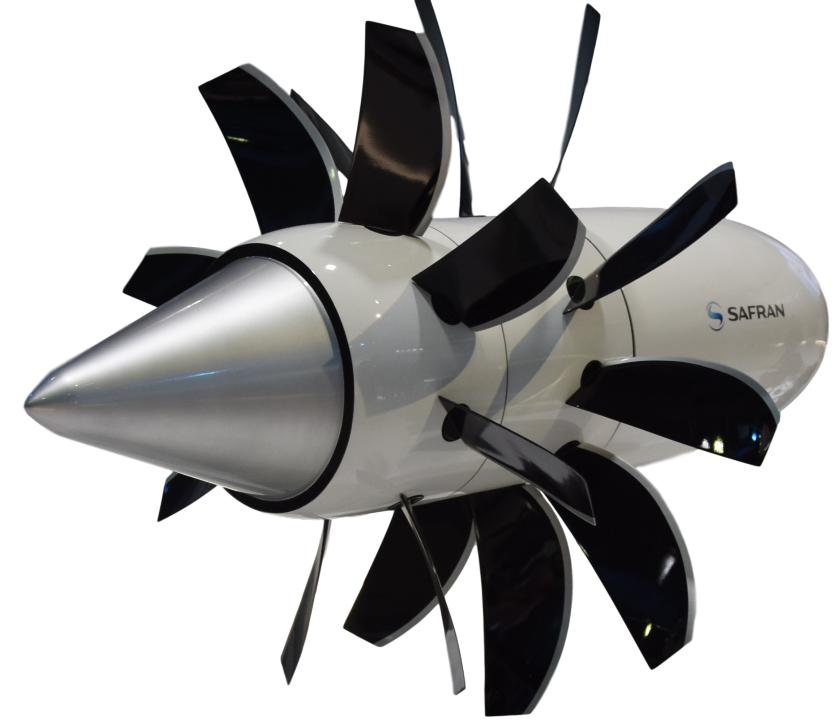
Safran open rotor mockup in 2017

The European Commission launched an Open Rotor demonstration in 2008 led by Safran within the Clean Sky program funded with €65 million over eight years. A demonstrator was assembled in 2015, and ground tested in May 2017 on its open-air test rig in Istres, aiming to reduce fuel consumption and associated CO_{2} emissions by 30% compared with current CFM56 turbofans. After the completion of ground testing at the end of 2017, Safran's geared open rotor engine had reached technology readiness level 5. The demonstrator's twelve-blade front propeller and ten-blade back propeller had diameters of 13.1 and 12.5 ft (4.0 and 3.8 m; 160 and 150 in; 400 and 380 cm), respectively. The demonstrator, based on the core of the Snecma M88 military fighter engine, uses up to 12,200 horsepower (9 megawatts), provides a thrust of about 22,000 lbf (100 kN), and would cruise at a speed of Mach 0.75. Safran's future open rotor engine, however, would have a maximum diameter of almost 14.8 ft (4.50 m; 177 in; 450 cm).

In 2007, the Progress D-27 was successfully modified to meet the United States Federal Aviation Administration (FAA) Stage 4 regulations, which correspond to International Civil Aviation Organization (ICAO) Chapter 4 standards. A 2012 trade study projected that propfan noise would be 10–13 decibels quieter than allowed by Stage 4 regulations. Stage 5 noise limits reduce the limits by only seven effective perceived noise decibels (EPNdB), within the propfan noise envelope. The study also projected that open rotors would be nine percent more fuel-efficient but remain 10–12 decibels louder than turbofans. Snecma claimed that its propfan engines would have about the same noise levels as its CFM LEAP turbofan engine.

In 2021, CFM International announced its Revolutionary Innovation for Sustainable Engines (RISE) development program to produce a single-stage, gear-driven propfan paired with active stators in a puller/tractor, configuration with flight tests to begin by 2025. The rotor was expected to be 12–13 ft (3.7–4.0 m) in diameter. The engine was expected to produce 20,000–35,000 lbf (9,100–15,900 kgf; 89–156 kN) of thrust, with a 20% increase in fuel efficiency. The company claimed its motivation was the global emphasis on reducing emissions. The engine was planned to support both hydrogen and sustainable aviation fuels. The engine was expected to include a compact high-pressure core and a recuperating system to preheat combustion air with exhaust heat along with ceramic matrix composites in the hot section and resin-transfer-molded composite fan blades. In addition to the rotor, the design includes a nonrotating set of variable-pitch stator blades that act as flow recovery vanes. The design increases the fan-pressure ratio and reduces rotor loading, increasing airspeed. The fan stage is to be powered by a high-speed booster compressor and a high-speed, low-pressure-shaft-driven front gearbox. The engine is slated for certification as an "integrated engine" instead of a traditional "propeller/engine" because of its airframe integration complexity. CFM planned for an aerodynamically three-dimensional rotor with 12 woven carbon-fiber composite blades. Aided by a smaller engine core, the CFM RISE engine would have a bypass ratio of 75.

== Challenges ==
=== Blade design ===
Turboprops have an optimum speed below about 450 mph (390 kn; 720 km/h), because propellers lose efficiency at high speed, due to an effect known as wave drag that occurs just below supersonic speeds. This powerful drag has a sudden onset, and it led to the concept of a sound barrier when first encountered in the 1940s. This effect can happen whenever the propeller is spun fast enough that the blade tips approach the speed of sound.

The most effective way to address this problem is by adding blades to the propeller, allowing it to deliver more power at a lower rotational speed. This is why many World War II fighter designs started with two or three-blade propellers but by the end of the war were using up to five blades; as engines with more power were introduced, new propellers were needed to more efficiently convert that power. Adding blades makes the propeller harder to balance and maintain, and the additional blades cause minor performance penalties due to drag and efficiency issues. But even with these sorts of measures, eventually the forward speed of the plane combined with the rotational speed of the propeller blade tips (together known as the helical tip speed) will again result in wave drag problems.

Swept propeller

A method of decreasing wave drag was discovered by German researchers in 1935—sweeping the wing backwards. Today, almost all aircraft designed to fly much above 450 mph (390 kn; 720 km/h) use a swept wing. Since the inside of the propeller is moving slower in the rotational direction than the outside, the blade is progressively more swept back toward the outside, leading to a curved shape similar to a scimitar – a practice that was first used as far back as 1909, in the Chauvière two-bladed wood propeller used on the Blériot XI. (At the blade root, the blade is actually swept forward into the rotational direction, to counter the twisting that is generated by the backward swept blade tips.) The Hamilton Standard test propfan was swept progressively to a 39-degree maximum at the blade tips, allowing the propfan to produce thrust even though the blades had a helical tip speed of about Mach 1.15.

The blades of the GE36 UDF and the 578-DX had a maximum tip speed of about 750–800 ft/s (230–240 m/s; 510–550 mph; 820–880 km/h). This speed would be kept constant despite bigger or smaller propeller diameter by changing the maximum RPM.

Drag can also be reduced by making the blades thinner, which increases the speed that the blades can attain before the air ahead of them becomes compressible and causes shock waves. For example, the blades of the Hamilton Standard test propfan had a thickness-to-chord ratio that tapered from less than 20% at the spinner junction to 2% at the tips, and 4% at mid-span. Propfan blades had approximately half the thickness-to-chord ratio of the best conventional propeller blades of the era, thinned to razor-like sharpness at their edges, and weighed as little as 20 pounds (9.1 kg). (The GE36 UDF engine that was tested on the Boeing 727 had front and back blades that weighed 22.5 and 21.5 lb (10.2 and 9.8 kg) each.)

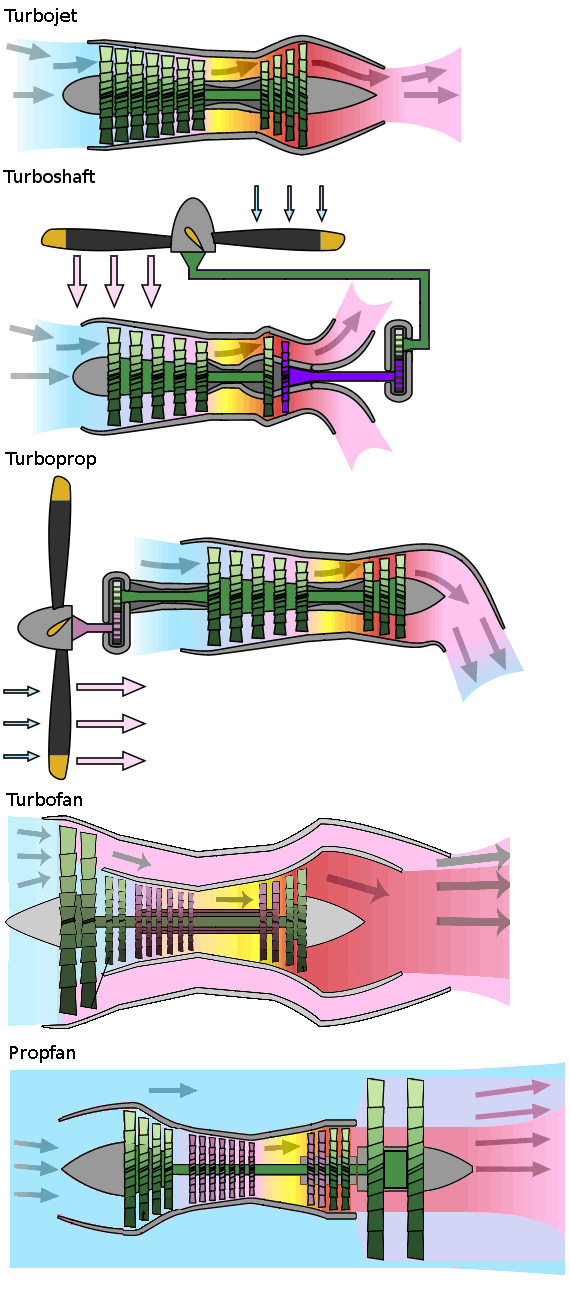
A comparison of the propfan with commercially proven types of aircraft engines

=== Noise ===
One of the major problems with the propfan is noise. General methods for reducing noise include lowering tip speeds and decreasing blade loading, or the amount of thrust per unit of blade surface area. A concept similar to wing loading, blade loading can be reduced by lowering the thrust requirement or by increasing the amount, width, and/or length of the blades. For contra-rotating propfans, which can be louder than turboprops or single-rotating propfans, noise can also be lowered by:

- increasing the gap between the propellers;
- keeping back propeller blade lengths shorter than those of the front propeller, so that the back propeller blades avoid cutting through the blade tip vortices of the front propeller (blade-vortex interaction);
- using different numbers of blades on the two propellers, to avoid acoustic reinforcement; and
- turning the front propeller and back propeller at different speeds, also to prevent acoustic reinforcement.

==== Community noise ====
Engine makers expect propfan implementations to meet community (as opposed to cabin) noise regulations without sacrificing the efficiency advantage. Some think that propfans can potentially cause less of a community impact than turbofans, given their lower rotational speeds. Geared propfans should have an advantage over ungeared propfans for the same reason.

In 2007, the Progress D-27 was modified to meet the United States Federal Aviation Administration (FAA) Stage 4 regulations, which correspond to International Civil Aviation Organization (ICAO) Chapter 4 standards and were adopted in 2006. A 2012 trade study by NASA projected that noise from existing open rotor technology would be 10–13 cumulative EPNdB quieter than the maximum noise level allowed by the Stage 4 regulations. The newer Stage 5 noise limits (which replaced the Stage 4 regulations for larger aircraft in 2018 and mirrored the ICAO Chapter 14 noise standard established in 2014) are more restrictive than the Stage 4 requirement by only seven cumulative EPNdB, so current propfan technology should not be hindered by the Stage 5 standards. (The term "cumulative" is used to combine takeoff lateral, takeoff flyover and approach EPNdB margins relative to certification noise levels.) The study also projected that at existing technology levels, open rotors would be nine percent more fuel-efficient but remain 10–12 cumulative EPNdB louder than future aircraft with advanced ultra-high bypass ratio turbofans. Snecma estimates from open-rotor tests that its propfan engines would have about the same noise levels as its CFM LEAP turbofan engine, which entered service in 2016.

Further reductions can be achieved by redesigning the aircraft structure to shield noise from the ground. For example, another study estimated that if propfan engines were used to power a hybrid wing body aircraft instead of a conventional tube-and-wing aircraft, noise levels could be reduced by as much as 38 cumulative EPNdB compared to ICAO Chapter 4 requirements. In 2007, the British budget airline easyJet introduced its ecoJet concept, a 150–250 seat aircraft with V-mounted open rotor engines joined to the rear fuselage and shielded by a U-tail. It unsuccessfully initiated discussions with Airbus, Boeing, and Rolls-Royce to produce the aircraft.

=== Size ===
A twin-engine aircraft carrying 100–150 passengers would require propfan diameters of 120–168 inches (300–430 cm; 10.0–14.0 ft; 3.0–4.3 m), and a propfan with a propeller diameter of 236 in (600 cm; 19.7 ft; 6.0 m) would theoretically produce almost 60,000 lbf (270 kN) of thrust. These sizes achieve the desired high bypass ratios of over 30, but they are approximately twice the diameter of turbofan engines of equivalent capability. For this reason, airframers usually design the empennage with a T-tail configuration in order to avoid the turbulent propwash adversely influencing the elevators and causing vibration issues therein. The propfans may be attached to the upper part of the rear fuselage. For the Rolls-Royce RB3011 propfan prototype, a pylon of about 8.3 ft (2.54 m; 100 in; 254 cm) long would be required to connect the center of each engine to the side of the fuselage. If the propfans are mounted to the wings, the wings would be attached to the aircraft in a high wing configuration, which allows for ground clearance without requiring excessively long landing gear. For the same amount of power or thrust produced, an unducted fan requires shorter blades than a geared propfan, although the overall installation issues still apply.

=== Output rating ===
Turboprops and most propfans are rated by the amount of shaft horsepower (shp) that they produce, as opposed to turbofans and the UDF propfan type, which are rated by the amount of thrust they put out. The rule of thumb is that at sea level with a static engine, 1 shaft horsepower (750 watts) is roughly equivalent of 2 pounds-force (8.9 N) thrust, but at cruise altitude, that changes to about 1 pound-force (4.4 N) thrust. That means two 25,000 lbf thrust (110 kN) engines can theoretically be replaced with a pair of 12,000–13,000 shaft hp (8,900–9,700 kW) propfans or with two 25,000 lbf thrust (110 kN) UDF propfans.

== List of propfans ==
- CFM International RISE
- General Electric GE36
- Kuznetsov NK-93
- Metrovick F.5
- Pratt & Whitney/Allison 578-DX
- Progress D-27
- Progress D-236
- Rolls-Royce RB3011

== Aircraft with propfans ==
- Antonov An-70

=== Proposed aircraft with propfans ===
- Antonov An-180
- ATRA-90
- Boeing 7J7
- Grumman MR1
- Grumman MR2
- Grumman VSTOL
- McDonnell Douglas MD-94X
- MPC 75
- Yakovlev Yak-44
- Yakovlev Yak-46

== See also ==
- Contra-rotating propellers
- Ducted fan
- Geared turbofan

== Bibliography ==
- Dubois, Thierry; Warwick, Graham (January 9–22, 2017). "Last of the CRORs: Safran is about to test a counter-rotating open rotor engine, despite waning appeal". Advanced Propulsion. Aviation Week & Space Technology. Vol. 179, no. 1. Lyon, France and Washington, D.C., USA. p. 54. OCLC 969306167.
- Kinney, Jeremy R. (2017). "4: The Quest for Propulsive Efficiency, 1976–1989" (PDF). The power for flight: NASA's contributions to aircraft propulsion. NASA aeronautics book series. Vol. 631. pp. 114–125. hdl:2060/20180003207. ISBN 9781626830370. OCLC 990183146. alternate url
- Notice of proposed amendment (NPA) 2015-22: Open rotor engine and installation (PDF), European Aviation Safety Agency, December 21, 2015, archived (PDF) from the original on August 25, 2018
- Khalid, S. Arif; Lurie, David; Breeze-Stringfellow, Andrew; Wood, Trevor; Ramakrishnan, Kishore; Paliath, Umesh; Wojno, John; Janardan, Bangalore; Goerig, Trevor; Opalski, Anthony; Barrett, Jack (May 2013). "FAA CLEEN program open rotor aeroacoustic technology non-proprietary report" (PDF). Federal Aviation Administration. General Electric. Archived (PDF) from the original on 8 July 2018.
- Coniglio, Sergio (February 2010). "Military aircraft propulsion: Jets vs. props". Military Technology (MILTECH). Vol. 34, no. 2. Mönch Publishing Group. pp. 77–84. ISSN 0722-3226. OCLC 527912380.
- Bowles, Mark (2010). "Advanced turboprops and laminar flow" (PDF). The Apollo of aeronautics: NASA's aircraft energy efficiency program, 1973-1987. NASA-SP. Vol. 2009–574. Washington, D.C.: National Aeronautics and Space Administration. pp. 122–136. hdl:2060/20110011568. ISBN 9780160842955. OCLC 465190382. alternate url
- Doyle, Andrew (October 6, 2009). "Open rotor: how does it work?". Flight International. London, England, UK. ISSN 0015-3710.
- Turner, Aimée (March 23, 2009). "Back to the windtunnel". Flight International. London, England, United Kingdom.
- "EU explores cleaner airplanes". Farnborough Air Show. AINonline. July 24, 2008.
- Bowles, Mark D.; Dawson, Virginia P. (1998). "Chapter 14: The advanced turboprop project: Radical innovation in a conservative environment". In Mack, Pamela (ed.). From engineering science to big science: The NACA and NASA Collier Trophy research project winners. NASA-SP. Vol. 4219. pp. 321–343. hdl:2060/20000012419. ISBN 978-0-16-049640-0. OCLC 757401658.
- Kuznetsov, N. D. (June 28–30, 1993). Propfan engines. Joint Propulsion Conference and Exhibit (29th ed.). Monterey, California, USA. doi:10.2514/6.1993-1981.
- Kuntz, H. L.; Gatineau, R. J.; Prydz, R. A.; Balena, F. J. (October 1991). Development and testing of cabin sidewall acoustic resonators for the reduction of cabin tone levels in propfan-powered aircraft (Report). hdl:2060/19920004539. OCLC 976747507. alternate url
- Kuntz, H. L.; Gatineau, R. J. (May 1991). Laboratory test and acoustic analysis of cabin treatment for Propfan Test Assessment aircraft (Report). OCLC 27904451. alternate url
- United States Environmental Protection Agency (EPA) (August 1990). Preliminary technology cost estimates of measures available to reduce U.S. greenhouse gas emissions by 2010 (Report). Attachment D: Memo from Michael Kavanaugh on UDF aircraft engine.
- Postlethwaite, Alan (April 18–24, 1990). "Opening doors: The Soviet aerospace industry is in transition as military cuts hit and its factories start producing consumer goods". Flight International. pp. 28–31.
- Little, B. H.; Poland, D. T.; Bartel, H. W.; Withers, C. C.; Brown, P. C. (July 1989). Propfan test assessment (PTA): Final project report. Vol. NASA-CR-185138. hdl:2060/19900002423. OCLC 891598373. alternate url
- Little, B. H.; Barrel, H. W.; Reddy, N. N.; Swift, G.; Withers, C. C.; Brown, P. C. (April 1989). Propfan test assessment (PTA): Flight test report. Vol. NASA-CR-182278. hdl:2060/19900002422. OCLC 57716217. alternate url
- "Douglas holds back on propfan launch" (PDF). Flight International. Vol. 134, no. 4127. August 20, 1988. p. 12.
- DeGeorge, C. L. (1988). Large-scale advanced prop-fan (LAP): Final report. Vol. NASA-CR-182112. hdl:2060/19880010922. OCLC 23092598. alternate url
- Hager, Roy V.; Vrabel, Deborah (1988). Advanced turboprop project. NASA SP-495. Lewis Research Center, Cleveland, Ohio: National Aeronautics and Space Administration (NASA) Scientific and Technical Information Division. hdl:2060/19890003194. OCLC 17508419. Archived (PDF) from the original on March 13, 2017. alternate url
- GE Aircraft Engines (December 1987). Full scale technology demonstration of a modern counterrotating unducted fan engine concept. Design report. hdl:2060/19900000732. OCLC 1013402936 – via Internet Archive. alternate url
- Donne, Michael (September 5, 1986). "The new aero-engines: A path to cheaper flight". Financial Times. Farnborough, England, United Kingdom. p. 20.
- Moxon, Julian (May 24, 1986). "After the big turbofans". Civil Propulsion. Flight International. Vol. 129, no. 4012. pp. 32, 34. ISSN 0015-3710.
- Skipp, Peter (December 14, 1985). "Tupolev and the new generation: Alexei Tupolev is looking ahead to a replacement for the Tu-154, the USSR's most widely-used short-to-medium-range jet airliner. He is also seeing into service a 154 derivative which will operate for many years to come". Flight International. pp. 30–31.
- Whitlow, J. B., Jr.; Sievers, G. K. (September 10–11, 1984). Fuel savings potential of the NASA advanced turboprop program. Aviation Fuel Conservation Symposium. Federal Aviation Administration (FAA). Washington, D. C., USA. hdl:2060/19840021809. OCLC 11694598. alternate url
- "Soviet designers look ahead". Flight International. February 13, 1982. p. 335.
- Moxon, Julian (January 16, 1982). "Propfan: The propeller to replace jets?". Flight International. Windsor Locks, Connecticut, USA. pp. 112–114. ISSN 0015-3710.
- Goldsmith, I. M. (February 1981). A study to define the research and technology requirements for advanced turbo/propfan transport aircraft. Vol. NASA-CR-166138. hdl:2060/19820010328. alternate url
