= McDonnell Douglas MD-94X =

Proposal for a propfan-powered airliner

MD-94X
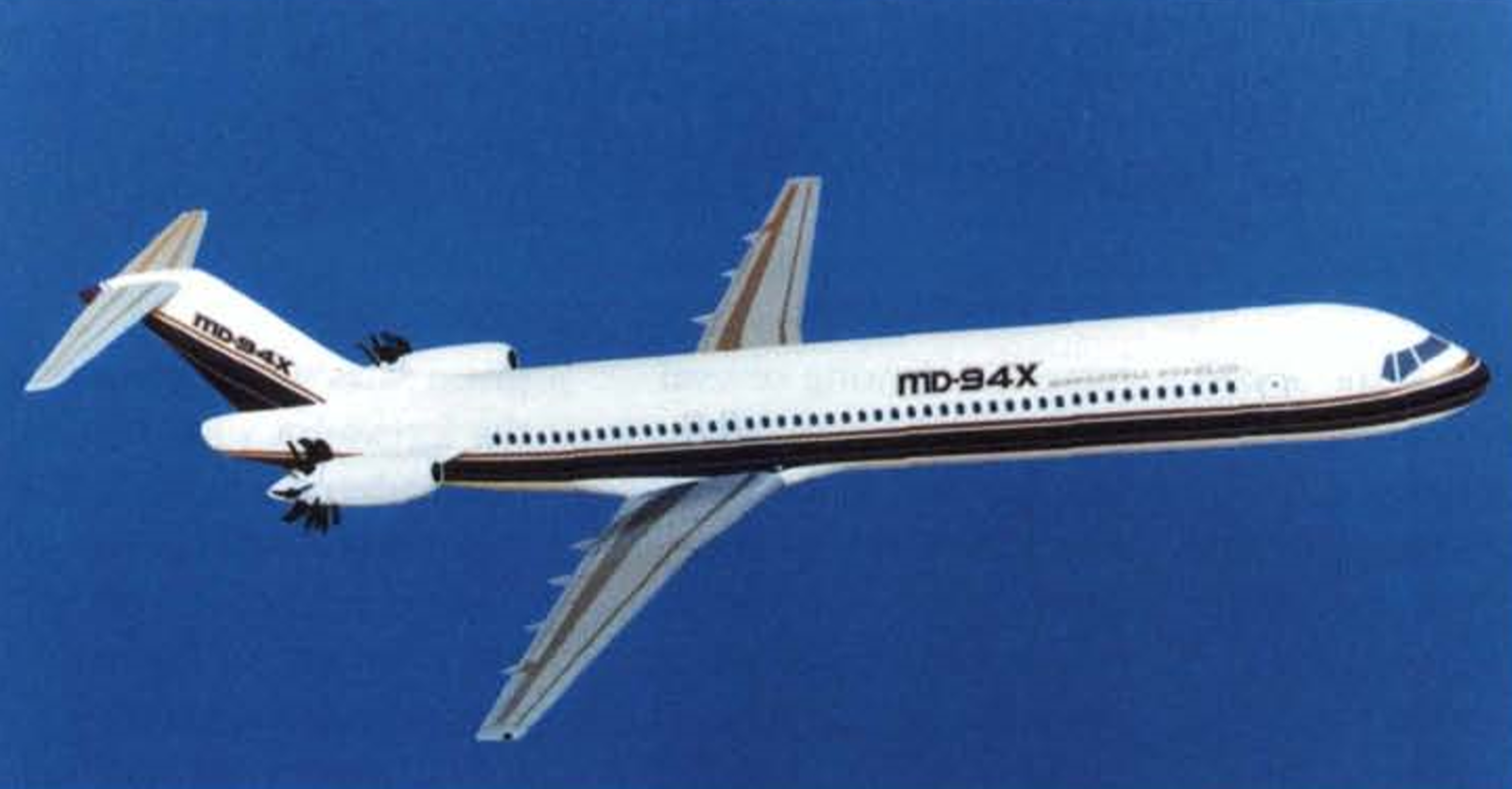
- A model of the proposed McDonnell Douglas MD-94X clean-sheet aircraft with two propfan engines

General information
- Type: Airliner
- National origin: United States
- Manufacturer: McDonnell Douglas
- Status: Canceled project
- Number built: None

History
- Developed from: McDonnell Douglas MD-80

The McDonnell Douglas MD-94X was a planned propfan-powered airliner, intended to begin production in 1994. Announced in January 1986, the aircraft was to seat between 160 and 180 passengers, possibly using a twin-aisle configuration. An all-new design that was investigated internally since at least 1984, the MD-94X was developed in the mid-1980s to compete with the similar Boeing 7J7. The price of oil would have to be at least US$1.40 per gallon for McDonnell Douglas to build the plane, though. Configuration was similar to the MD-80, but advanced technologies such as canard noseplanes, laminar and turbulent boundary layer control, side-stick flight control (via fiber optics), and aluminum-lithium alloy construction were under consideration. Airline interest in the brand-new propfan technology was weak despite claims of up to a 60% reduction in fuel use, and both aircraft were canceled.

Under development at the same time were two propfan-powered commercial variants of the MD-80. The "MD-91X" would have seated 100-110 and entered service in 1991. The "MD-92X," a 150-seat aircraft targeted for service entry in 1992, was originally to be a 76 in stretch (1.9 m) of the MD-80. The price per engine would have been an estimated US$ 1.6 million dollars more for the propfans than for the MD-80's Pratt & Whitney JT8D-200 series engines. Existing DC-9s and MD-80s would also have been eligible for an upgrade to the new propfan powerplants. On May 19, 1987, McDonnell Douglas tested General Electric Aviation's unducted fan (UDF) engine in flight for the first time on an MD-80 demonstrator, an aircraft that was restored after suffering an empennage separation in 1980 during the landing of a certification test flight for the DC-9 Super 80.

A propfan-powered military variant of the MD-87 or MD-91X, called the P-9D, was also proposed as an anti-submarine warfare (ASW) aircraft. The P-9D was intended for use in the United States Navy's Long Range Air ASW-Capable Aircraft (LRAACA) program, which was to initially replace the existing fleet of 125 Lockheed P-3 Orion aircraft. In October 1988, the Navy selected a derivative of the P-3 Orion (which was later renamed Lockheed P-7A) as the LRAACA aircraft over the P-9D.

On October 10, 1989, McDonnell Douglas publicly announced that it was abandoning the development of propfan-powered aircraft, due to airline companies concerns about the technology risk and cost compared to a conventionally-powered airliner.

== Specifications ==
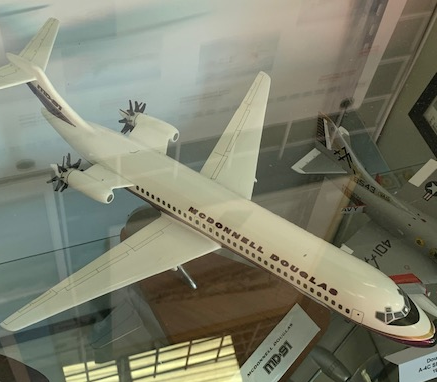
A desktop scaled model of the proposed McDonnell Douglas MD-91 propfan airliner.

Characteristics
Airplane	MD-91X	MD-92X	MD-94X	P-9D
Derived from	MD-87	MD-88	N/A (clean sheet)	MD-87 or MD-91X
Mixed-class seats	114	165		N/A
Sale price	US$25 million	>US$30 million		
Length	120 ft 11 in (36.86 m)	157 ft 4 in (47.96 m)		132 ft 2 in (40.3 m)
Operating empty weight	83,508 lb (37,879 kg)	91,579 lb (41,540 kg)		
MTOW	133,000 lb (60,000 kg)	155,000 lb (70,000 kg)		165,000 lb (75,000 kg)
Cruise speed	Mach 0.76			430 knots (490 mph; 800 km/h)
Range	2,563 nmi (2,949 mi; 4,747 km)	2,424 nmi (2,789 mi; 4,489 km)		2,000 nmi (2,300 mi; 3,700 km) (4-hour loitering time)
Takeoff field length	5,200 ft (1,600 m)	7,000 ft (2,100 m)		
Engines (×2)	General Electric GE36-C22 or PW-Allison 578	General Electric GE36-C25 or PW-Allison 578		General Electric GE36 or PW-Allison 578-D
Thrust per engine	22,000 lbf (98 kN)	25,000 lbf (110 kN)		25,000 lbf (110 kN)
Lower hold cargo volume	773 cu ft (21.9 m^{3})	1,250 cu ft (35 m^{3})		N/A

== See also ==
Related development

- McDonnell Douglas MD-90

Aircraft of comparable role, configuration, and era

- Antonov An-180
- Boeing 7J7
- MPC 75
- Tupolev Tu-334
- Yakovlev Yak-46

== Bibliography ==
- Worsham, Jim (August 30 – September 1, 1988). A vision of the future—The role of the jet airliner builders. Commercial aviation to the end of the century: Expansion in an era of accelerating change. London, England, UK: Financial Times Conference Organisation. Chapter 26. hdl:2027/mdp.39015025179980. OCLC 645843955.
- "Current, projected military aircraft programs reviewed" (PDF). Military: Federal Republic of Germany. West Europe. JPRS report. Translated by Foreign Broadcast Information Service (FBIS). Bonn, West Germany (published June 23, 1988). Wehrtechnik. May 1988. pp. 32–39. Archived (PDF) from the original on June 1, 2022.
- "McDonnell Douglas proposes modified MD-91 as Navy's next-generation ASW aircraft". Budget Control Dilemmas. Aviation Week & Space Technology. Vol. 128, no. 10. March 7, 1988. p. 18. ISSN 0005-2175.
- Dornheim, Michael A. (February 29, 1988). "McDonnell Douglas begins demonstrating UHB aircraft". Air Transport. Aviation Week & Space Technology. Long Beach, California, USA. pp. 66–67, 70, 73. ISSN 0005-2175.
- "Jane's all the world's aircraft supplement: December 1987". Air Force Magazine. Vol. 70, no. 12. Air Force Association (published December 1987). July 1987. p. 102. ISSN 0730-6784.
- "Market place" (PDF). Air Transport. Flight International. Vol. 132, no. 4072. July 25, 1987. p. 7. ISSN 0015-3710.
- Ott, James (July 6, 1987). "Midway's option on MD-91/92X represents gamble on fuel prices". Aviation Week & Space Technology. Vol. 127, no. 1. pp. 43, 47. ISSN 0005-2175.
- "Douglas prepares for propfan" (PDF). Air Transport. Flight International. Vol. 131, no. 4066. San Diego, California, USA. June 13, 1987. p. 41. ISSN 0015-3710.
- Learmount, David (May 2, 1987). "Boeing offers long-range 7J7" (PDF). World News. Flight International. Vol. 131, no. 4060. Seattle, Washington, USA. p. 2. ISSN 0015-3710.
- Page, M. A.; Ivey, D. M.; Welge, H. R. (October 1, 1986). Ultra high bypass engine applications to commercial and military aircraft. SAE Aerospace Technology Conference and Exposition. SAE Technical Papers. doi:10.4271/861720. ISSN 0148-7191.
- Mordoff, Keith F. (August 18, 1986). "Douglas studies MD-92X production". Aviation Week & Space Technology. Vol. 125, no. 7. pp. 33–34. ISSN 0005-2175.
- Mordoff, Keith F. (November 11, 1985). "Douglas plans continuing upgrades to maintain MD-80 competitiveness". International Air Transport. Aviation Week & Space Technology. Vol. 123. pp. 52, 54–57. ISSN 0005-2175.
- "MDC's propfan decisions" (PDF). Paris Report. Flight International. Vol. 127, no. 3963. June 8, 1985. p. 13. ISSN 0015-3710.
