= Tupolev Tu-330 =

Russian proposed military medium transport aircraft

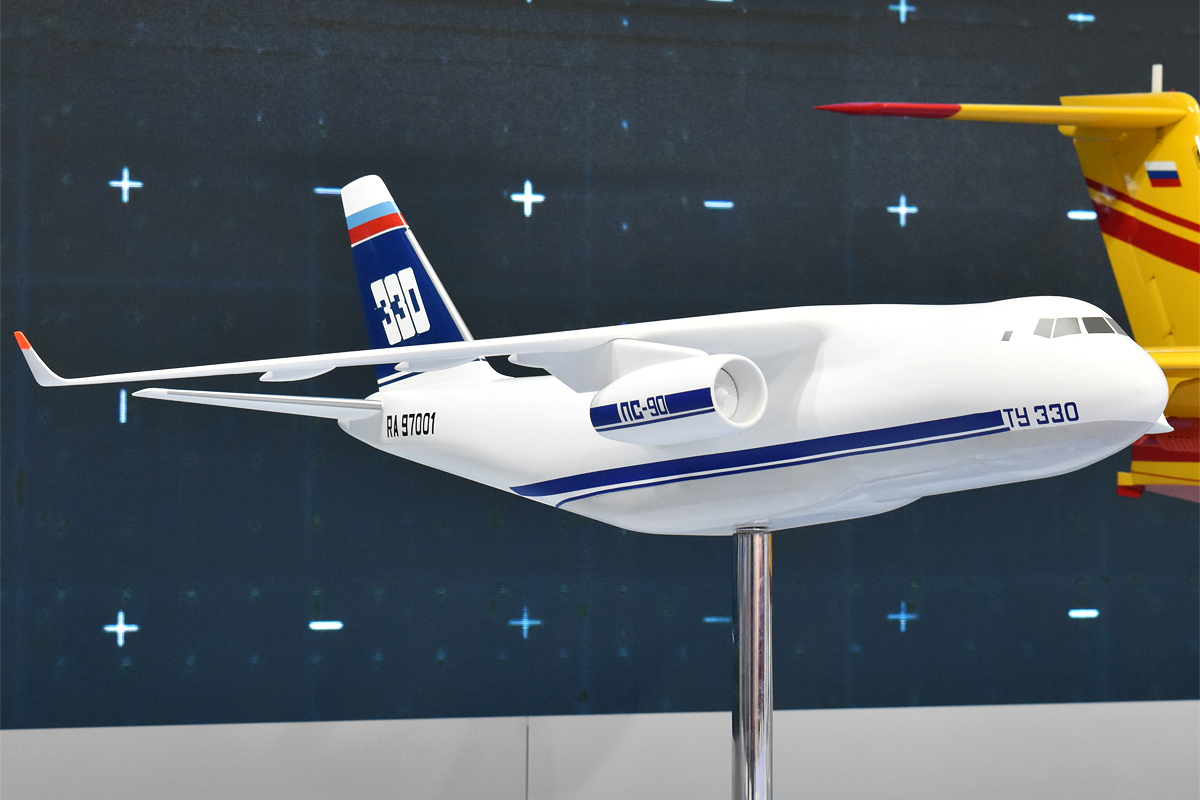
- Tu-330 model

General information
- Type: Transport aircraft
- National origin: Russia
- Manufacturer: Tupolev
- Number built: None

History
- Developed from: Tupolev Tu-204

The Tupolev Tu-330 was a proposed Russian medium-size transport aircraft developed by Tupolev since the early 1990s. The project was stopped around 2000s due to lack of funding and difficult economic situation of the Russian aircraft industry at the time.

== Design ==
The Tu-330 was to have a swept high-mounted wing design with two high-bypass ratio PS-90A engines mounted below the wings. An optional powerplant system has also been proposed, using NK-93 engines that can operate on LNG (liquefied natural gas) fuel. The aircraft was also designed for commonality with the Tu-204/Tu-214 civilian airliner series, in order to simplify production and minimize costs of manufacturing, maintenance and parts.

== Variants ==
In addition to Tu-330, the following variants were proposed:

Tu-330
Basic civilian cargo variant.
Tu-330PS
Search and rescue variant.
Tu-330P
Firefighting variant.
Tu-330RL
A variant designed for long-range reconnaissance flights.
Tu-330R
Communication relay aircraft.
Tu-330VT
Strategic/Tactical airlifter.
Tu-330SE
Sanitary and evacuation aircraft.
Tu-330TZ
Aerial refueling tanker.
Tu-330K (Tu-338)
A proposed liquid natural gas-fuelled variant with a Samara NK-94 engine.

== Specifications ==
Data from Jane's All the World's Aircraft 2008–2009

General characteristics

- Crew: two
- Length: 42.00 m (137 ft 9.5 in)
- Wingspan: 43.50 m (142 ft 8.5 in)
- Height: 14.00 m (45 ft 1.25 in)
- Wing area: 195.5 m^{2} (2,104 sq ft)
- Gross weight: 103,500 kg (228,175 lb)
- Useful lift: 35,000 kg (77,000 lb)
- Powerplant: 2 × Aviadvigatel PS-90A turbofans , 171 kN (38,400 lbf) thrust each

Performance

- Cruise speed: 850 km/h (530 mph, 460 kn)
- Range: 3,000 km (1,865 mi, 1,621 nmi)
- Service ceiling: 11,000 m (36,100 ft)
