= Kuznetsov NK-93 =

1980s Soviet propfan aircraft engine

NK-93
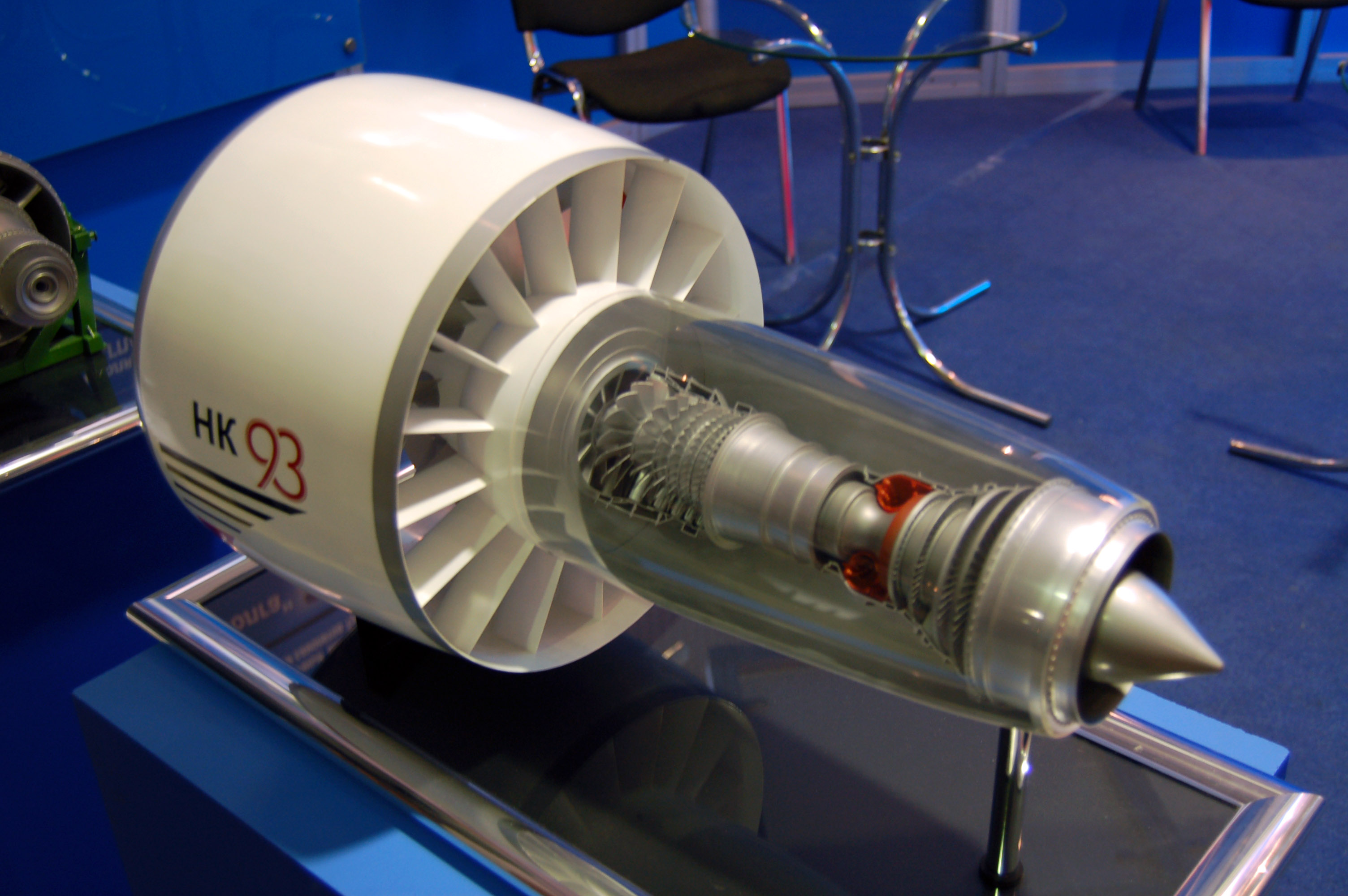
- NK-93 engine
- Type: Propfan
- National origin: Soviet Union
- Manufacturer: Kuznetsov Design Bureau
- First run: 1989
- Number built: 11
- Developed from: Kuznetsov NK-92

The Kuznetsov NK-93 was a civilian aircraft engine, a hybrid between a turbofan and a turboprop known as a propfan. The engine was also unique in having a separate duct around the contra-rotating propellers, as most other propfans are unducted. Once described in a respected aviation encyclopedia as "potentially the most fuel-efficient aircraft jet engine ever to be tested", the NK-93 was targeted for derivatives of Soviet/Russian airliners such as the Ilyushin Il-96, Tupolev Tu-204, and Tupolev Tu-330. Five in-flight engine tests were conducted on the NK-93 from December 2006 to December 2008.

== Development ==
The NK-93 engine was developed beginning in the late 1980s, although the design of the engine was allegedly envisioned as early as 1968. Many of the design features were adopted from the Kuznetsov NK-92, the military complement to the NK-93. The core of the NK-93 was to form the foundation of a family of direct-drive turbofans and geared propfans, ranging from 11,000 to 22,000 kilograms-force (24,000 to 49,000 pounds-force; 110 to 220 kilonewtons) in thrust. It was the last major project of Kuznetsov Design Bureau founder Nikolai Dmitriyevich Kuznetsov.

The NK-93 was originally scheduled for flight testing in late 1993/early 1994 and certification in 1997 so that it could be used on the Ilyushin Il-96M and Tupolev Tu-204M. By May 1994, seven full-size versions of the engine had been built, with five of them close to the production configuration. Due to the breakup of the Soviet Union, though, the schedule was repeatedly delayed because of severe funding shortages and other issues. However, by October 2001, a tenth NK-93 engine neared completion, out of a total of 15 planned engine prototypes.

The engine finally underwent flight testing on an Ilyushin Il-76LL testbed aircraft beginning on December 29, 2006, with a second flight occurring on May 3, 2007. A total of 50 flight test hours were planned. Testing was suspended again in June 2007 because of funding troubles. Airborne testing did not restart until October 2008, with flights on October 2 and 6. Another test flight occurred on December 15, 2008, but the NK-93 was removed from the testbed by May 14, 2009.

Supporters of the NK-93 claim that the amount of money needed to certify the engine is minuscule compared to the development costs of competing new Russian engines, which they regard as still inferior to the older NK-93.

In April 2014, Kuznetsov announced that it would resume work on the NK-93 engine.

=== Foreign interest ===
The advanced nature of the engine attracted the attention of airframers and engine manufacturers in other countries. By 1992, the NK-93 was already drawing interest from the Japanese aviation industry. Investors from South Korea were among the groups discussing investment in the NK-93 at the 2001 MAKS air show. In 2004, Airbus and the Kuznetsov Design Bureau studied the feasibility of using the engine to power Airbus commercial aircraft. German engine maker MTU Aero Engines purchased a Kuznetsov report on the noise characteristics of the NK-93 engine for 600,000 Deutsche marks. When the NK-93 was displayed on the Il-76LL demonstrator at the 2007 MAKS air show, Chinese aircraft manufacturers reportedly made a "tempting offer" to buy all of the NK-93's blueprints and documentation. In October 2013, the European Commission gave a three-and-a-half-year grant to study the Innovative Counter rOtating fan system for high Bypass Ratio Aircraft engine (COBRA). COBRA was a European Union-Russia cooperative program to study an ultra-high bypass ratio (UHBR) counter-rotating turbofan (CRTF) that was similar to the NK-93. Participating organizations included Kuznetsov, CIAM, Russian propeller manufacturer Aerosila, French engine maker Safran (Snecma), the French aerospace laboratory (ONERA), and the German Aerospace Center (DLR).

== Design ==
The NK-93 has a core that was developed from the NK-110, an unducted Kuznetsov propfan that was never built. Its Aerosila SV-92 contra-rotating propellers are 2,900 millimetres (114 in) in diameter, have eight blades on the front propeller and ten blades on the back propeller. The engine has a rated thrust of 18,000 kgf (39,700 lbf; 177 kN), a maximum thrust of 20,000 kgf (45,000 lbf; 200 kN), a cruise SFC of 0.49 kg/(kgf⋅h), and a takeoff SFC of 0.234 kg/(kgf⋅h). 13% of the thrust is produced directly by the gas generator, while the rest of the thrust is produced through the turning of the ducted fans. The front and back fans are both variable-pitch propellers; by 1993, the coaxial fans could combine to produce 85% of the desired 4,000 kgf (8,800 lbf; 39 kN) maximum reverse thrust, and by 1995, the reverse thrust capability was 3,800 kgf (8,300 lbf; 37 kN). The engine has a bypass ratio of 17 and is designed around a 22,000 kW (30,000 hp) planetary gearbox with seven satellites.

== Applications ==
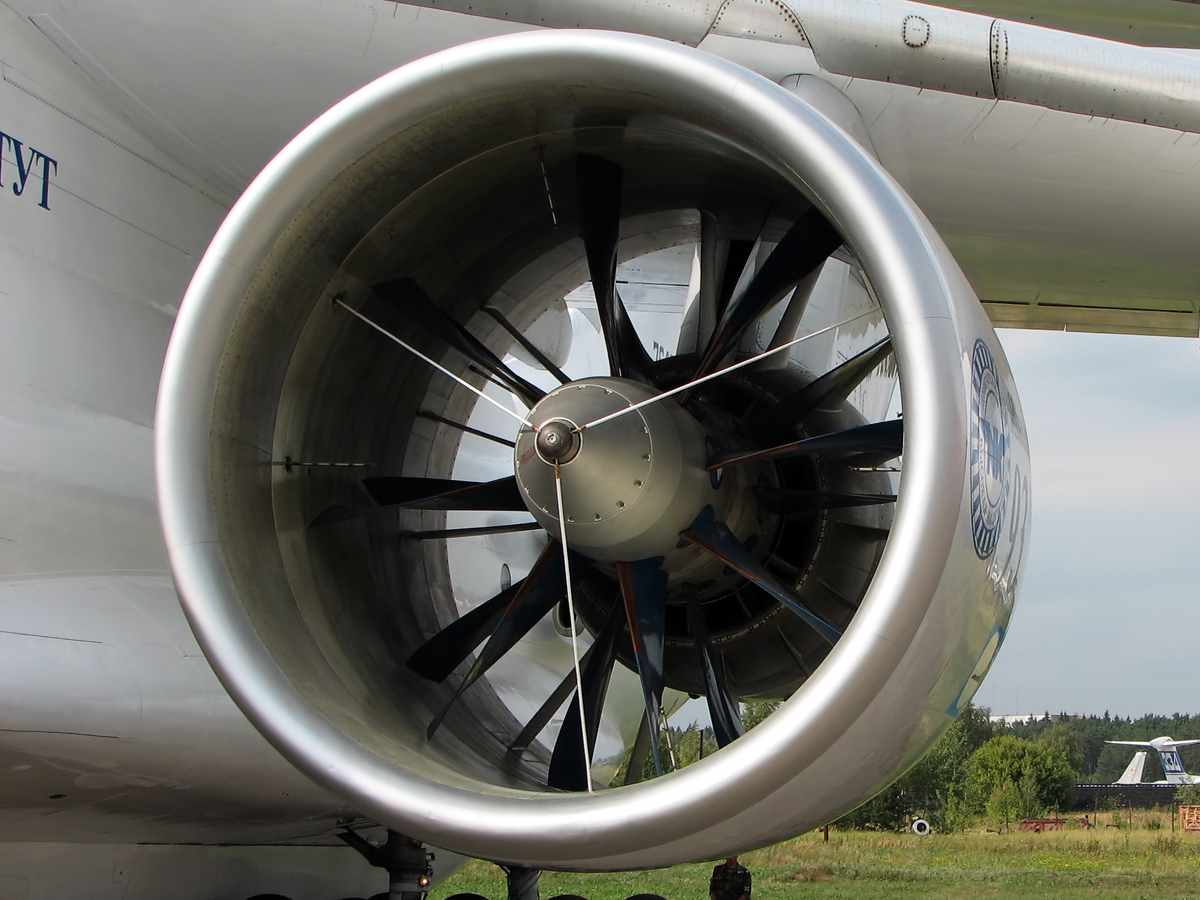
The Kuznetsov NK-93 ducted propfan mounted on an Ilyushin Il-76LL testbed aircraft at the MAKS 2007 air show.

- Antonov An-70 (proposed twin-engine version)
- Antonov An-124 (proposed re-engine)
- Ilyushin Il-76LL (testbed)
- Ilyushin Il-96
- Sukhoi KR-860
- Tupolev Tu-154M3
- Tupolev Tu-204
- Tupolev Tu-330

== Specifications ==
==== General characteristics ====
- Type: 3-shaft ducted propfan, with the 8-blade front fan absorbing 40% of the power and the 10-blade back fan absorbing 60% of the power
- Length: 5.972 m (19.59 ft; 597.2 cm; 235.1 in)
- Width:
- Height:
- Propeller diameter: 2.9 m (9.5 ft; 290 cm; 110 in)
- Diameter:
- Dry weight: 3,650 kg (8,050 lb)
- Propeller weight: 1,000 kg (2,200 lb)

==== Components ====
- Compressor: 7-stage axial low-pressure compressor; 8-stage high-pressure compressor
- Combustors: annular
- Turbine: 1-stage high-pressure turbine, 1-stage low-pressure turbine, 3-stage propfan turbine

==== Performance ====
- Maximum thrust: 18,000 kgf (40,000 lbf; 180 kN)
- Overall pressure ratio: 37
- Bypass ratio: 16.6
- Air mass flow: 976 kg/s (2,150 lb/s)
- Turbine inlet temperature: 1,700 °C (3,090 °F)
- Specific fuel consumption: Takeoff: 6.6 g/(kN⋅s) (0.234 lb/(lbf⋅h)); Cruise: 14 g/(kN⋅s) (0.49 lb/(lbf⋅h)) at Mach 0.75, 14.7 g/(kN⋅s) (0.520 lb/(lbf⋅h)) at Mach 0.8

== See also ==
- Geared turbofan
- Propfan

Related development

- Kuznetsov NK-12
- Kuznetsov NK-92

Comparable engines

- Europrop TP400
- General Electric GE36
- IAE SuperFan
- Pratt & Whitney/Allison 578-DX
- Progress D-27 / Progress D-627
- Progress D-236
- Rolls-Royce RB3011

Related lists

- List of aircraft engines

== Bibliography ==
- Leonov, Vladimir (June 22, 2011). "Nikolay Kuznetsov – A celebration with tears in the eyes". Argumenty Nedeli (Arguments of the Week). Translated by Cochrun, Roy.
- Kozlov, Dmitry (January 14, 2008). "Предлагается закрыть тему создания авиадвигателя НК-93 после проведения его летных испытаний" [It is proposed to close the creation of the NK-93 aircraft engine after conducting its flight tests]. AviaPort.ru (in Russian). Archived from the original on December 19, 2016.
- Kingsley-Jones, Max (September 10, 2007). "Deliveries of Russia's NK-93 ducted fan could begin in 2009". Flight International. ISSN 0015-3710.
- "Flight tests of NK-93 aircraft engine have begun at the Gromov Flight Research Institute". Roy's Russian Aircraft Resource.
  - В ЖУКОВСКОМ НАЧАЛИСЬ ИСПЫТАНИЯ АВИАДВИГАТЕЛЯ НК-93. AviaPort. TASS. May 3, 2007.
- Fomin, Andrey (April 2007). "Начинаются летные испытания НК-93" [Flight tests of NK-93 begin] (PDF). промышленность - коротко (Industry - briefs). Взлёт: Национальный аэрокосмический журнал (Take-off: National aerospace magazine) (in Russian). No. 28. p. 15. ISSN 1819-1754.
- Fomin, Andrey (May 2006). "НК-93 готовится к полетам на летающей лаборатории" [NK-93 prepares for flights in a flying laboratory] (PDF). ДВИГАТЕЛИ 2006 - коротко (ENGINES 2006 - briefs). Взлёт: Национальный аэрокосмический журнал (Take-off: National aerospace magazine) (in Russian). No. 17. p. 6. ISSN 1819-1754.
- "Second NK-93 aircraft engine sent from Samara to Zhukovskiy for tests". Translated by Cochrun, Roy. February 27, 2006.
- Zrelov, V. A. (2002). Отечественные ГТД. Основные параметры и конструктивные схемы (Часть 2) [Domestic engines. Basic parameters and construction diagrams. Study guide (Part 2)] (PDF) (Report) (in Russian). Samara State Aerospace University. ISBN 5-7883-0210-2. OCLC 1020674498.
- Taverna, Michael (June 1994). "Russian engine industry in turmoil". Interavia. Vol. 49, no. 579. Aerospace Media Publishing. pp. 26+. ISSN 1423-3215.
- Casamayou, Jean-Pierre (May 30 – June 5, 1994). "France: Proposed engine for FLA would use SNECMA M88 core". West Europe: Aerospace. Science & technology: Europe/International (Report). JPRS Report. Translated by Foreign Broadcast Information Service (FBIS). Paris, France (published July 8, 1994). Air & Cosmos/Aviation International. pp. 6–7. hdl:2027/nyp.33433016823886.
- Fulton, Kenneth (April 30, 1992). "Ex-Soviet engine industry at crossroads --- Raw material, desire exist for joint ventures, but structure and capital are scarce". Space. Aerospace Propulsion. Vol. 3, no. 9. McGraw-Hill. p. 5. ISSN 1050-5245 – via Factiva.
- Kuznetsov, N. D. (June 28–30, 1993). "Propfan engines". 29th Joint Propulsion Conference and Exhibit. Joint Propulsion Conference and Exhibit (29th ed.). Monterey, California, USA. doi:10.2514/6.1993-1981.
