= ATRA-90 =

Propfan-powered regional aircraft proposal

The Advanced Technology Regional Aircraft 90 (ATRA-90) was a propfan-powered regional aircraft that was proposed in 1986. Conceived by Industri Pesawat Terbang Nusantara (IPTN) of Indonesia, the multi-national project was also backed by Boeing of the United States, Fokker of the Netherlands, and Messerschmitt-Bölkow-Blohm (MBB) of West Germany. The ATRA-90 was targeted for introduction between 1992 and 1995, but the project was put on hold in 1988.

== Design ==
The aircraft was designed to transport between 83 and 115 passengers a distance of 1,500–2,100 nautical miles (2,800–3,900 kilometers; 1,700–2,400 miles). It would cruise at a speed of Mach 0.8 and an altitude of 9,100 meters (30,000 feet).

== Bibliography ==
- Graf, Pieter (16 June 1987). "Fokker head on joint endeavors, company strategy". Science & technology: Europe & Latin America. JPRS Report. Rotterdam, Netherlands (published 28 August 1987). NRC Handelsblad. pp. 20–22.
- "IPTN: Indonesia's aircraft manufacturer continues to diversify" (DjVu). ICAO bulletin: Official magazine of international civil aviation. Vol. 44, no. 8. August 1989. pp. 10–11. ISSN 0018-8778.
  - "ICAO Journal". International Civil Aviation Organization.
