= Rolls-Royce RB3011 =

Propfan engine

RB3011
- Type: Propfan
- Manufacturer: Rolls-Royce plc

The Rolls-Royce RB3011 (previously designated RB2011) is a prototype propfan engine from Rolls-Royce plc. The design is also known as an "open rotor" engine.

== Design and development ==
The RB3011 is designed for the 180–300 passenger aircraft (e.g. Boeing 737 or Airbus A320). The RB3011 was renamed from RB2011, because Rolls-Royce employees kept confusing the 2011 with the expected service entry date. Rolls-Royce bought the Allison Engine Company in 1995, and has studied the Pratt & Whitney/Allison 578-DX propfan engine built in the 1980s.

The engine has two contra-rotating rotors (fans) on the outside of the engine nacelle, either at the front of the assembly ("tractor") or at the rear ("pusher"). Both pusher and tractor open rotor designs form part of Rolls-Royce's long-term "15-50" vision, which is examining various architectures to tackle the 150 seat-aircraft market. Within 15-50 group – named for specific fuel consumption reductions of 15–50% compared with current generation engines – there are various options based on technology availability and maturity.

The open rotor design is known to have increased noise compared to normal turbofan engines, where noise is contained by the engine duct. The forward rotor is larger in diameter than the rear rotor, to avoid problems with eddies from the forward rotor tips. The rotors are powered by the engine shaft via an epicyclic gearbox. The rotors produce a large amount of heat.

In late 2008, the RB3011 was considered a contender for the powerplant of the Irkut MS-21. Rolls-Royce felt it could develop and certify the engine before the aircraft's planned (at the time) certification in the first quarter of 2015.

The engine has been tested at the Aircraft Research Association in Bedford, Bedfordshire. Wind-tunnel testing has taken place at DNW in Marknesse in the Netherlands.

It was hoped to reduce the fuel consumption of an aircraft, compared to those with normal turbofan engines, by up to 30%. This was the main reason for choosing this design of engine. Certification was planned for 2017–2018, with market entry with airlines planned by 2020.

== See also ==
- Europrop TP400
- Kuznetsov NK-12
- Kuznetsov NK-93

Comparable engines

- General Electric GE36
- Progress D-27
- Progress D-236
- Pratt & Whitney/Allison 578-DX

Related lists

- List of aircraft engines
