= Pratt & Whitney/Allison 578-DX =

Experimental aircraft engine

Model 578-DX
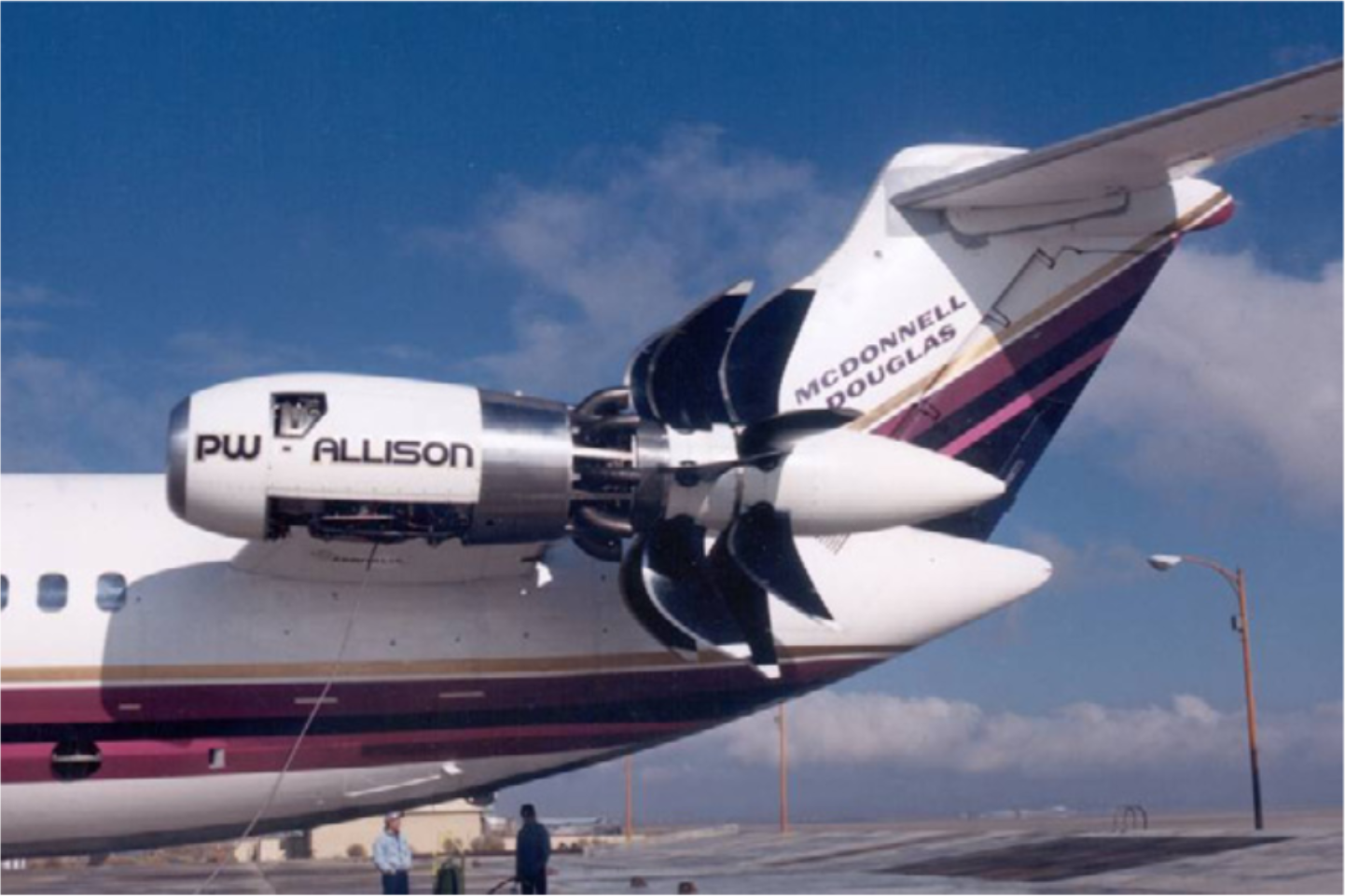
- The PW-Allison Model 578-DX geared propfan demonstrator.
- Type: Propfan
- National origin: United States
- Manufacturer: Pratt & Whitney / Allison Engine Company
- First run: Mid-1987
- Major applications: Boeing 7J7 (proposed); McDonnell Douglas MD-91, MD-92, and MD-94X
- Number built: 2 demonstrators
- Developed from: Allison T701 / Allison 501-M62B

The Pratt & Whitney/Allison 578-DX was an experimental aircraft engine, a hybrid between a turbofan and a turboprop known as a propfan. The engine was designed in the 1980s to power proposed propfan aircraft such as the Boeing 7J7 and the MD-91 and MD-92 derivatives of the McDonnell Douglas MD-80. As of 2019, it is still one of only four different contra-rotating propfan engines to have flown in service or in flight testing.

== Development ==
The Allison Engine Company, a division of automobile manufacturer General Motors (GM), unveiled its Model 578 contra-rotating propfan engine at the Paris Air Show in mid-1985. The engine represented Allison's attempt to re-enter the commercial airline engine market, because after turboprop aircraft were overtaken in civil aviation in the 1950s and 1960s, Allison was mostly confined to selling military aircraft engines. Targeted to power passenger airliners seating between 100 and 160 passengers, the engine would be based on the core of the Allison T701 heavy lift helicopter turboshaft engine, which first ran in 1975. The engine would come in two sizes: a 10,000 shaft horsepower (7,500 kilowatts) variant with a 23:1 compression ratio and a three-stage boost compressor and power turbine added to the T701 core, and a 16,000 shaft hp (12,000 kW) variant with a 33:1 pressure ratio and a four-stage boost and power section. Since Allison estimated that a 100-seat plane required two 9,000–10,000 shaft hp (6,700–7,500 kW) engines and that a 150-seat plane needed two 13,000–15,000 shaft hp (9,700–11,200 kW) engines, the two sizes chosen should handle the 100–160 passenger aircraft market. Allison hoped to have its 578 engine ready for flight tests in late 1987.

=== Joint venture ===
Allison and United Technologies aircraft engine division Pratt & Whitney announced on March 14, 1986 that they would develop the engine as a joint venture. The agreement, which was signed on February 25, was reached because Pratt & Whitney would not be able to develop its own propfan engine by the planned 1992 certification date of the 7J7, and because it also did not have an engine core in the size range of 10,000–16,000 shaft hp (7,500–11,900 kW). Allison would develop the engine and perform ground testing, while Pratt & Whitney would integrate the propulsion system into the aircraft and manage the flight test program.

On February 23, 1987 in Detroit, Michigan, Pratt & Whitney and Allison officially formed a joint company named PW–Allison Engines. The new company claimed that compared a commercial jet engine, its propfan engines would consume 30-percent less fuel, require shorter runway lengths during takeoffs and landings, and be quieter (because of the slower propfan rotational speeds enabled by the 578's gearbox). The partnership would last 20 years and cover geared propfan development in the 8,200–16,000 shaft hp (6,100–11,900 kW) range, though the power range could be increased by 15 percent with a specific mechanical modification. The new company also expected Japanese and European engine makers to eventually join its program instead of creating competing propfan engines. PW–Allison Engines was to invest at least 500 million dollars to bring the engine into commercial production (depending on airline commitments to buy aircraft using its engines), and it assumed that the new company would take half of the market for new medium-sized airliners over the next ten years—a 13-to-18 billion dollar market, it estimated. Pratt & Whitney would handle the marketing to commercial customers, while Allison would do the marketing to military customers. Other members of the new company included GM subsidiaries Hughes Aircraft and Delco Electronics and United Technologies subsidiary Hamilton Standard, the propeller manufacturer that invented the propfan concept with the National Aeronautics and Space Administration (NASA) in the 1970s.

=== Boeing 7J7 ===
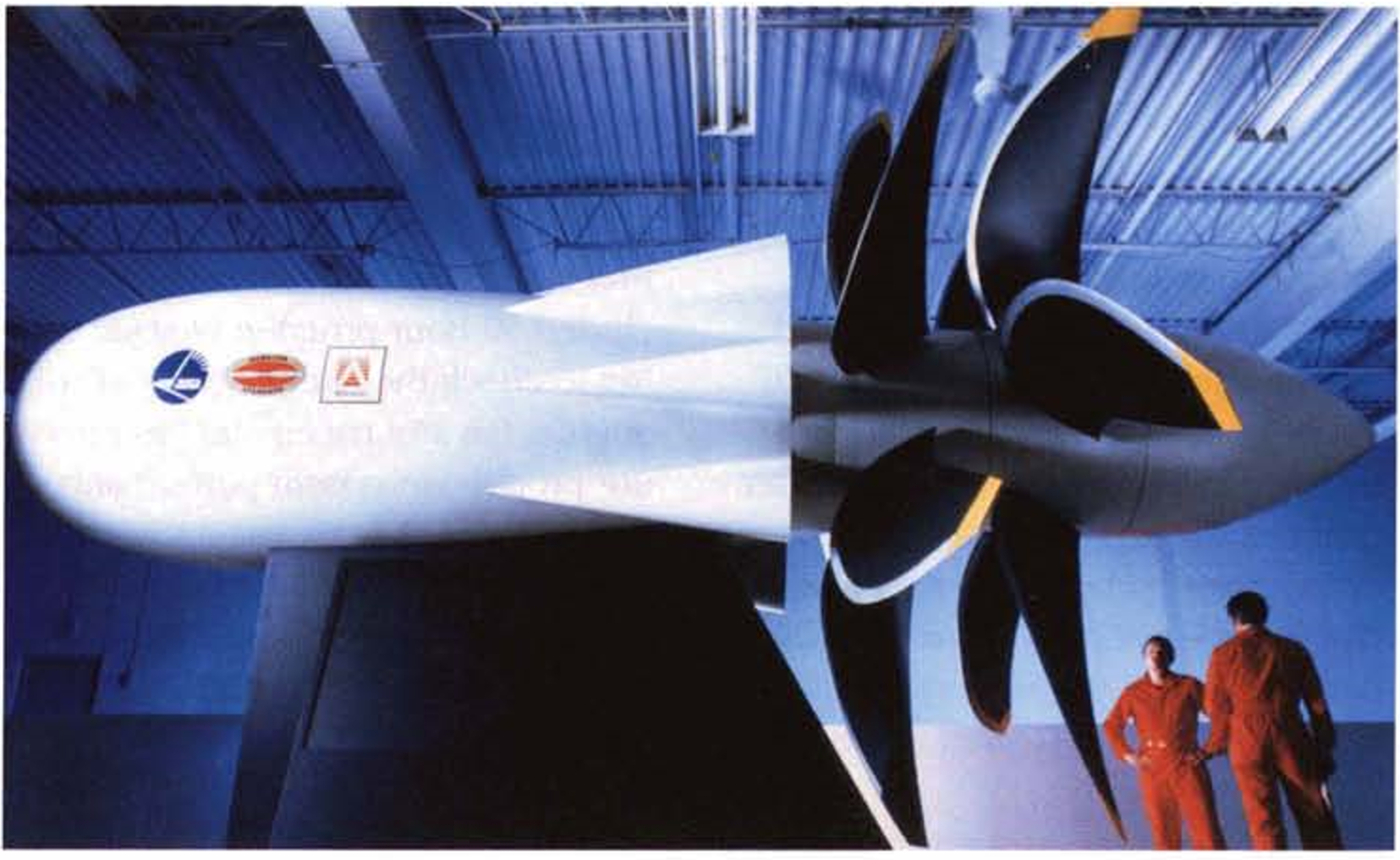
An early version of the Pratt & Whitney/Allison 578-DX demonstrator engine, intended to power propfan-powered aircraft such as the Boeing 7J7 and the McDonnell Douglas MD-91

On December 20, 1985, Boeing and Allison agreed to test its new propfan engine for use on the Boeing 7J7. As of early 1986, Allison maintained that it could have its propfan engine certified by early 1990, although a few months later the company changed the certification target timeline to 1992. By early/mid 1987, Boeing had rejected using the PW–Allison engine for its 7J7. Although Boeing had not tested PW–Allison's propfan in flight, the airframer said that the PW–Allison engine's off-the-shelf core was not powerful enough to power the 150-seat plane. PW–Allison vigorously objected, claiming its engine's gearbox could handle 13,000 shaft hp (9,700 kW), the agreement between Pratt & Whitney and Allison covered up to 16,000 shaft hp (12,000 kW), and the gearbox design could go to 25,000 shaft hp (19,000 kW). The decision became moot in December 1987, when Boeing indefinitely suspended development of the 7J7 aircraft, four months after delaying the 7J7 availability date from 1992 to 1993.

=== McDonnell Douglas MD-91X/MD-92X ===
In January 1986, Allison also signed a memorandum of understanding with McDonnell Douglas to perform flight tests on the Allison demonstrator engine, now known as the 578-DX, on an MD-80 testbed in late 1987. The flight test program was in preparation for McDonnell Douglas's ultra-high bypass (UHB) MD-91X derivative, a 114-seat airliner that had a planned service entry in the early 1990s. The demonstrator engine would convert 10,400 shaft hp (7,800 kW) into 19,000 pounds-force (85 kilonewtons) of thrust. One engine would be built for ground testing, while another would be used in flight tests. The 578-DX would follow in testing the competing General Electric GE36 UDF engine, which was scheduled for 75 hours of flight tests on the MD-80 testbed from May 1987 through August 1987; the 578-DX would complete its 75 hours of flight testing from December 1987 through February 1988. During the middle of each engine's test program, McDonnell Douglas would let airline representatives fly in the testbed aircraft to assess the passenger experience. McDonnell Douglas would begin installing one 578-DX demonstrator on its testbed in September 1987, while PW-Allison would perform ground tests with its other 578-DX demonstrator from mid-June 1987 to November 1987. Ground testing was to begin around August 1987, and PW–Allison was confident that its engine would be flight tested by early December.

A number of issues hindered the 578-DX, though. First, there was difficulty in manufacturing the thin, swept blades. Then, after one test engine was disassembled for inspection, the second engine ingested parts of the first engine into its compressor during testing. These problems delayed flight tests until the end of February 1988, and they delayed ground testing of the engine until December 19, 1987. In February 1988, PW–Allison postponed the service entry date until the end of 1993 at the earliest, as it said that the 578-DX was not powerful enough for the MD-92, and the required increase in engine power from 14,000 to 16,000 shaft hp (10,000 to 12,000 kW) could not be finished in time for the McDonnell Douglas's 1992 target date. PW–Allison moved the beginning of flight tests to May 1988, but the flight date target was missed again because of endurance problems from the electrical pitch-change motors, so flight testing was put off until August to October of 1988.

Amidst the flight test delays, McDonnell Douglas repeatedly expressed dismay that PW–Allison had not made a formal offer to place its engines into an MD-90 production program. The airframer wanted to offer its proposed derivatives to airlines with a choice of powerplant options, instead of advertising aircraft availability with just the competing GE36 UDF engine. However, PW–Allison refused to submit an offering to McDonnell Douglas and the airlines before its flight tests were completed and evaluated.

Ground tests for the 578-DX finished on August 10, 1988 after almost 2,500 hours of runs, resulting in a successful preliminary flight rating test (PFRT), which cleared the way for flight testing. However, the 578-DX could not undergo flight tests until early 1989, because the GE36 demonstrator had been reinstalled on the MD-80 testbed for additional tests. The 578-DX was shipped off for testbed installation on October 18, 1988, and it was installed on the MD-80 testbed in November 1988. The testbed then performed ground runs and taxi tests at Edwards Air Force Base, with the first flight scheduled for January 1989. More delays occurred, though, including one during preparation for a planned March 12, 1989 first flight that was caused by an abrasion on the gearbox's bearing separator.

Nearly a year and a half after the flight test was originally planned, the 578-DX engine finally flew on April 13, 1989. The engine powered the MD-80 testbed from Edwards for one hour and 40 minutes, reaching an altitude of 15,000 ft (4,600 m) and a top speed of 239 kn (275 mph; 443 km/h). The first five flights were described as performing "flawlessly" through nearly the whole flight envelope. At the time, the 578-DX demonstration program was planning to conduct 50 hours of flight tests over the upcoming three to four months. The demonstrator covered a flight envelope of up to Mach 0.77 and up to an altitude of 30,000 ft (9,100 m), with one flight attaining an indicated airspeed (IAS) of 340 knots (390 mph; 630 km/h) at an altitude of 22,000 feet (6,700 m), or over Mach 0.8. However, the 578-DX testbed aircraft ended up flying only through May 1989, making 14 test flights for a total of just 20 hours.

Due to the absence of firm propfan orders, McDonnell Douglas announced in May 1989 that the V2500 turbofan engine from International Aero Engines (a multinational engine consortium that included Pratt & Whitney as a member) would be provided as a powerplant option for the MD-90 series. In September 1989, with the order drought continuing, McDonnell Douglas decided to offer the MD-90 series exclusively with the V2500 turbofan engine, ending the airliner sales prospects for the PW–Allison 578-DX propfan. Allison acknowledged that the higher price of its propfan, which some estimated to have a cost of US$4 million (or 40 percent higher than existing turbofan engines), would be unattractive to airline customers at the low fuel prices of the time. It also said that it would not perform any more flight tests of its propfan, preferring to study the data from the flight tests previously done on the MD-80.

=== Military proposals ===
Allison's engine was also being examined by the military for airlift and reconnaissance aircraft, and it was offered unsuccessfully for some military aircraft applications. As of early 1988, the Allison 578-D engine was the base powerplant for the Future International Military/Civil Airlifter (FIMA) consortium, which intended to build a replacement military transport aircraft for the Lockheed C-130 Hercules and the French-German Transall C-160 for American and western European military airfleets. The FIMA engine would be smaller than the demonstrator engine, as its contra-rotating propellers would have only four blades in front and four blades in back, and it would generate 8,800 hp (6,600 kW). The aircraft would fly at Mach 0.72 and operate from 2,000 to 3,000 ft (610 to 910 m) runway strips.

== Design ==
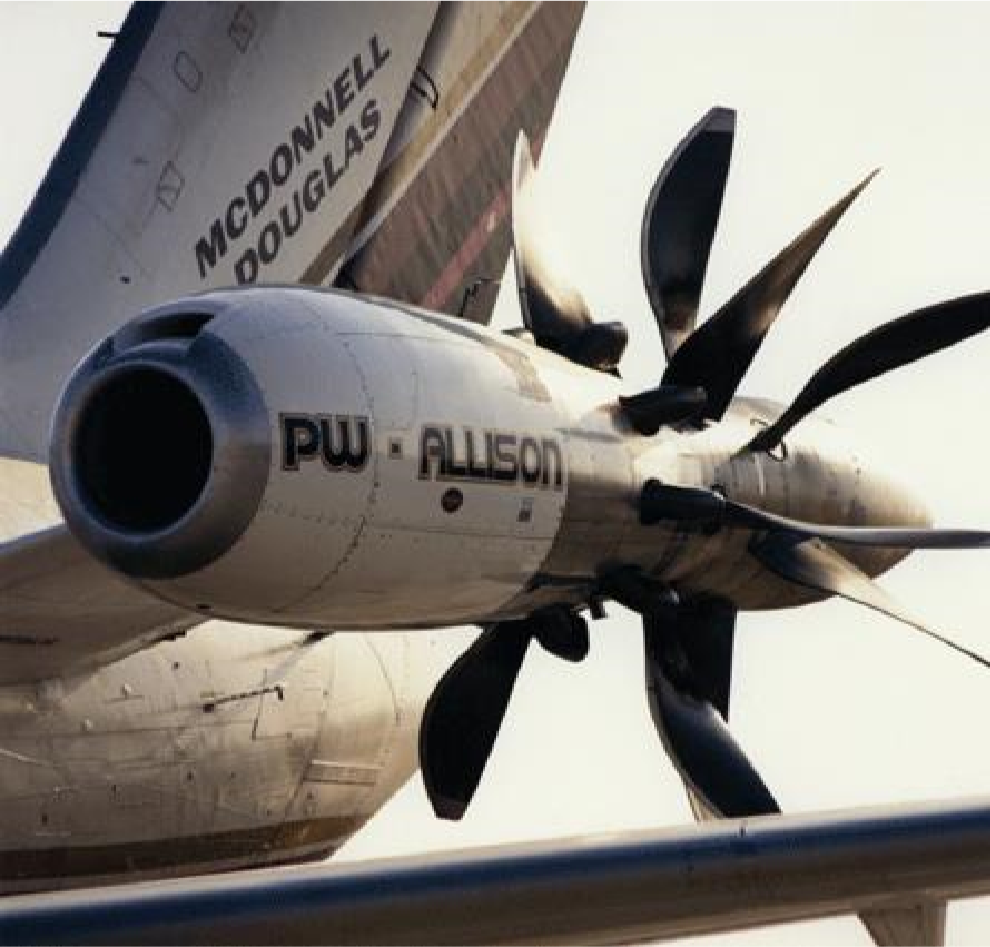
A closeup of the PW–Allison 578-DX propfan demonstrator, installed on the port side of a McDonnell Douglas MD-80 testbed

The propfan engine had 11.6 ft diameter (3.5 m; 139 in; 350 cm) coaxial contra-rotating propellers, with the front and back propellers (supplied by Hamilton Standard) each containing six blades of 4.35 ft (1.33 m; 52.2 in; 133 cm) in length. The propellers had a recommended tip speed of 750 feet per second (230 metres per second; 510 miles per hour; 820 kilometres per hour), and the engine could support a maximum aircraft flight speed of Mach 0.80–0.82. 44 percent of the engine's torque would be handled by the front propeller, while the other 56 percent would be absorbed by the back propeller. The hot gas exhaust contributes just 2–3 percent of the total thrust. The 578-DX engine was longer and thinner than the competing GE36 UDF engine.

=== Origin ===
The design adopted many aspects of the Allison 501-M78 single-rotation propfan engine, a single-rotation, 9 ft diameter (2.7 m; 110 in; 270 cm) powerplant being prepared for flight testing on a Gulfstream II business jet. The 501-M78 was an experimental engine that Allison was developing since 1984 as part of the NASA Propfan Test Assessment (PTA). It was a variant of the Allison T701 heavy lift helicopter turboshaft engine, which produced 8,079 shp (6,025 kW) and was also known as the Allison 501-M62B. The T701 was to power the Boeing Vertol XCH-62 helicopter, but after the XCH-62 was abandoned, the engine technology was redirected in 1976 toward an industrial gas turbine, which debuted in 1979 as the Allison 570-K. The 578-DX was derived from the Allison 571, a variant of the Allison 570 that entered service in 1985. There was much commonality in the participants of both engines: in addition to Allison supplying both of the engine cores, the PTA engine also used propellers designed by Hamilton Standard, and both the 501-M78 and the 578-DX had nacelles built by Rohr Industries. This arrangement facilitated the technology transfer from the 501-M78 to the 578-DX. In addition, the blades and the coaxial propellers on the 578-DX were inspired by the SR-7 single-rotation fan on the 501-M78 and the NASA-studied CRP-X1, a 2 ft contra-rotating (0.61 m; 24 in; 61 cm) model propfan with a 5x5 blade configuration.

=== Gearbox ===
Unlike the GE36, the 578-DX was fairly conventional, having a reduction gearbox between the low-pressure turbine and the propfan blades, which was thought to give a fuel efficiency advantage of 7 percent against the GE36, according to McDonnell Douglas. Allison, which developed the gearbox, claimed a fuel savings of 10 percent and the elimination of 1,000 turbine blades. The demonstrator engines produced 10,400 horsepower (7,800 kilowatts), generating a thrust of 21,000 pounds-force (93 kilonewtons). The gearbox would have a reduction ratio of 8.33 to 1, and it would be in service to an airline for 30,000 flight hours (ten years) before requiring a major overhaul, which bettered the mean time between removals (MTBR) of 8,000 flight hours for the Allison T56 turboprop, Allison's top-performing gearbox. The new gearbox, which the propfan developers said had only 15 major parts and was technologically simple, would provide accessory access without having to remove the engine or gearbox, since half of the removals on the T56 historically were caused by failures of accessories. Instead of the six accessory drives used on the T56, the PW-Allison propfan would have no more than two accessory drives. The design was also aided by a study funded by NASA and Allison to develop a 13,000 shaft hp (9,700 kW) contra-rotating gearbox.

=== Variants ===
Pratt & Whitney and Allison planned to offer their propfan in three different production models: the 578-D, which produced 11,800 hp (8,800 kW), climbed at an overall pressure ratio (OPR) of 23.4, and had a combustor exit temperature (CET) of 2,230 °F (1,220 °C; 2,690 °R; 1,490 K); the 578-E, a 13,500 hp (10,100 kW) model with a climb OPR of 31.3 and a CET of 2,390 °F (1,310 °C; 2,850 °R; 1,580 K); and the 578-F, the most powerful engine at 16,000 hp (12,000 kW), climbing at OPR 31.3 and with a CET of 2,535 °F (1,391 °C; 2,995 °R; 1,664 K). The 578-DX demonstrator engine did not completely reflect the design of the planned production models. For example, the 578-DX expels its hot exhaust gases forward of the propfan blades, initially requiring the use of heat-resistant blade materials to withstand the 500 °F (260 °C) exhaust stream, but the production engine design was modified to release the gases at the back of the engine to prevent the blades from heating up.

== Engines on display ==
The 578-DX demonstrator engines are on public display at the following museums:

- Pratt & Whitney Hangar/Museum, East Hartford, Connecticut
- Rolls-Royce Heritage Trust, Allison Branch, Indianapolis, Indiana

== Specifications ==
==== General characteristics ====
- Type: Two-shaft, geared pusher-configuration propfan
- Length:
- Diameter: 11 ft 7 in (3.54 m; 139 in; 354 cm)
- Dry weight:

==== Components ====
- Compressor: Low pressure compressor with 3 stages (578-D/DX) or 4 stages (578-E/F), 13-stage high-pressure compressor
- Turbine: 2-stage high pressure turbine, low-pressure turbine with 3 stages (578-D/DX) or 4 stages (578-E/F)
- Fuel type: Aviation kerosene to MIL-F-5624E / JP-4 / JP-5

==== Performance ====
- Maximum thrust: 22,000 lbf (98 kN)
- Overall pressure ratio: 23.4 for the 578-D; 31.3 for the 578-E/F
- Bypass ratio: 56
- Turbine inlet temperature: 578-D, 578-E, and 578-F: 2,230, 2,390, and 2,535 °F (1,221, 1,310, and 1,391 °C), respectively

== See also ==
- Europrop TP400
- Kuznetsov NK-12
- Kuznetsov NK-93

Related development

- PW–Allison 501-M80E

Comparable engines

- General Electric GE36
- Progress D-27
- Progress D-236
- Rolls-Royce RB3011

Related lists

- List of aircraft engines

== Bibliography ==
- Donoghue, J. A.; Moorman, Robert W.; Reed, Arthur; Woolsey, James P. (July 1989). "Soviets dominate transport displays". Air Transport World. pp. 26+.
- Koenig, Bill (October 4, 1988). "A dynamic future: Allison Gas Turbine looks to expand markets". Business Extra. Indianapolis Star. p. C–1, C–5. ISSN 1930-2533 – via Newspapers.com.
- Howe, D. C.; Sundt, C. V.; McKibbon, A. H. (October 1988). Advanced gearbox technology: Advanced counter-rotating gearbox: Detailed design report, Aug. 1984 - Jan. 1987 (PDF) (Report). United Technologies Corporation, Pratt & Whitney. hdl:2060/19940005945. OCLC 1052948385 – via NASA. alternate url
- Chapman, D. C.; Godston, J.; Smith, D. E. (July 11–13, 1988). "Testing of the 578-DX propfan propulsion system". 24th Joint Propulsion Conference. Joint Propulsion Conference (24th ed.). Boston, Massachusetts, USA. doi:10.2514/6.1988-2804.
- Hager, Roy V.; Vrabel, Deborah (1988). Advanced turboprop project. NASA SP-495. Lewis Research Center, Cleveland, Ohio: National Aeronautics and Space Administration (NASA) Scientific and Technical Information Division. hdl:2060/19890003194. OCLC 17508419. Archived (PDF) from the original on March 13, 2017. alternate url
- "Engines under test" (PDF). Propulsion. Flight International. Vol. 132, no. 4083. October 10, 1987. p. 20. ISSN 0015-3710.
- "MDC studies propfan ASW" (PDF). Defence. Flight International. Vol. 132, no. 4076. Long Beach, California, USA. August 22, 1987. p. 8. ISSN 0015-3710.
- Anderson, N. E.; Cedoz, R. W.; Salama, E. E.; Wagner, D. A. (June 1987). Advanced gearbox technology: Final report (PDF) (Report). Allison Gas Turbine Division, General Motors Corporation. hdl:2060/19900014958. OCLC 60652153 – via NASA. alternate url
- Donne, Michael (February 25, 1987). "Pratt & Whitney prop-fan deal" (PDF). World Trade News. Financial Times. No. 30169. p. 4. ISSN 0307-1766.
- "Allison propfan delayed". Propulsion. Flight International. Vol. 130, no. 4042. Indianapolis, Indiana, USA. December 20, 1986. pp. 64–65. ISSN 0015-3710.
- Donne, Michael (January 29, 1986). "Airbus to step up world sales campaign". World Trade News. Financial Times. No. 29841. p. 5. ISSN 0307-1766.
- DeMeis, Richard (October 1985). Frisch, Bruce (ed.). "Propfans gear up". Designer's Notebook. Aerospace America. p. 22. ISSN 0740-722X.
- Anderson, R. D. (July 1985). Advanced propfan engine technology (APET) definition study, single and counter-rotation gearbox/pitch change mechanism design (PDF) (Report). Allison Gas Turbine Division, General Motors Corporation. hdl:2060/19870019121. OCLC 24834544 – via NASA. alternate url
- Reynolds, C. N. (July 1985). Advanced Prop-fan Engine Technology (APET) single- and counter-rotation gearbox/pitch change mechanism: Final report (volume 1) (PDF) (Report). United Technologies Corporation, Pratt & Whitney Engineering Division. hdl:2060/19870019119. OCLC 24833372 – via NASA. alternate url
- Reynolds, C. N. (July 1985). Advanced Prop-fan Engine Technology (APET) single- and counter-rotation gearbox/pitch change mechanism: Final report (volume 2) (PDF) (Report). United Technologies Corporation, Pratt & Whitney Engineering Division. hdl:2060/19870019123. OCLC 24833372 – via NASA. alternate url
