= CFM International =

Franco-American aerospace manufacturer

- Type: Joint venture
- Industry: Aerospace
- Founded: 1974; 52 years ago
- Headquarters: Evendale (Cincinnati), Ohio, United States
- Key people: Gaël Méheust (CEO)
- Products: CFM International CFM56; CFM International LEAP
- Parent: GE Aerospace (50%); Safran Aircraft Engines (50%)
- Website: cfmaeroengines.com

CFM International is a Franco-American aircraft engine manufacturer. The company is a joint venture between GE Aerospace and Safran Aircraft Engines (formerly known as Snecma) and is headquartered in Cincinnati, Ohio. It was founded in 1974 to build and support the CFM56 series of turbofan engines. CFM is the world's largest commercial aircraft engine manufacturer, with a 39% market share as of 2020. It has delivered more than 37,500 of its engines to more than 570 operators. The name CFM is derived from the two parent companies' commercial engine designations: GE's CF series and Snecma's M series.

== History ==
While General Electric's military engine business for fighter jets was undeniably booming, the American company's ambitions were struggling to materialise in the civil sector. It was not until the late 1950s that GE made its first foray into this market.

On the other side, Snecma has been thinking since the mid-1960s about the best strategy for approaching the civil market with a new engine offering major performance gains in terms of fuel consumption and noise reduction, characteristics increasingly sought after by aircraft manufacturers and airlines.

In 1969, General Electric and Snecma began working together for the first time. Together with the German company MTU (Motoren-und-Turbinen-Union), the two companies produced parts for the CF6-50 engine powering the Airbus A300.

At the same time, and since the mid-1960s, Snecma began conducting a series of thermodynamic, aerodynamic and acoustic studies to establish the main characteristics of the M56 engine. Several objectives were set: low noise level, minimal fuel consumption, reduced maintenance and overall operating costs.

At the same time, the French government drew up its sixth five-year plan, defining the country's economic and industrial objectives for the period 1971-1975. The objectives of the French Aerospace Industry Committee converged with those of Snecma. The company and the government were well aware that the successful development of a 10-ton civil jet engine required international cooperation, for three main reasons. First, although Snecma was capable of developing advanced technologies, it lacked experience, particularly in the development of high-pressure turbines. It didn’t master the technology of variable stators, nor that of small fixed and mobile blades, required for the final high-load stages of the high-pressure compressor. Secondly, domestic sources of supply for high-temperature alloys and foundry and machining technologies for cooled high-pressure turbine blades were limited. Finally, as a specialist in military aircraft, Snecma had neither the sales organization nor the international presence needed to compete in the civil sector.

In 1971, Snecma was looking for a partner to develop, manufacture and sell the future CFM56 engine. The difficulties encountered by the Pratt & Whitney and Rolls Royce development programs quickly left General Electric as the only viable partner. A delegation comprising Snecma Chairman Jacques-Edouard Lamy, Sales Director Jean Crépin and Technical Director Michel Garnier travelled to Lynn, Massachusetts, in April 1970 to meet GE representatives. Gerhard Neumann (head of GE's Aircraft Engine Business Group) understood the scope of this new strategic opportunity in Europe and agreed to a 50/50 partnership.

== Creating CFM International ==
On 24 January 1974, as part of the development of the CFM56, Snecma and General Electric signed the final agreement governing the proposed joint venture. Although the company was already up and running, a number of legal and administrative formalities delayed its legal incorporation until September 1974. Named CFM International, this company under French law, with capital of 400,000 francs, created in equal shares by Snecma and General Electric, was responsible for managing the program and marketing the engines.

CFM's first CEO, Jean Sollier, chaired a ten-member board of directors, five from GE and five from Snecma, including two vice-presidents, Neumann and Ravaud. The two companies share design, development and production equally. Final assembly, sales and services are handled by each partner using its own resources.

The logo concept proposed by Jean Sollier, a mix of Snecma's red rectangle and GE's blue circle, and the engine name, which combines GE's civil engine nomenclature (CF for Commercial Fan) and Snecma's project name (M56), clearly illustrate the two companies' desire to work together.

== Initial trials and certification ==
On 20 June 1974, the demonstration engine for the CFM56 program ran for the first time at Evendale on a test bench belonging to General Electric. In the days that followed, and in less than ten hours of operation, it reached its full take-off thrust of 10 tonnes. In November of the same year, the CFM56 carried out its first trial on a test bench at Villaroche.

Boeing was one of the first aircraft manufacturers to realise the full potential of the CFM56 engine. Boeing president Thornton Wilson contacted Neumann and Ravaud in 1977 with a proposal for an agreement to replace the engines of the 707 using the CFM56.

On 17 March 1977, flight testing of the CFM56 began on the Caravelle flying testbench. The first flight took place at Mérignac, near Bordeaux. It lasted just over three hours and was designed to assess the performance of the engine and nacelle. In January 1979, ground and flight tests reached a total of more than 4,000 hours.

Five years after the creation of the company, and eight years after the start of the project, any contract had yet to be signed by aircraft manufacturers. The French government threatened to put the programme on hold if no commercial application was found before spring 1979. In the United States, United Airlines finally decided in March 1979 to choose the CFM56 to replace the engines of the DC-8 cargo aircraft.

On 8 November 1979, the CFM56 was certified for a nominal thrust of 24,000 lb simultaneously by the DGAC (Direction Générale de l'Aviation Civile) in France and the FAA (Federal Aviation Administration) in the United States. For the first time an engine has been certified jointly by the US agency and a European national agency. The CFM56 can now power commercial transport aircraft.

The CFM56 made its first commercial flight in April 1982 on a DC-8 Super 70 for Delta Air Lines, on a route between Atlanta and Savannah, Georgia. In February 1987, Snecma achieved its initial goal of becoming a benchmark engine manufacturer for the new European twinjet, with the maiden flight of the CFM56-5-powered A320. In 1991, the 5,000th CFM56 was delivered to Airbus Industrie. The 10,000th CFM56 was delivered at the 1999 Paris Air Show.

== Engines ==
- CFM International CFM56
- CFM International LEAP
- CFM International RISE (in development)

== Production ==
In December 1995, the Aerospace Industries Association listed 4,474 CFM engines in service, representing 12% of the installed base in the world's civil transport aircraft fleet.

In 2016, CFM delivered 1,665 CFM56 and 77 LEAP, and booked 2,677 orders : 876 CFM56 and 1,801 LEAP for US$36 billion at list price. The LEAP engine backlog exceeded 12,200 which was valued at more than US$170 billion at list price.

In 2017, CFM delivered 1,900 engines including 459 LEAPs, of which it plans to deliver 1,200 in 2018, 1,800 in 2019 and more than 2,000 in 2020. In 2019, CFM deliveries stood at 2,127 : 1,736 Leaps and 391 CFM56s (-63%), and plans to produce 1,400 engines in 2020.

Due to the impact of the COVID-19 pandemic on aviation, deliveries of LEAP engines across the first nine months of 2020 fell to 622 from 1,316 in the same period in 2019, and 123 CFM56 against 327, while LEAP fleet cycles were down 15% year-on-year and CFM cycles were 48% lower.

CFM announced the RISE project in June 2021, with plans to enter service in the mid 2030s.

In July 2026, IndiGo signed a memorandum of understanding with CFM for more than 1,000 LEAP-1A engines to power over 510 Airbus A320neo family aircraft. It was described as the largest single order for LEAP engines, and the agreement also provided for CFM to support the establishment of an IndiGo engine maintenance, repair and overhaul facility in India.

== The future of CFM ==
In the early 2000s, CFM launched a new cutting-edge technology programme: LEAP (Leading Edge Aviation Propulsion). The first LEAP began ground testing at GE's Peebles (Ohio) facility in September 2013, then at Snecma’s plant in Villaroche the following year. The LEAP-1C is the first of the family to begin flight testing on a modified GE Boeing 747-100.

In 2021, the CFM International partnership has been renewed until 2050 and extended to include services.
