= Rolls-Royce Trent =

Family of turbofan aircraft engines

Trent
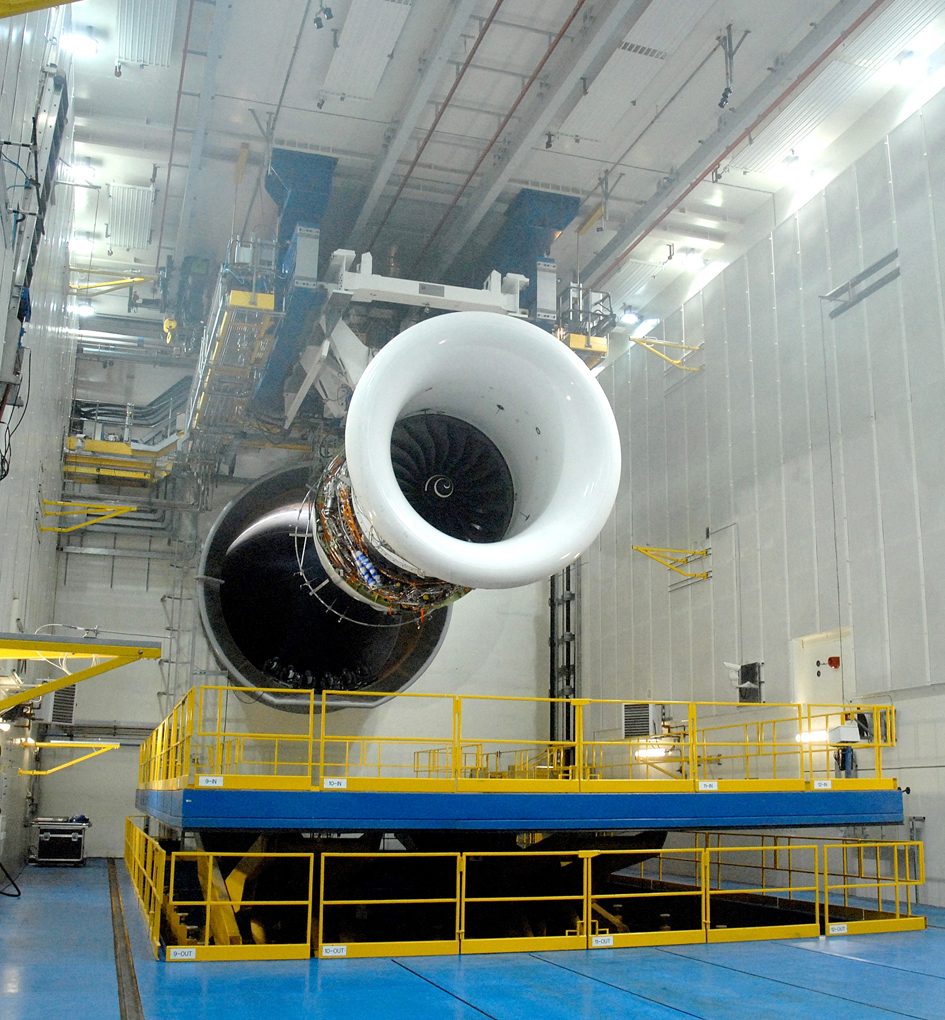
- A Trent 1000 turbofan engine installed on a test bench at the Rolls-Royce Test Facility in Derby, UK.
- Type: Turbofan
- National origin: United Kingdom
- Manufacturer: Rolls-Royce Holdings
- First run: 27 August 1990
- Major applications: Airbus A330; Airbus A340-500; Airbus A340-600; Airbus A350; Airbus A380; Boeing 777; Boeing 787
- Developed from: Rolls-Royce RB211
- Developed into: Rolls-Royce MT30
- Variants: Rolls-Royce Trent 500; Rolls-Royce Trent 700; Rolls-Royce Trent 800; Rolls-Royce Trent 900; Rolls-Royce Trent 1000; Rolls-Royce Trent XWB; Rolls-Royce Trent 7000

The Rolls-Royce Trent is a family of high-bypass turbofans produced by Rolls-Royce. It continues the three spool architecture of the 1972 RB211 with a maximum thrust ranging from 61,900 to 97,000 lbf (275 to 431 kN). Launched as the RB-211-524L in June 1988, the prototype first ran in August 1990. Its first variant is the Trent 700 introduced on the Airbus A330 in March 1995, then the Trent 800 for the Boeing 777 (1996), the Trent 500 for the A340 (2002), the Trent 900 for the A380 (2007), the Trent 1000 for the Boeing 787 (2011), the Trent XWB for the A350 (2015), and the Trent 7000 for the A330neo (2018). It also has marine and industrial variants such as the RR MT30.

== Development ==
Despite the success of the RB211, Rolls-Royce's share of the large civil turbofan market was only 8% when it was privatised in April 1987, the market being dominated by General Electric and Pratt & Whitney. In June 1987, Rolls-Royce was studying whether to launch a 65,000 lbf (290 kN) thrust variant of the RB211, to be called the RB211-700, for the Airbus A330 twin-jet, the long-range Boeing 767 and the MD-11, derived from the 747-400's -524D4D, with growth potential to 70,000 lbf (310 kN). By June 1988, Rolls-Royce was investing over $540 million to develop the uprated RB-211-524L with a new 95 in (240 cm) fan (up from 86 in (220 cm)) for the -524G/H and a fourth LP turbine stage up from three, targeting 65,000 to 70,000 lbf (290 to 310 kN).

At the September 1988 Farnborough Airshow, the 65,000–72,000 lbf (290–320 kN) -524L development was confirmed, estimated at £300 million, to power the MD-11 and A330 as a full-scale model was unveiled by Frank Whittle. In June 1989, the RB211-524L Trent was confirmed for the A330, rated at 74,000 lbf (330 kN). Rated at 65,000 lbf (290 kN) for the MD-11, the Trent made its first run on 27 August 1990 in Derby. By September 1992, the 94.6 in (240 cm) Trent 600 for the MD-11 was abandoned and prototypes were rebuilt as Trent 700 engines for the A330 with a 97.4 in (247 cm) fan.

The UK government granted Rolls-Royce £450 million of repayable launch investment, repaid with interest, to develop the RB.211 engine and the Trent family up to the Trent 900. Rolls-Royce obtained £200 million for the Trent 8104, 500 and 600 variants in 1997, and £250 million for the Trent 600 and 900 variants in 2001.

New proposed planes required higher thrust and customers wanted the Boeing 777 and Airbus A330 twinjets to fly Extended-range Twin-engine Operations at introduction. Rolls-Royce decided to offer an engine for every large civil airliner, based on a common core to lower development costs, and the three-shaft design provided flexibility, allowing each spool to be individually scaled. In keeping with Rolls-Royce's tradition of naming its jet engines after rivers, the engine family is named after the River Trent in the Midlands of England, a name previously used for the RB.50, Rolls-Royce's first working turboprop engine; and the 1960s RB.203, a 9,980 lbf (44.4 kN) bypass turbofan and the first three-spool engine, designed to replace the Spey but never introduced.

In 2019, Rolls-Royce delivered 510 Trent engines.

== Design ==
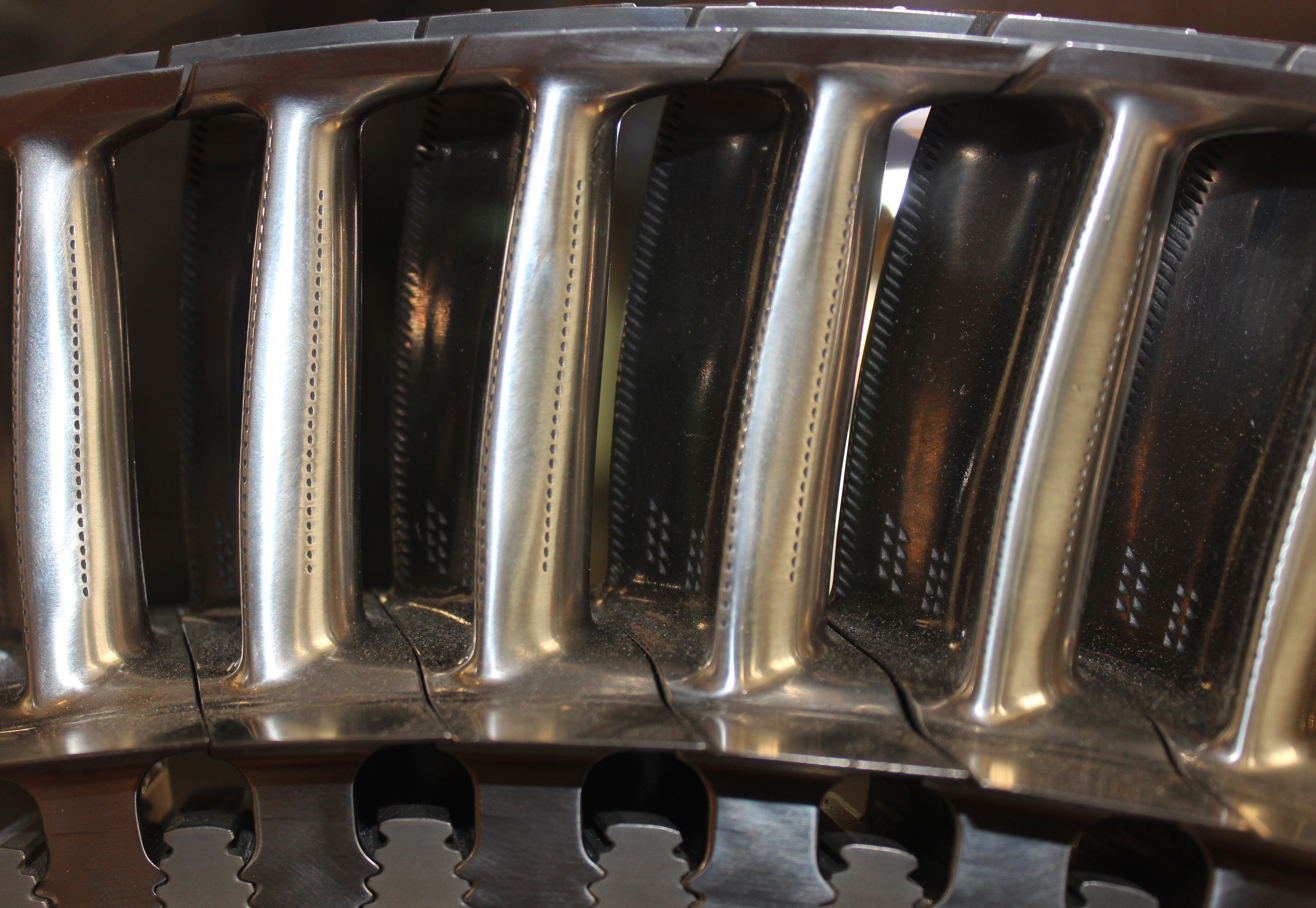
Nickel-alloy high pressure turbine blades with cooling holes for use in gas hotter than their melting point

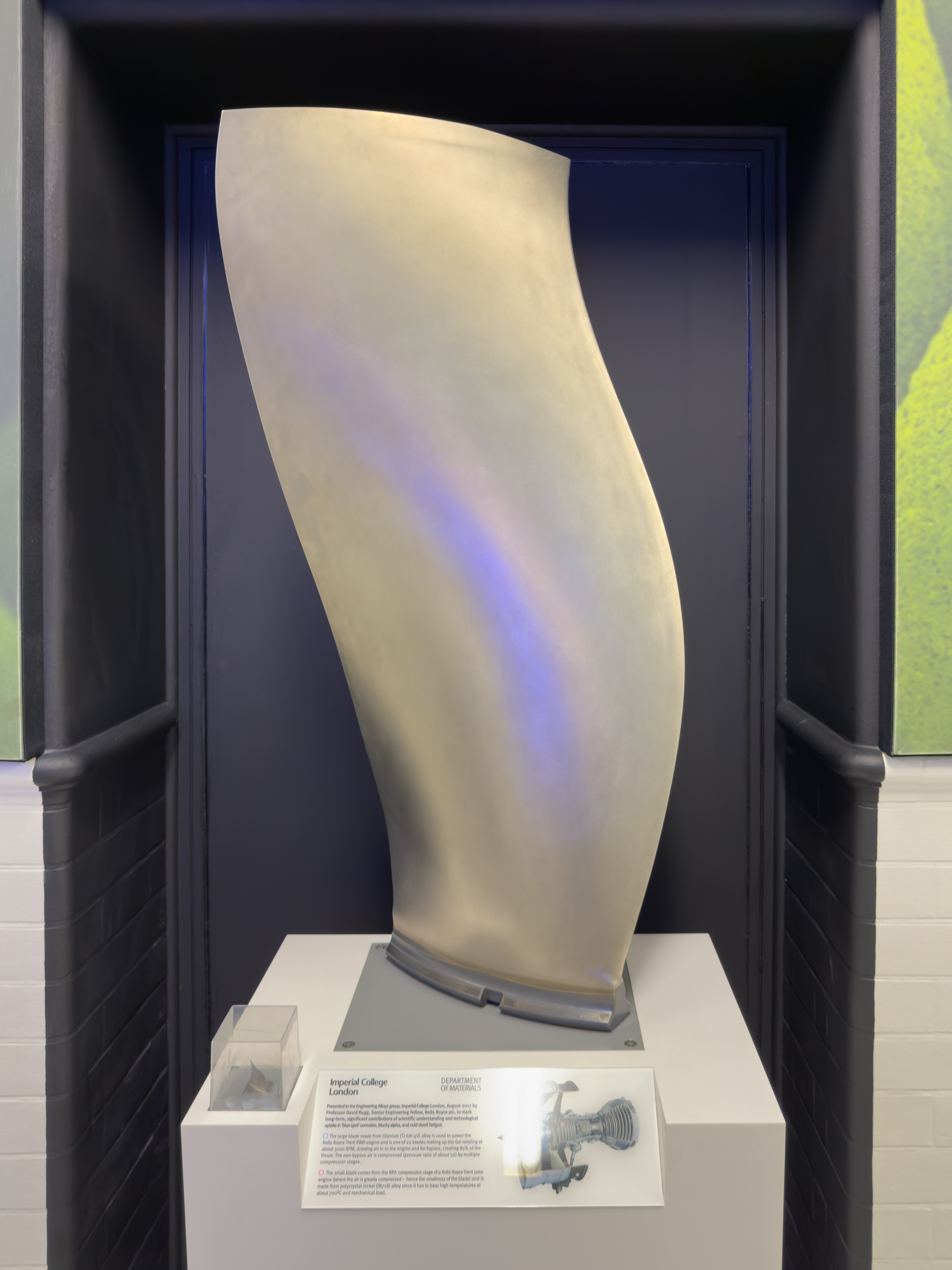
A hollow titanium fan blade of the Trent XWB.

Like its RB211 predecessor, the Trent uses a concentric three-spool design rather than a two-spool configuration. The Trent family keeps a similar layout, but each spool can be individually scaled and can rotate more closely to its optimal speed. The core noise levels and exhaust emissions are lower than those of the RB211.

Hollow titanium fan blades with an internal Warren-girder structure achieve strength, stiffness and damage tolerance at low weight. To allow the blades of the HP turbine to operate in temperatures above their melting point, cooling air is bled from the compressor through laser-drilled holes in the hollow turbine blades, each made from a single crystal of a nickel alloy and covered by thermal barrier coatings. Each turbine blade removes up to 560 kW (750 hp) from the gas stream.

In April 1998, the RB211-524HT was introduced for the 747-400 with the Trent 700 core, replacing the previous RB211-524G/H with 2% better TSFC, up to a 40% lower NOx emissions and a 50 °C cooler turbine. The Trent 800 LP spool rotates at 3300 rpm, its 110 in (279 cm) diameter fan tip travels at 482 m/s. The Trent 900's 116 in (290 cm) fan keeps a low mean jet velocity at take-off to lower the Airbus A380's noise.

== Variants ==
=== First Trent 600 ===
At the McDonnell Douglas MD-11 programme launch at the end of 1986, the airframe was only offered with GE CF6-80C2 or PW4000 engines, however Rolls-Royce was preparing to propose the 747-400's RB211-524D4D rated at 58,000 lbf (260 kN). By June 1988, Rolls-Royce was investing over $540 million to develop the uprated RB-211-524L with a new 95 in (240 cm) fan (up from 86 in (220 cm)) for the -524G/H and a fourth LP turbine stage up from three, targeting 65,000 to 70,000 lbf (290 to 310 kN). Rated at 65,000 lbf (290 kN), the Trent made its first run on 27 August 1990 in Derby. By July 1991, the MD-11 Trent was abandoned after the demise of Air Europe, its only customer. By February 1992, there were four Trent 600 engines with a 94.6 in (240 cm) fan. By September 1992, three had been rebuilt as Trent 700 engines for the A330 with a 97.4 in (247 cm) fan.

=== Trent 700 ===
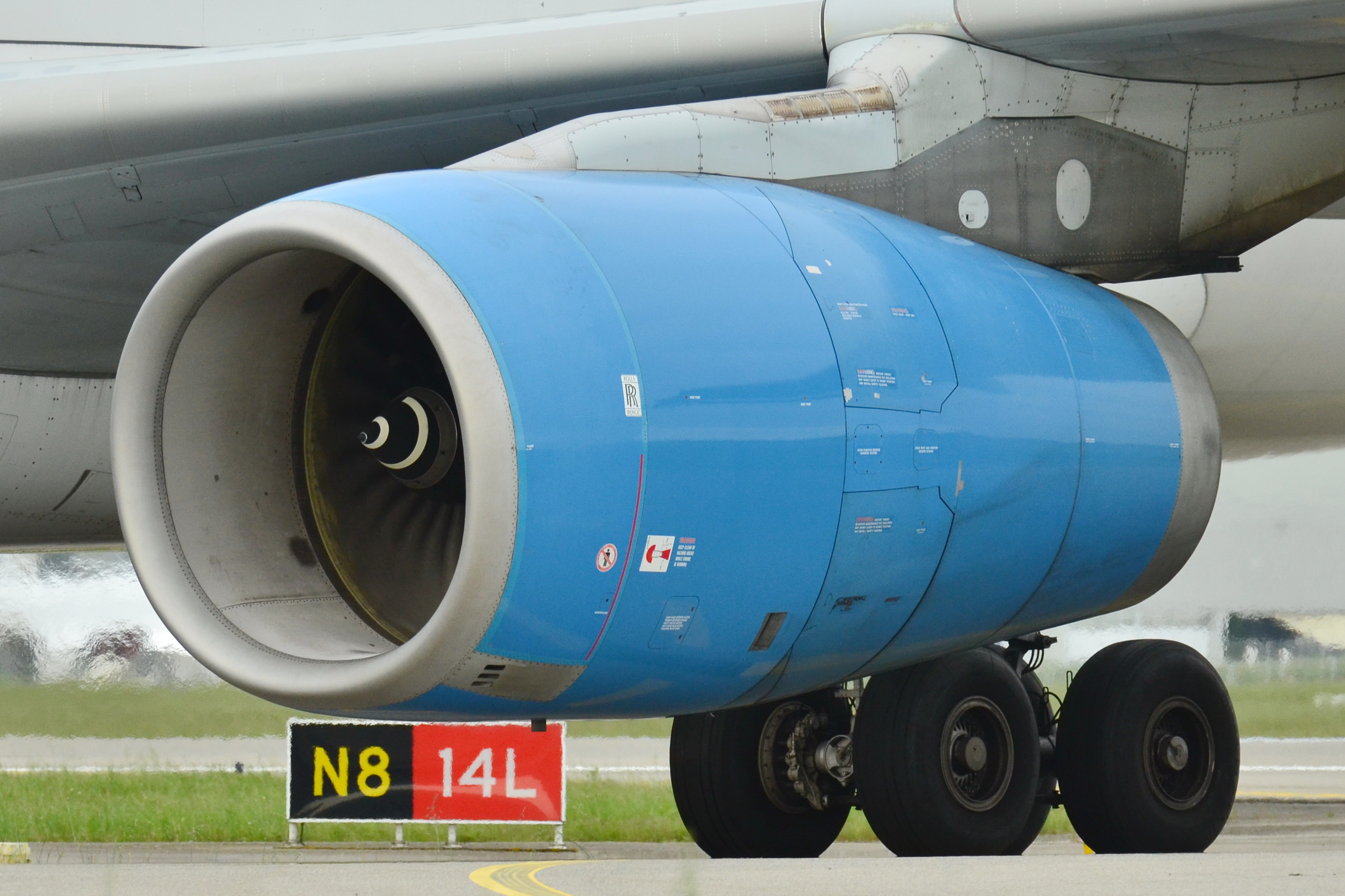
The Trent 700 nacelle on the A330 has an exhaust mixer

Rolls-Royce was studying a RB211 development for the Airbus A330 at its launch in June 1987. The Trent 700 was first selected by Cathay Pacific in April 1989, first ran in summer 1992, was certified in January 1994 and put into service in March 1995. Keeping the characteristic three-shaft architecture of the RB211, it is the first variant of the Trent family. With its 97.4 in (247 cm) fan for a 5:1 bypass ratio, it produces 300.3–316.3 kN (67,500–71,100 lbf) of thrust and reaches an overall pressure ratio of 36:1. It competes with the GE CF6-80E1 and the PW4000 to power the A330.

=== Trent 800 ===
The Trent 800 is one of the engine options for the early Boeing 777 variants. Launched in September 1991, it first ran in September 1993, was granted EASA certification on 27 January 1995, and entered service in 1996. It reached a 40% market share, ahead of the competing PW4000 and GE90, and the last Trent 800-powered 777 was delivered in 2010. The Trent 800 has the Trent family three shaft architecture, with a 280 cm (110 in) fan. With a 6.4:1 bypass ratio and an overall pressure ratio reaching 40.7:1, it generates up to 413.4 kN (92,900 lbf) of thrust.

=== Trent 8100 ===
In the early Trent 800 studies in 1990, Rolls-Royce forecast a growth potential from 85,000 to 95,000 lbf (380 to 420 kN) with a new HP core. By March 1997, Boeing studied 777-200X/300X growth derivatives for a September 2000 introduction: GE was proposing a 454 kN (102,000 lbf) GE90-102B, while P&W offered its 436 kN (98,000 lbf) PW4098 and Rolls-Royce was proposing a 437 kN (98,000 lbf) Trent 8100. Rolls-Royce was also investigating another variant, the Trent 8102, which would produce over 445 kN (100,000 lbf) of thrust. By December 1997, the -300X MTOW grew to 324,600 kg (715,600 lb). The 454 kN (102,000 lbf) Trent 8104 design was to be completed by June 1998, while the -200X entry into service slipped to mid-2002. Higher thrust was obtained with new swept fan blades while keeping a 2.79 m (110 in) fan.

The 104,000 lbf (460 kN) Trent 8104 first ran on 16 December 1998, and exceeded 110,000 lbf (490 kN) of thrust five days later, before two other engines would join by mid-1999. The swept fan blades produce 2–3% more flow at a given speed with the same 2.8 m (110 in) fan, for an additional 10,000 lbf (44 kN) of thrust, while fan efficiency is 1% better. The HP compressor rotors and stators and the IP compressor stators were designed with 3D aerodynamics. As the 777-200X/300X grew to a MTOW of 340,500 kg (750,700 lb), thrust requirements drifted to 110,000–114,000 lbf (490–510 kN). The fan diameter was to reach 2.9 m (110 in) to increase the thrust.

By June 1999, the 8104 served as a basis for the proposed 115,000 lbf (510 kN) Trent 8115, with a scaled core by 2.5% geometrically and 5% aerodynamically and a fan enlarged from 2.8 to 3.0 m (110 to 118 in), while keeping the Trent 800 architecture: an eight-stage IP compressor and a six-stage HP compressor both driven by a single-stage turbine, and a five-stage LP turbine. In July 1999, Boeing selected the General Electric GE90 over the Trent 8115 and P&W offer to exclusively power the longer-range 777s, as GE offered to substantially finance the airframe's development, for around $100 million. Rolls-Royce later dropped the Trent 8115 but continued to work on the Trent 8104 as a technology demonstrator.

=== Trent 500 ===
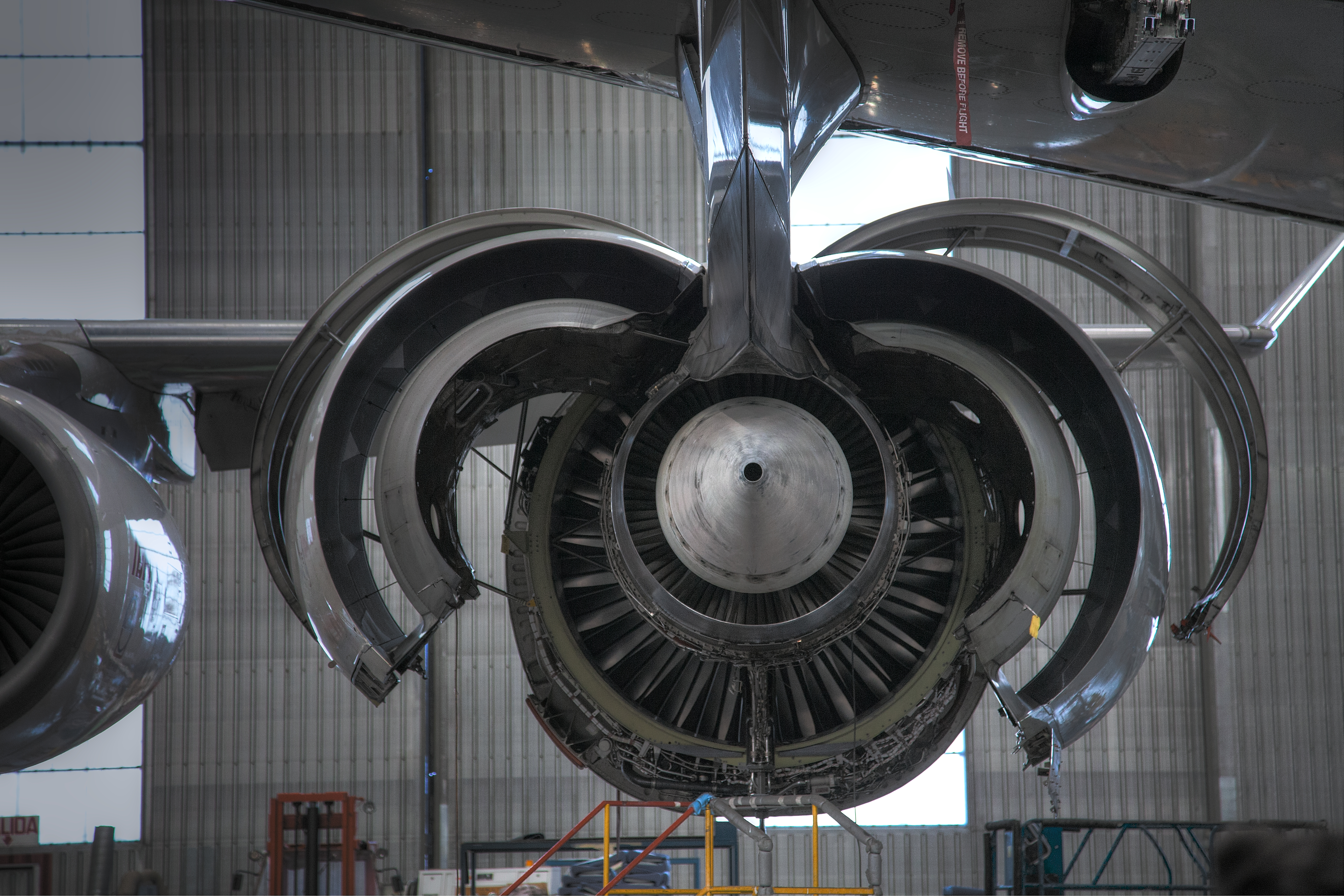
Trent 500 on wing, cowlings open

The Trent 500 exclusively powers the larger A340-500/600 variants. It was selected in June 1997, first ran in May 1999, first flew in June 2000, and achieved certification on 15 December 2000. It entered service in July 2002 and 524 engines were delivered on-wing until the A340 production ended in 2011. Keeping the three spool architecture of the Trent family, it has the Trent 700's 2.47 m (97 in) fan and a Trent 800 core scaled down. It produces up to 275 kN (62,000 lbf) of thrust at take-off and has a bypass ratio up to 8.5:1 in cruise.

=== Trent 900 ===
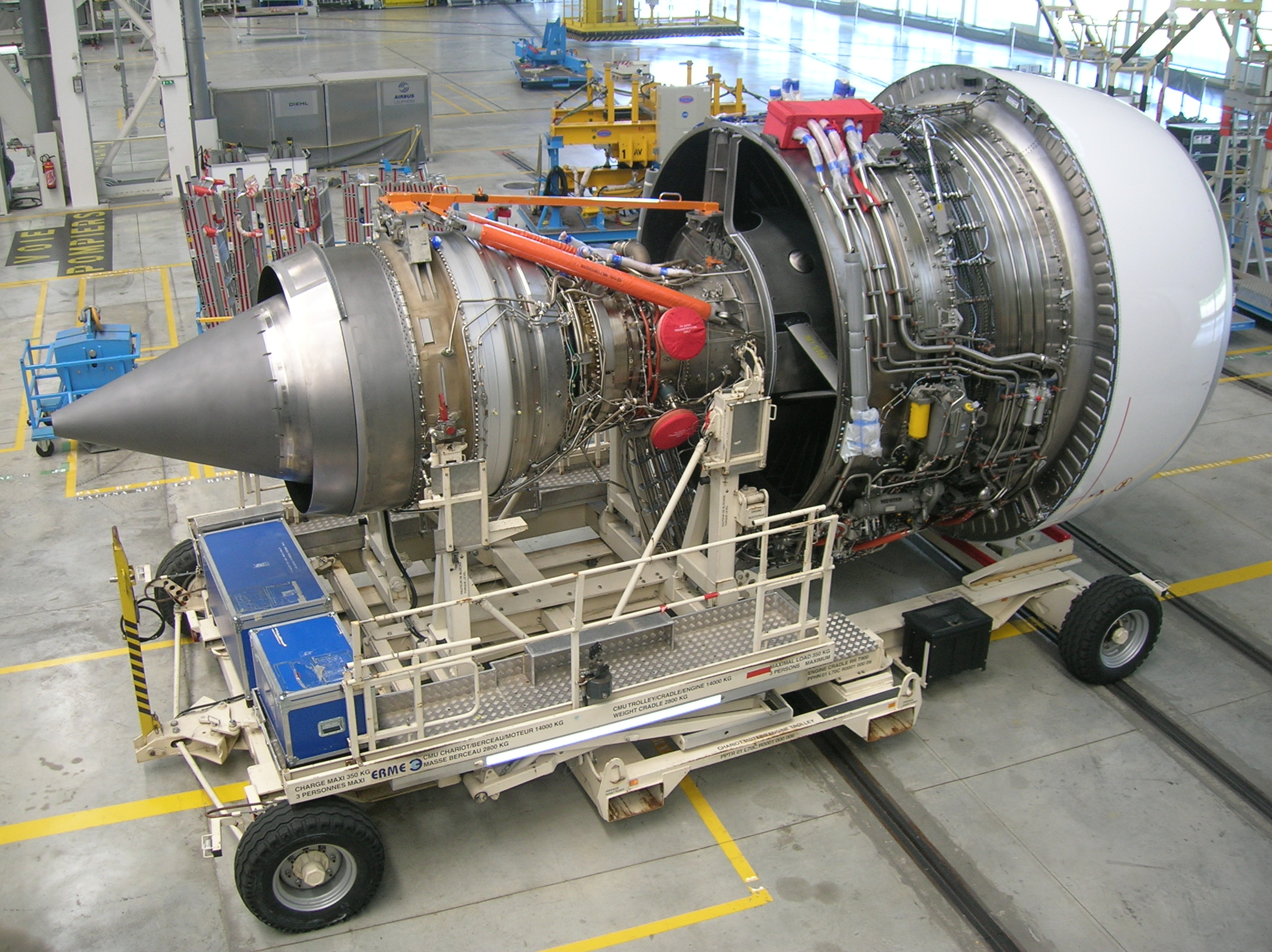
Trent 900 on the A380 assembly line

The Trent 900 powers the Airbus A380, competing with the Engine Alliance GP7000. Initially proposed for the Boeing 747-500/600X in July 1996, this first application was later abandoned but it was offered for the A3XX, launched as the A380 in December 2000. It first ran on 18 March 2003, made its maiden flight on 17 May 2004 on an A340 testbed, and was certified by the EASA on 29 October 2004. Producing up to 374 kN (84,000 lbf), the Trent 900 has the same three shaft architecture of the Trent family with a 2.95 m (116 in) fan. It has an 8.5–8.7:1 bypass ratio and a 37–39:1 overall pressure ratio.

=== Second Trent 600 ===
In March 2000, Boeing was to launch the longer range 767-400ERX powered by 65,000–68,000 lbf (290–300 kN) engines, with deliveries planned for 2004. In July, Rolls-Royce was to supply its Trent 600 for the 767-400ERX and Boeing 747X, while the European Union was limiting the Engine Alliance offer on quadjets. The 68,000–72,000 lbf (300–320 kN) Trent 600 was scaled from the Trent 500 with a swept fan diameter raised to 2.59 m (102 in) for a higher bypass ratio and lower fuel burn. Boeing offered the longer-range 767-400ERX with a higher MTOW and a higher thrust for better takeoff performance. The 767-400ERX was dropped in 2001 to favour the Sonic Cruiser. When Boeing launched the 747-8 in November 2005, it was exclusively powered by the General Electric GEnx.

=== Trent 1000 ===
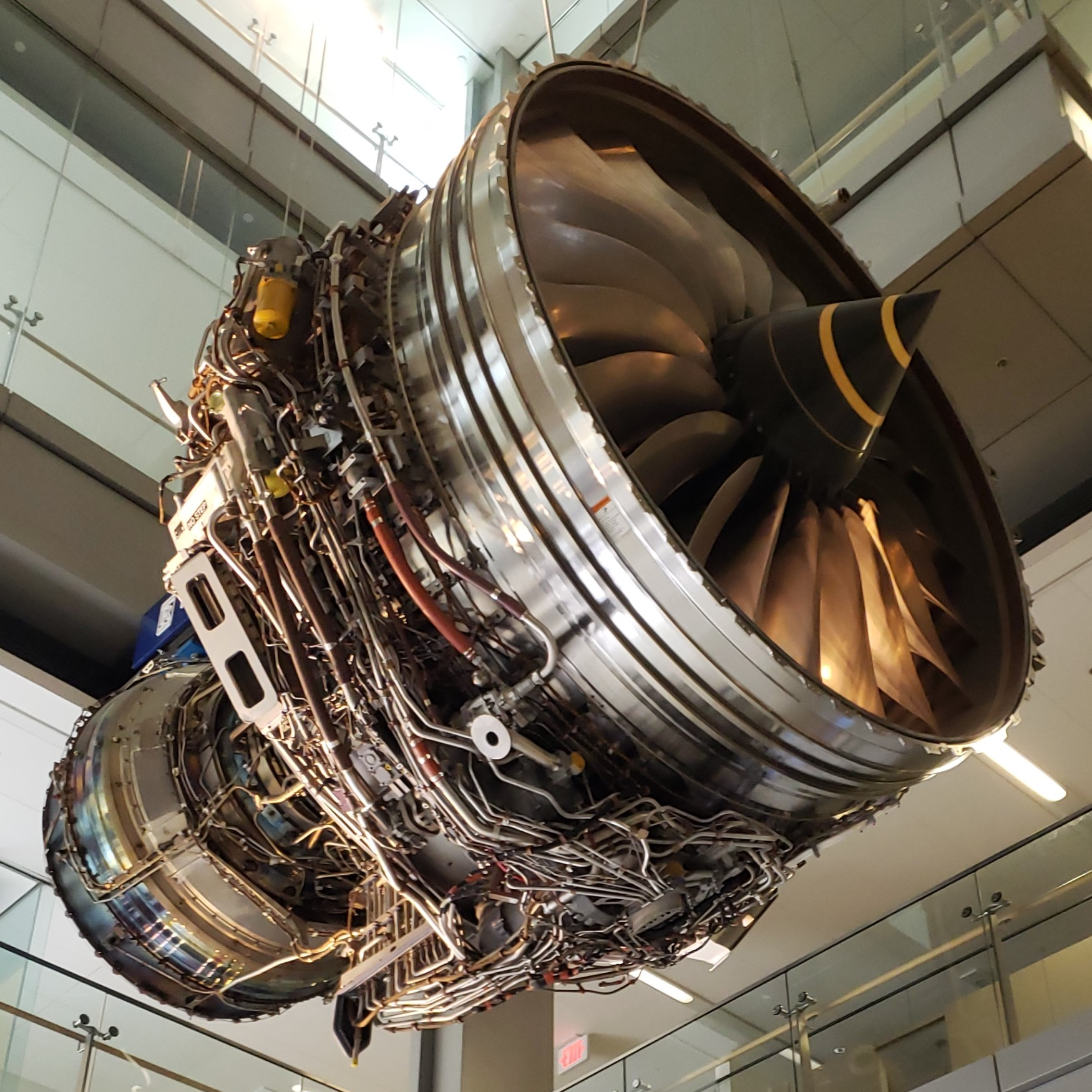
A Trent 1000 is being exhibited in Virginia Tech.

The Rolls-Royce Trent 1000 is one of the two engine options for the Boeing 787 Dreamliner, competing with the General Electric GEnx. It first ran on 14 February 2006 and first flew on 18 June 2007 before a joint EASA/FAA certification on 7 August 2007 and service introduction on 26 October 2011. The 53,000–78,000 lbf (240–350 kN) engine has a bypass ratio of over 10:1, a 2.8 m (110 in) fan, and the three-shaft layout characteristic of the Trent series.

The updated Trent 1000 TEN with technology from the Trent XWB and the Advance3 aims for up to 3% better fuel burn. It first ran in mid-2014, was EASA certified in July 2016, first flew on a 787 on 7 December 2016 and was introduced on 23 November 2017. Corrosion-related fatigue cracking of IP turbine blades was discovered in early 2016, grounding up to 44 aircraft and costing Rolls-Royce at least £1354 million. By early 2018 it had a 38% market share of the confirmed order book. The Trent 7000 is a version with bleed air used for the Airbus A330neo.

==== Trent 7000 ====
As a direct derivative of Trent 1000, the Rolls-Royce Trent 7000 exclusively powers the Airbus A330neo. Announced on 14 July 2014, it first ran on 27 November 2015, made its first flight on 19 October 2017 aboard on an A330neo, received its EASA type certification on 20 July 2018 as a Trent 1000 variant, was first delivered on 26 November, and was cleared for ETOPS 330 by 20 December. Compared to the A330's Trent 700, the 68,000–72,000 lbf (300–320 kN) engine doubles the bypass ratio to 10:1 and halves emitted noise. Pressure ratio is increased to 50:1 and it has a 112 in (280 cm) fan and a bleed air system. Fuel consumption is improved by 11%.

=== Trent 1500 ===
When the 380 t (840,000 lb) MTOW A340-600HGW first flew in November 2005, Airbus was studying an enhanced version of the larger A340 variants to enter service in 2011. It would better compete with the 777-300ER and its 8–9% lower fuel burn than the A340-600: improved General Electric GEnx or Trent 1500 engines would erode this by 6–7%. The Trent 1500 would keep the Trent 500's 2.47 m (97 in) fan diameter and nacelle, with the smaller, advanced Trent 1000 core and a revised LP turbine for a bypass ratio increased from 7.5–7.6:1 to 9.5:1. The last A340 was delivered in 2011 as it was replaced by the updated A350XWB design.

=== Trent XWB ===
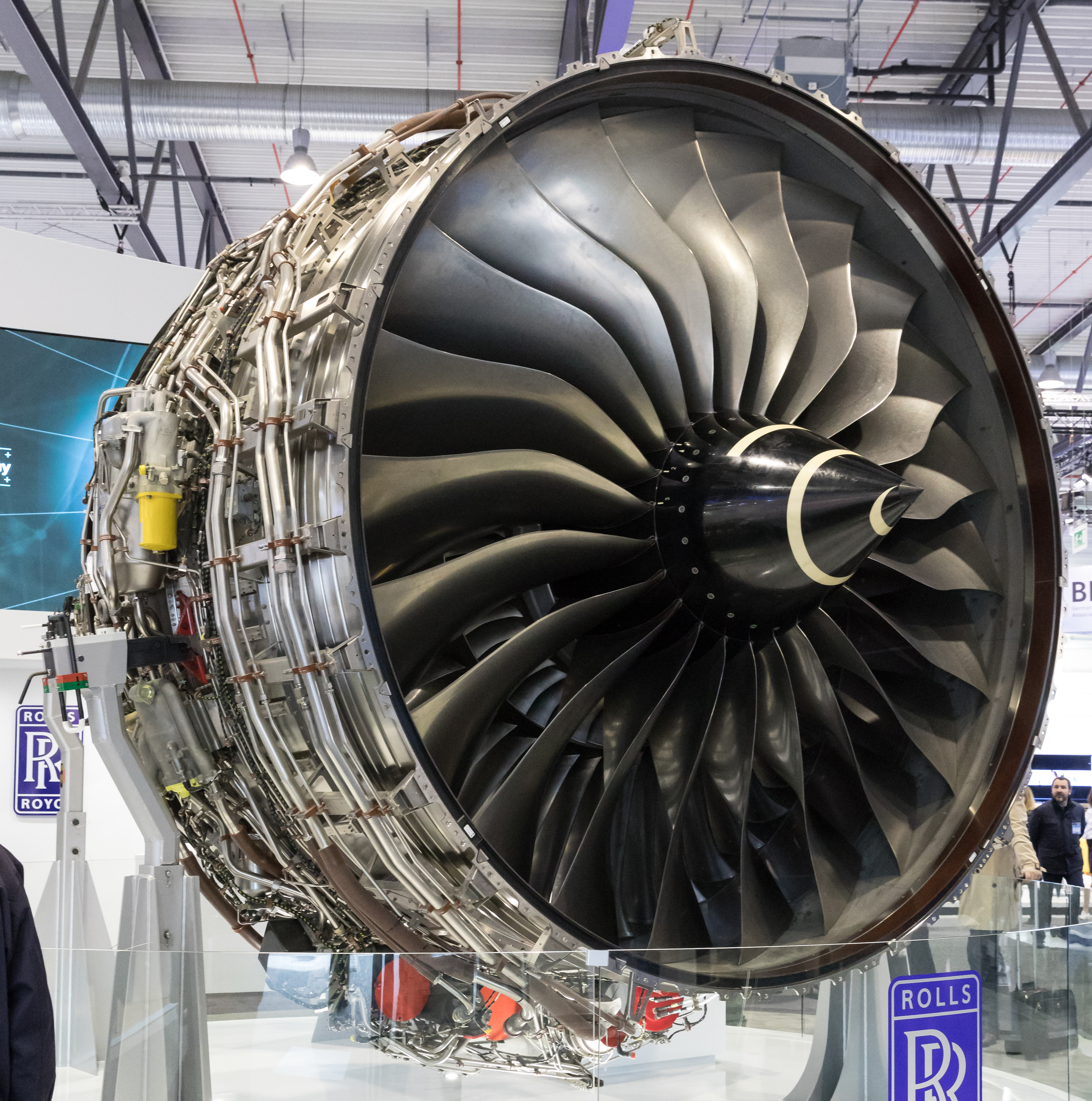
The 3 m (120 in) fan of the Trent XWB

The Trent XWB was selected in July 2006 to exclusively power the Airbus A350 XWB. The first engine was run on 14 June 2010, it first flew on an Airbus A380 testbed on 18 February 2012, was certified in early 2013, and first flew on an A350 on 14 June 2013. It keeps the characteristic three-shaft layout of the Trent, with a 3 m (120 in) fan, an IP and HP spool. The XWB-84 generates up to 84,200 lbf (375 kN) of thrust and the XWB-97 up to 97,000 lbf (431 kN). The engine has a 9.6:1 bypass ratio and a 50:1 pressure ratio. It had its first in-flight shutdown on 11 September 2018, as the fleet accumulated 2.2 million flight hours. It is the most powerful among all Trent engines.

=== Non-aircraft variants ===
==== MT30 (Marine Turbine) ====
The MT30 (Marine Turbine) is a derivative of the Trent 800 (with a Trent 500 gearbox fitted), producing 36 MW for maritime applications. The current version is a turboshaft engine, producing 36 MW, using the Trent 800 core to drive a power turbine which takes power to an electrical generator or to mechanical drives such as waterjets or propellers. Amongst others, it powers the Royal Navy's Queen Elizabeth-class aircraft carriers.

==== Industrial Trent 60 Gas Turbine ====
This derivative is designed for power generation and mechanical drive, much like the Marine Trent. It delivers up to 66 MW of electricity at 42% efficiency. It comes in two key versions DLE (Dry Low Emission) and WLE (Wet Low Emission). The WLE is water injected, allowing it to produce 58 MW at ISO conditions instead of 52 MW. It shares components with the Trent 700 and 800. The heat from the exhaust, some 416–433 °C, can be used to heat water and drive steam turbines, improving efficiency of the package. Besides Rolls-Royce, the Trent 60 is also packaged by UK-based Centrax LTD, a privately owned engineering firm based in Newton Abbot, UK.

== Operational history ==
First run in August 1990 as the model Trent 700, the Trent has achieved significant commercial success, having been selected as the launch engine for all three of the 787 variants (Trent 1000), the A380 (Trent 900) and the A350 (Trent XWB). Its overall share of the markets in which it competes is around 40%. Sales of the Trent family of engines have made Rolls-Royce the second biggest supplier of large civil turbofans after General Electric, relegating rival Pratt & Whitney to third position. By June 2019, the Trent family had completed over 125 million hours.

British Airways and Thai Airways are currently the largest operator of Trents, with four variants in service or on order, followed by Singapore Airlines and Cathay Pacific with three variants in service. (Note: As of March 2024 Singapore Airlines has 12 Trent 900 powered Airbus A380-800s, 63 Airbus A350-900s (including 7 A350-900ULRs) powered by Trent XWB, as well as 22 Boeing 787-10s powered by Trent 1000 engines. Singapore Airlines' LCC subsidiary Scoot also operates all of their current Boeing 787s (11 Boeing 787-8s and 10 Boeing 787-9s) with Trent 1000s.)

=== Incidents ===
On 17 January 2008, a British Airways Boeing 777-236ER, operating as Flight 38 from Beijing to London, crash-landed at Heathrow Airport after both Trent 800 engines lost power during the aircraft's final approach. The subsequent investigation found that ice released from the fuel system had accumulated on the fuel-oil heat exchanger, leading to a restriction of fuel flow to the engines. This resulted in Airworthiness Directives mandating the replacement of the heat exchanger. This order was extended to the 500 and 700 series engines after a similar loss of power was observed on one engine of an Airbus A330 in one incident, and both engines in another. The modification involves replacing a face plate with many small protruding tubes with one that is flat.

On 4 November 2010, a Qantas Airbus A380-842 (Registration VH-OQA), operating as Flight 32 en route from Singapore to Sydney, suffered an uncontained engine failure (explosion) in one of its four Trent 972-84. The cause was traced to an incorrectly manufactured oil feed stub pipe cracking and causing a turbine disc to overspeed and fracture. In the aftermath of the incident, Qantas, Lufthansa and Singapore Airlines replaced their affected engines. Rolls Royce would pay a $104m settlement to Qantas, and introduce safeguards including a software fix to shut down the engine during an overspeed event.

== Research ==
=== Affordable Near-Term Low Emissions ===
Between 1 March 2000 and 28 February 2005, the EU funded the EEFAE project, aiming to design and test two strategies to reduce CO_{2} by 12–20% and nitrous oxides by up to 80% from 2007/2008, with an overall budget of €101.6 Million including €50.9 from the EU and coordinated by Rolls-Royce plc. It was equally shared between the ANTLE demonstrator and the CLEAN programme for longer term technology applications. The ANTLE programme targeted reductions of 12% in CO_{2} emissions, 60% in NO_{x} emissions, 20% in acquisition cost, 30% in life cycle cost and 50% in development cycle, while improving reliability by 60%. The test phase ended by summer 2005.

The ANTLE engine was based on a Rolls-Royce Trent 500. Rolls-Royce Deutschland was responsible for the high pressure compressor, Rolls-Royce UK for the combustion chamber and the high pressure turbine, Italian Avio for the intermediate pressure turbine, and ITP for the Low Pressure Turbine (LPT) and the external casing for an investment of €20.5 million, a 20% stake in the programme. Volvo Aero was responsible for the rear turbine structures. It has a new 5 stage HP compressor, a lean burn combustor and unshrouded HP turbine and a variable-geometry IP turbine. Hispano Suiza's new accessory gearbox, Goodrich's new distributed control system, and Techspace Aero's new oil system were also fitted.

=== Advanced Low-Pressure System (ALPS) ===
After flight tests in 2014 of CTi fan blades with a titanium leading edge and carbon casing, they had indoor and outdoor tests in 2017, including crosswind, noise and tip clearance studies, flutter mapping, performance and icing conditions trials. In late 2018 Rolls-Royce has ground tested its ALPS demonstrator: a Trent 1000 fitted with composite fan blades and case, including bird strike trials.

=== Advance ===
On 26 February 2014, Rolls-Royce detailed its Trent future developments. The Advance is the first design, which could be ready from the end of the 2020s and aims to offer at least 20% better fuel burn than the first generation of Trents. The Advance bypass ratio should exceed 11:1 and its overall pressure ratio 60:1.

In previous Trents, the HP spool was similar in all models and the engine grew by increasing the intermediate pressure spool's work. The Advance reverses this trend and the load is shifted towards the high pressure spool, with a greater pressure ratio, up to 10 compressor stages compared to 6 on the Trent XWB and a two-stage turbine replacing the current single-stage. The IP compressor will shrink from the 8 stages of today's XWB to 4 and the IP turbine will be single- rather than of two stages.

The Advance3 ground-based demonstrator includes lean burn, run before on a Trent architecture only; ceramic matrix composite (CMC) for turbine high-temperature capability in the first stage seal segments and cast-bond first stage vanes; hybrid ball bearings with ceramic rollers running on metallic races, required to manage high load environments inside smaller cores.

Opened in 2016, R-R's $30 million CMC facility in California produced its first parts, seals, for the start of their deployment before being used in the static components of the second-stage HP turbine. The twin fuel-distribution system in the lean-burn combustor adds complexity with a sophisticated control and switching system and doubles the pipework but should improve fuel consumption and reduce NO_{x} emissions. Hybrid ceramic bearings are newly configured to deal with loading changes and will cope with higher temperatures.

More variable vanes in one IP and four HP compressor stages will be optimised for constant changes through the flight envelope. An air pipe is produced by additive manufacturing and prototype components come from new suppliers. The Advance3 will survey bearing load, water ingestion, noise sources and their mitigation, heat and combustor rumble while blade-tip, internal clearances and adaptive control operation are radiographed in-motion to verify the thermo-mechanical modelling. The Boeing New Midsize Airplane needs falls in its thrust range. Advanced cooled metallic components and ceramic matrix composite parts will be tested in a late 2018 demonstrator based on a Trent XWB-97 within the high temperature turbine technology (HT3) initiative.

The core will be combined with a Trent XWB-84 fan and a Trent 1000 LP turbine for mid-2017 ground testing. The Advance3 demonstrator was sent from the Bristol production facility to the Derby test stand in July 2017 to be evaluated until early 2018. The demonstrator began initial runs at Derby in November 2017.

In early 2018, the demonstrator attained 90% core power, reaching a 450 psi (31 bar) P30 pressure at the rear of the HP compressor, while measuring bearing loads, changed by the different compressor arrangement. The lean burn combustor did not generate any rumble as further tests will cover water ingestion, noise, X-rays of the engine operating, and core-zone and hot-end thermal surveys. By July 2018, the Advance3 core ran at full power. By early 2019, the engine had run over 100 hours.

=== Advanced low-emission combustion system (ALECSys) ===
A standalone engine will test the ALECSys on ground before another will be flight tested. Indoor ground tests of the lean-burn combustor were concluded on a modified Trent 1000 in January 2018, before being sent to Manitoba for cold-weather trials in February 2018, covering start-ups and ice ingestion. Noise testing will follow on an outside rig, then flight tests in the next couple of years after 2018.

=== UltraFan ===
The UltraFan is a geared turbofan with a variable pitch fan system that promises at least 25% efficiency improvement. The UltraFan aims for a 15:1 bypass ratio and 70:1 overall pressure ratio.

The Ultrafan keeps the Advance core, but also contains a geared turbofan architecture with variable-pitch fan blades. The fan varies pitch to optimise for each flight phase, eliminating the need for a thrust reverser. Rolls-Royce planned to use carbon composite fan blades instead of its usual hollow titanium blades. The combination was expected to reduce weight by 340 kg (750 lb) per engine.

The variable pitch fan facilitates low pressure ratio fan operability. Rolls-Royce worked with Industria de Turbo Propulsores to test ion plating (IP) turbine blade technologies. In Dahlewitz near Berlin, Rolls-Royce built a power rig simulating loading conditions in flight, sized for 15–80 MW (20,000–107,000 hp) gear systems; and recruited 200 engineers. The ratio of the initial test gear will approach 4:1 and thrust could be up to 440 kN (100,000 lbf). The test rig is an €84 million ($94 million) investment.

In partnership with Liebherr, the 75 MW (100,000 hp) UltraFan gearbox was first run in October 2016. After the initial set of low-speed fan rig tests and the casting of second-generation titanium aluminide IP turbine blades, the initial UltraFan demonstrator concept design was to be frozen in 2017. Tests simulated aircraft pitch and roll on an attitude rig in September 2016 to assess oil flow in the gearbox. The gearbox went through high-power tests in May 2017. The UltraFan was to be 300 cm (120 in) in diameter. Fan blades with titanium leading edges were evaluated under the ALPS programme.

At the September 2017 International Society for Air Breathing Engines (ISABE) conference in Manchester, UK, Rolls-Royce's Chief Technology Officer Paul Stein announced it reached 52 MW (70,000 hp). In early 2018, a third gearbox was tested for endurance and reliability. The first gearbox was then disassembled for evaluation, confirming the component's performance predictions. In April 2018, Airbus agreed to provide aircraft integration and its nacelle and for flight testing, co-funded by the European Union research programme Clean Sky 2.

At the April 2018 ILA Berlin Air Show, flight testing was confirmed on Rolls-Royce's Boeing 747-200. The demonstrator generated 310–360 kN (70,000–80,000 lbf) of thrust, exploiting current testing on the Advance 3 and the 52 MW (70,000 hp) gearbox. Fan diameter could be up to 356 cm (140 in), compared to the Trent XWB's 300 cm (118 in) and the GE9X's 340 cm (134 in).

Higher bypass and lower fan pressure ratio induce low-speed fan instability that is remedied by variable-pitch blades instead of a variable area jet nozzle. Along with eliminating the thrust reverser, a short, slim nacelle is lighter and less draggy, but in reverse-thrust the flow is distorted, turning the nozzle into the bypass duct, and then partly reversed again into the intermediate compressor. The large fan could lead to gull-wing airframes. By July 2018, the UltraFan configuration was frozen. Detailed design and component manufacture was set to enable 2021 ground tests. The 800 mm (2 ft 7 in) diameter planetary gearbox has five planet gears, is sized to power 110–490 kN (25,000–110,000 lbf) turbofans and amassed over 250 hours of run time by early 2019.

In February 2019, introduction was delayed until 2027, to re-engine current aircraft, after full-scale ground tests in 2021. A variable-pitch fan or a more electric architecture would be needed beyond the 25% improvement over the Trent 800, for the 2030s-2040s. A 100–500 kW (130–670 hp) integrated starter-generator on the shaft cold end would allow a smaller accessory drive. It could drive an aft-fuselage boundary layer suction fan for a 35% better efficiency gain.

By February 2020, Rolls-Royce was manufacturing the 355 cm (140 in) diameter carbon fibre fan blades in Bristol, UK, saving with the composite fan case up to 700 kg (1,500 lb) on a twinjet. By March 2022, Rolls-Royce had transferred the power gearbox, tested to 64 MW (86,000 hp), from Dahlewitz to its UK site for assembly,

By May 2023, the first run was made with an 80,000 lbf (360 kN) demonstrator having a 14:1 bypass ratio, carbon-titanium fan blades, an Advance3 core and a new combustor. With 10% better fuel efficiency than the Trent XWB, the architecture could cover a 111–444 kN (25,000–100,000 lb_{f}) thrust range for single- or twin-aisles in the 2030s. In November 2023, it was announced that the demonstrator had achieved at least 85,000 lbf (380 kN) in maximum power tests, exceeding the design brief of 80,000lbf and had accumulated over 70 hours of run-time. At the 2024 Farnborough Air Show, Rolls-Royce announced upgrades to its Trent engines, with some enhancements drawing on the UltraFan technology demonstrator project.

By 2025, Rolls-Royce planned to run two versions by 2028, the scaled-down UltraFan 30 for single-aisles and the UltraFan 80 for widebodies, with two engines for each and flight tests to follow before 2030. The UltraFan 30 would have a thrust above 30,000 lbf (130 kN), a fan diameter towards 90 in (230 cm) compared to the current 81 in (206 cm) PW1100G and a bypass ratio towards 15:1, up from 10-12:1 on current geared engines. Rolls-Royce launched its HEAVEN R&D programme in January 2023, partly funded by the EU’s Clean Aviation scheme which will allocate up to €70 million by 2029. For Rolls-Royce, efficiency benefits from an open rotor like the CFM RISE are eroded by installation requirements like noise and blade-out protections. Rolls-Royce is seeking UK government financial support toward UltraFan 30 development, while exploring funding agreements with other governments that could see engines manufactured overseas.

== Applications ==
- Airbus A330 (Trent 700)
- Airbus A330neo (Trent 7000)
- Airbus A340 (-500 and -600 series only) (Trent 500)
- Airbus A350 (Trent XWB)
- Airbus A380 (Trent 900)
- Boeing 777 (-200, -200ER and -300 series only) (Trent 800)
- Boeing 787 Dreamliner (Trent 1000)

== Specifications ==
Gas Turbine Engines
Variant	Thrust	Mass	Bypass	Pressure	Config	Fan	Cruise TSFC	First run	Application
Trent 600 (1)	290 kN; 65,000 lbf				8 IPC, 6 HPC; 1 HPT, 1 IPT, 4 LPT	94.6 in (240 cm)	0.59 lb/lbf/h 17 g/kN/s	1990	MD-11
Trent 700	300–316 kN; 67,500–71,100 lbf	6,160 kg 13,580 lb	5.0:1	36:1	8 IPC, 6 HPC; 1 HPT, 1 IPT, 4 LPT	97.4 in (247 cm); 26 blades	0.562 lb/lbf/h 15.9 g/kN/s	1992	Airbus A330
Trent 800	334–415 kN; 75,000–93,400 lbf	6,078 kg 13,400 lb	6.4:1	33.9–40.7:1	8 IPC, 6 HPC; 1 HPT, 1 IPT, 5 LPT	110 in (279 cm); 26 blades	0.560 lb/lbf/h 15.9 g/kN/s	1993	Boeing 777-200/200ER/300
Trent 500	240–250 kN; 53,000–56,000 lbf	4,990 kg 11,000 lb	7.6:1	36.3:1	8 IPC, 6 HPC; 1 HPT, 1 IPT, 5 LPT	97.4 in (247 cm); 26 blades	0.542 lb/lbf/h 15.4 g/kN/s	1999	Airbus A340-500/600
Trent 600 (2)	280 kN; 63,000 lbf	4,840 kg 10,660 lb		41:1	8 IPC, 6 HPC; 1 HPT, 1 IPT, 5 LPT	102 in (259 cm); 26 blades	0.542 lb/lbf/h 15.4 g/kN/s	dropped	Boeing 747X; 767-400ERX
Trent 900	334–374 kN; 75,100–84,100 lbf	6,246 kg 13,770 lb	8.7–8.5:1	37–39:1	8 IPC, 6 HPC; 1 HPT, 1 IPT, 5 LPT	116 in (295 cm); 24 blades	0.522 lb/lbf/h 14.8 g/kN/s	2003	Airbus A380
Trent 1000	285–331 kN; 64,100–74,400 lbf	5,936–6,120 kg 13,087–13,492 lb	10:1	50:1	8 IPC, 6 HPC; 1 HPT, 1 IPT, 6 LPT	112 in (284 cm); 20 blades	0.506 lb/lbf/h 14.3 g/kN/s (Note: 10% better than Trent 700)	2006	Boeing 787
Trent 7000	300–320 kN; 68,000–72,000 lbf	6,445 kg 14,209 lb	10:1	50:1	8 IPC, 6 HPC; 1 HPT, 1 IPT, 6 LPT	112 in (284 cm); 20 blades	0.506 lb/lbf/h 14.3 g/kN/s	2015	Airbus A330neo
Trent XWB	370–430 kN; 84,000–97,000 lbf	7,277 kg 16,043 lb	9.6:1	50:1	8 IPC, 6 HPC; 1 HPT, 2 IPT, 6 LPT	118 in (300 cm); 22 blades	0.478 lb/lbf/h 13.5 g/kN/s (Note: 15 per cent fuel consumption advantage over the original Trent engine)	2010	Airbus A350 XWB

== See also ==
Related development

- Rolls-Royce RB211

Related lists

- List of aircraft engines
