= Rolls-Royce Trent 500 =

1990s British turbofan aircraft engine

Trent 500
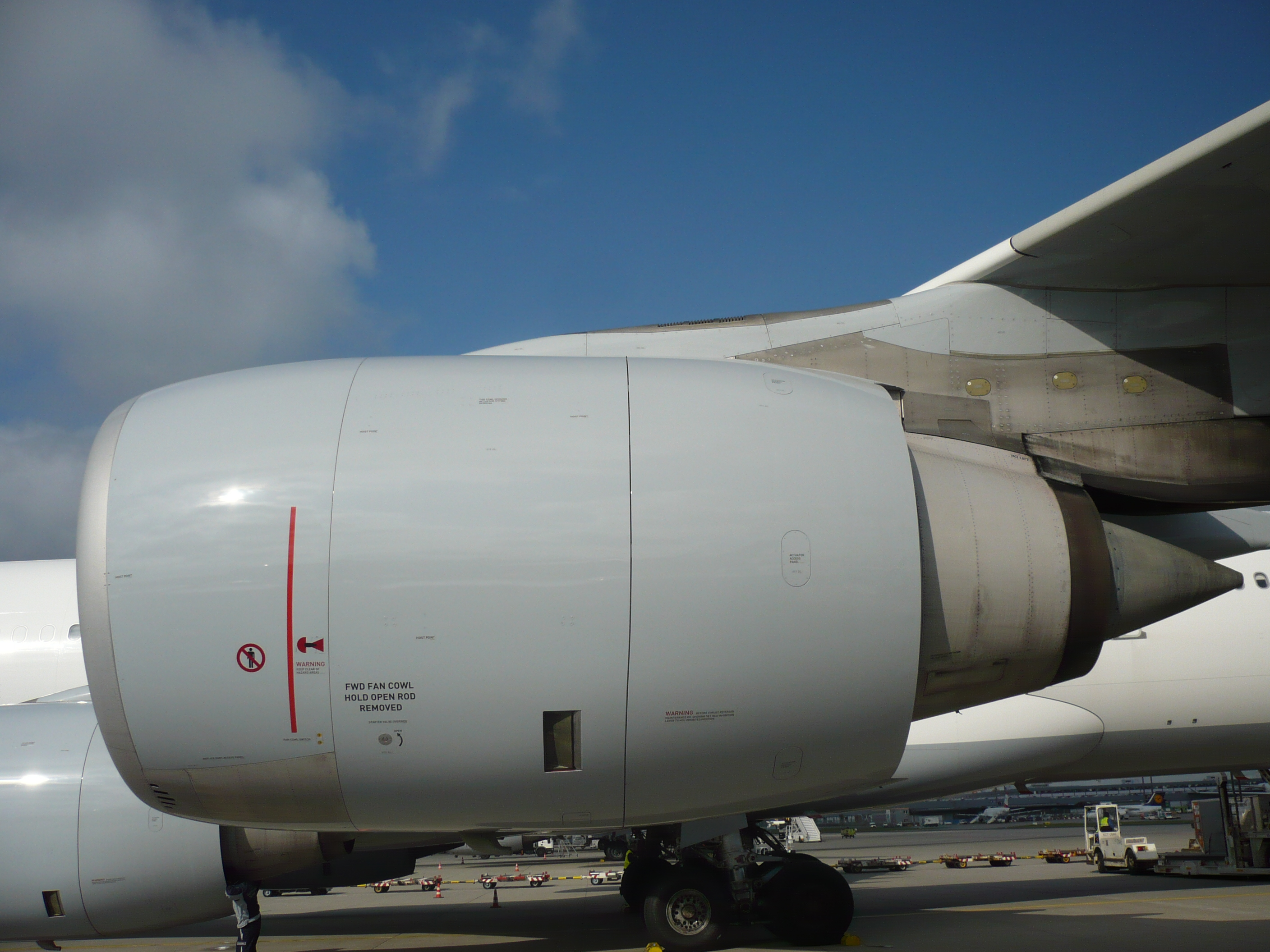
- A Trent 500 turbofan mounted on an Airbus A340-600 of Lufthansa.
- Type: Turbofan
- National origin: United Kingdom
- Manufacturer: Rolls-Royce
- First run: May 1999
- Major applications: Airbus A340-500/600
- Manufactured: 2001–2012
- Developed from: Trent 700 fan, Trent 800 core
- Developed into: Trent 900

The Rolls-Royce Trent 500 is a high-bypass turbofan produced by Rolls-Royce to power the larger A340-500/600 variants. It was selected in June 1997, first ran in May 1999, first flew in June 2000, and achieved certification on 15 December 2000. It entered service in July 2002 and 524 engines were delivered on-wing until the A340 production ended in 2012.

Keeping the three spool architecture of the Trent family, it has the Trent 700's 2.47 m (97.5 in) fan and a Trent 800 core scaled down. It produces up to 275 kN (62,000 lbf) of thrust at take-off and has a bypass ratio up to 8.5:1 in cruise.

== Development ==
Fan set used in the development of the Trent 500, now on display at Imperial College London.

In 1995, Airbus began considering an engine for two new long-range derivatives of its four-engined A340, the A340-500/600. The existing A340-200/300 was powered by CFM International CFM56 engines. However, the CFM56 was at the limit of its development capability, and would be unable to power the new A340-500/-600. In April 1996, Airbus signed an agreement with GE Aviation to develop a suitable engine, but decided not to proceed when GE demanded an exclusivity deal on the A340.

Certification was applied for on 9 February 1998, and first ran in May 1999. By July 1999, Rolls-Royce had secured $5 billion worth of Trent 500 orders. Flight testing began in late June 2000 on a modified A340 testbed. By July 2000, the test program had amassed 1,750h and 2,00 cycles, and aimed for 15,000h and 4,000-5,000 cycles before introduction. It achieved certification on 15 December 2000.

The Trent 500 entered service on the A340-600 with Virgin Atlantic in July 2002 and on the ultra-long range A340-500 with Emirates in December 2003. Air Canada had been expected to be the launch customer for the A340-500 in May 2003, but just before this on 1 April 2003 the airline filed for bankruptcy protection which resulted in delivery of its two A340-500s being delayed. This allowed Emirates to be the first airline to operate the type. After production of the Airbus A340 ended in 2011, a total of 131 A340-500/-600 have been delivered with 524 Trent 500 engines altogether; Lufthansa is the largest operator, with 24 delivered A340-600.

== Design ==
The Trent 500 is a high bypass turbofan with three spools: the fan is powered by a 5 stage Low Pressure turbine (nominal speed: 3,900 RPM), the Intermediate pressure spool has an 8-stage axial compressor (9,100 RPM) and the High Pressure spool has an 6-stage axial compressor (13,300 RPM), both driven by a single turbine stage. It has an annular combustor and is equipped with an Electronic Engine Control System.

It is flat rated at ISA + 15°C for 248.1–275.3 kN (55,800–61,900 lbf) net thrust at take-off and has an 8.5:1 bypass ratio in cruise.

The Trent 500 is essentially a scaled Trent 800, with a 2.47 m (97 in) fan with 26 unswept blades like the Trent 700. The IP and HP compressors and scaled-down by 20% from the Trent 892, while the turbines are scaled-down by 90% and are made of single crystal CMSX-4 alloy with thermal barrier coatings. Fuel burn is 1% lower because of 3D aerodynamics. It was tested up to 68,000 lbf (300 kN) to establish limits.

The Trent 500 powers the A340-500/600. It was certificated at 60,000 lbf (270 kN) thrust, but derated to 53,000 lbf (240 kN) as the Trent 553 to power the A340-500, and to 56,000 lbf (250 kN) as the Trent 556 for the A340-600 and A340-500HGW. However, a 60,000 lbf (270 kN) version is installed in the A340-600HGW (High Gross Weight), a higher-performance version of the A340-600. The Trent 500 has the same wide chord fan as the Trent 700, together with a core scaled from the Trent 800.

== Applications ==
- Airbus A340

== Specifications ==
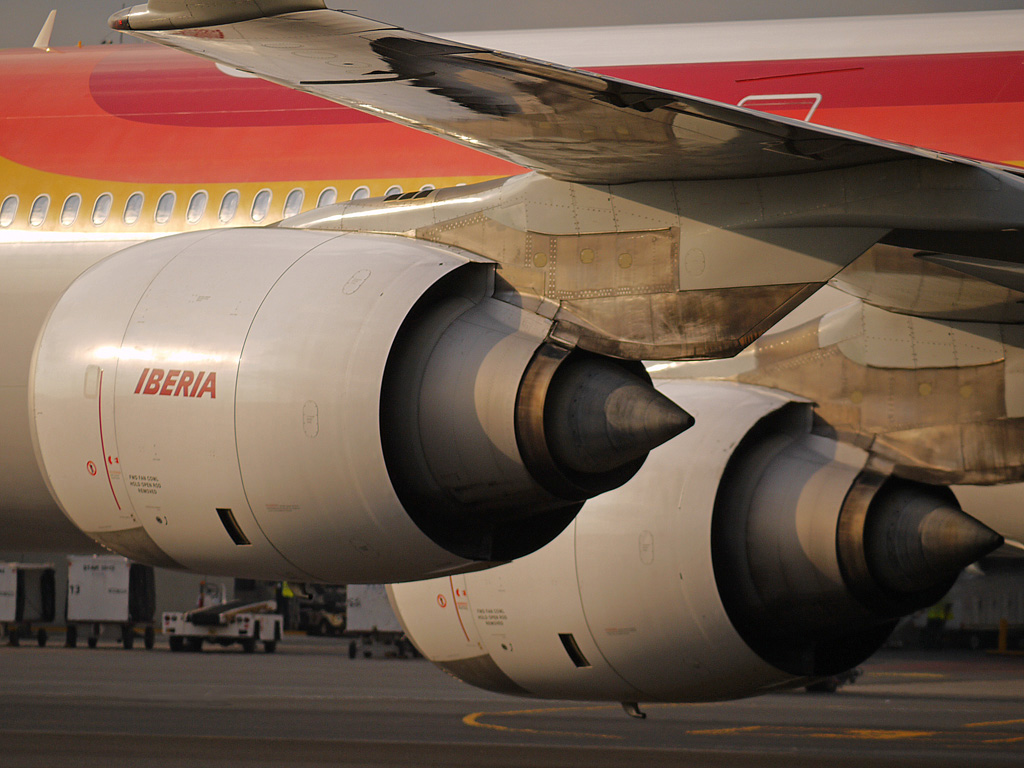
Trent 500 engines on the left wing of an Iberia A340-600

Data from EASA

==== General characteristics ====
- Type: Three-shaft high bypass turbofan
- Length: 468.9 cm (184.6 in)
- Diameter: 247 cm (97 in)
- Dry weight: 4,990 kg (11,000 lb)

==== Components ====
- Compressor: Single-stage fan, eight-stage intermediate pressure compressor, six-stage high pressure compressor
- Combustors: Tiled annular with 20 fuel injectors
- Turbine: Single-stage high pressure turbine, single-stage intermediate pressure turbine, five-stage low pressure turbine

==== Performance ====
- Maximum thrust: 248.1–275.3 kN (55,780–61,902 lbf)
- Overall pressure ratio: 35:1
- Bypass ratio: 7.5–7.6 to 8.5:1 in cruise
- Air mass flow: 860–880 kg/s (1,900–1,900 lb/s)
- Specific fuel consumption: 55.3 g/N/h (0.542 lb/lbf/h) at cruise
- Thrust-to-weight ratio: 5.07–5.63

=== Type designators ===
Rolls Royce RB211 Trent 500 variants
Variant	Certification	Max T/O	Max Cont.
RB211 Trent 553-61	9 February 1998	248.1 kN (55,775 lbf)	197.3 kN (44,355 lbf)
RB211 Trent 553A2-61	21 April 2002	248.1 kN (55,775 lbf)	197.3 kN (44,355 lbf)
RB211 Trent 556-61	9 February 1998	260 kN (58,450 lbf)	197.3 kN (44,355 lbf)
RB211 Trent 556A2-61	21 April 2002	260 kN (58,450 lbf)	197.3 kN (44,355 lbf)
RB211 Trent 560A2-61	21 April 2002	275.3 kN (61,890 lbf)	197.3 kN (44,355 lbf)

== See also ==
Related development

- Rolls-Royce Trent

Comparable engines

- General Electric CF6
- Pratt & Whitney PW4000

Related lists

- List of aircraft engines
