= List of Airbus A380 orders and deliveries =

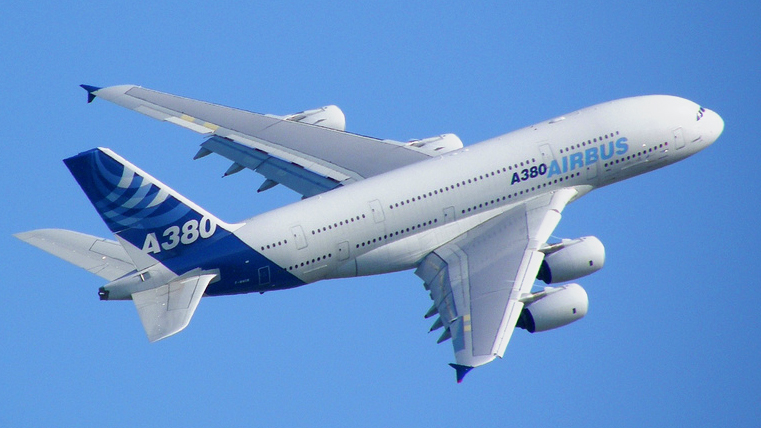
An A380-800 in its original Airbus livery

There are 251 firm orders by 14 customers for the passenger version of the Airbus A380-800, all of which have been delivered as of December 2021. There were originally also 27 orders for the freighter version, the A380F, but when this programme was frozen following production delays, 20 A380F orders were cancelled and the remaining seven were converted to A380-800s.

== Orders by customers ==
=== Overview ===
The following orders have been placed and deliveries made, from Airbus Orders & Deliveries data, since December 31, 2021:

Customer	Entry into service	Firm orders	Deliveries	EA	RR	Press release
Air France	2009	10	10	*		
All Nippon Airways	2019	3	3		*	
Asiana Airlines	2014	6	6		*	
British Airways	2013	12	12		*	
China Southern Airlines	2011	5	5		*	
Emirates	2008	123	123	90	33	
Etihad Airways	2014	10	10	*		
Korean Air	2011	10	10	*		
Lufthansa	2010	14	14		*	
Malaysia Airlines	2012	6	6		*	
Qantas	2008	12	12		*	
Qatar Airways	2014	10	10	*		
Singapore Airlines	2007	24	24		*	
Thai Airways International	2012	6	6		*	
Totals		251	251	130	121	

=== First deliveries to airlines ===
Airline	First delivery	Reference
Air France	30 October 2009	
All Nippon Airways	20 March 2019	
Asiana Airlines	26 May 2014	
British Airways	4 July 2013	
China Southern Airlines	14 October 2011	
Emirates	28 July 2008	
Etihad Airways	16 December 2014	
Korean Air	24 May 2011	
Lufthansa	19 May 2010	
Malaysia Airlines	29 May 2012	
Qantas	19 September 2008	
Qatar Airways	17 September 2014	
Singapore Airlines	15 October 2007	
Thai Airways International	27 September 2012	

=== Orders and deliveries graph ===
Data through 31 December 2021.^{[note]}

== Chronological orders ==
=== By year ===
Airbus A380 firm net orders and deliveries
		2001	2002	2003	2004	2005	2006	2007	2008	2009	2010	2011	2012	2013	2014	2015	2016	2017	2018	2019	2020	2021	Total
Net orders	A380-800	78	–	34	10	10	24	33	9	4	32	19	9	42	13	2	–	–2	4	–70	–	–	251
Net orders	A380F	7	10	–	–	10	-17	-10	–	–	–	–	–	–	–	–	–	–	–	–	–	–	0
Deliveries	A380-800	–	–	–	–	–	–	1	12	10	18	26	30	25	30	27	28	15	12	8	4	5	251

Cumulative orders and deliveries

Orders Deliveries — Data from Airbus as of December 2021.

=== Details ===
Order				Type		Options	Engine		Press Release/Update
Announced	Firmed	Customer	EIS	800	800F	Options	EA	RR	Press Release/Update
30 April 2000	4 November 2001	Emirates	2008	5	2	5	*		
24 July 2000	18 June 2001	Air France	2009	10		4	*		
25 July 2000	19 June 2001	ILFC	2014	5	5	4	*		
29 September 2000	12 July 2001	Singapore Airlines	2007	10		15		*	
29 November 2000	6 March 2001	Qantas	2008	12		12		*	
15 December 2000	26 April 2001	Virgin Atlantic	2015	6		6		*	
16 January 2001	12 July 2002	FedEx Express	2010		10	10	*		
27 February 2001	9 December 2003	Qatar Airways	2014	2		2	*		
4 November 2001	4 November 2001	Emirates	2008	15		5	*		
6 December 2001	20 December 2001	Lufthansa	2010	15		5		*	
10 January 2003	11 December 2003	Malaysia Airlines	2012	6				*	
16 June 2003	16 June 2003	Emirates	2008	21		-10	*		
18 June 2003	23 October 2003	Korean Air	2011	5		3	*		
20 July 2004	20 December 2004	Etihad Airways	2014	4			*		
27 August 2004	28 December 2004	Thai Airways International	2012	6				*	
11 January 2005	13 December 2005	UPS Airlines	2012		10	10	*		
28 January 2005	21 April 2005	China Southern Airlines	2011	5				*	
15 June 2005	15 June 2005	Kingfisher Airlines	2016	5		5	NA		
April 2006	May 2006	Emirates	2008	2	-2		*		
21 July 2006	20 December 2006	Singapore Airlines	2007	9		-9		*	
29 October 2006	21 December 2006	Qantas	2008	8		8		*	
27 November 2006	order cancelled	FedEx Express	NA		-10	-10	*		
4 December 2006	31 December 2006	ILFC	2014	5	-5		*		
2 March 2007	order cancelled	UPS Airlines	NA		-10	-10	*		
7 May 2007	7 May 2007	Emirates	2008	4			*		
24 May 2007	18 June 2007	Air France	2009	2		-2	*		
18 June 2007	18 June 2007	Qatar Airways	2014	3		-2	*		
18 June 2007	11 November 2007	Emirates	2008	8			*		
27 September 2007	27 September 2007	British Airways	2013	12		7		*	
11 November 2007	11 November 2007	Emirates	2008	3			*		
12 November 2007	12 November 2007	Kingdom Holding Company	2012	1				*	
13 February 2008	19 February 2008	Korean Air	2011	3		-3	*		
14 July 2008	order cancelled	Etihad Airways	2014	-4			*		
14 July 2008	14 July 2008	Etihad Airways	2014	10		5	*		
15 January 2009	17 November 2009	Air Austral	2014	2			*		
3 February 2009	3 February 2009	Korean Air	2011	2			*		
8 June 2010	8 June 2010	Emirates		32			*		
8 November 2010	17 February 2011	Skymark Airlines	2014	4		2		*	
6 January 2011	6 January 2011	Asiana Airlines	2014	6		4		*	
8 March 2011	order cancelled	ILFC	NA	-10		-4	*		
8 November 2010	23 June 2011	Skymark Airlines	2014	2		-2		*	
29 September 2011	13 October 2011	Lufthansa	2010	2		-2		*	
15 November 2011	15 November 2011	Qatar Airways	2014	5		3	*		
23 June 2011	19 December 2011	Hong Kong Airlines	2015	10			NA		
23 June 2011	17 August 2012	Hong Kong Airlines	2015			-10	NA		
28 October 2011	21 June 2012	Transaero Airlines	2015	4			*		
24 October 2012	24 October 2012	Singapore Airlines	2017	5		-5		*	
20 September 2013	order cancelled	Lufthansa	NA	-3				*	
17 November 2013	23 December 2013	Emirates	2016	50				*	
31 December 2013	order cancelled	Kingfisher Airlines	NA	-5			NA		
17 June 2013	12 February 2014	Amedeo	2016	20			NA		
29 July 2014	order cancelled	Skymark Airlines	NA	-6				*	
5 February 2015	order cancelled	Kingdom Holding Company	NA	-1				*	
	order cancelled	Transaero Airlines	NA	-4			*		
		Air Accord	NA	3			NA		
	29 January 2016	All Nippon Airways	2019	3				*	
12 April 2016	order cancelled	Air Austral	NA	-2			*		
13 April 2016		Emirates	2017	2				*	
10 February 2017	order cancelled	Air France	NA	-2			*		
18 January 2018	11 February 2018	Emirates	2020	20		16	NA		
7 March 2018	order cancelled	Virgin Atlantic	NA	-6		-6		*	
31 December 2018	order cancelled	Hong Kong Airlines	NA	-10			NA		
7 February 2019	order cancelled	Qantas	NA	-8				*	
14 February 2019	order cancelled	Emirates	NA	-20		-16	NA		
14 February 2019	order cancelled	Emirates	NA	-19				*	
14 February 2019	order cancelled	Amedeo	NA	-20			NA		
28 February 2019	order cancelled	Air Accord	NA	-3			NA		
sub-totals				251	0	40	130	121	
totals				251		40	251		

Legend
symbol	meaning
?	date unknown
EA	Engine Alliance GP7200
RR	Rolls-Royce Trent 900
TBA	to be announced
NA	not available or not applicable
EIS	entry into service

== Models ==
type	Type certified EASA / FAA	engine	manufacturer	max take-off thrust	Engine certified	
type	Type certified EASA / FAA	engine	manufacturer	max take-off thrust	EASA	FAA
A380-841	12 December 2006	Trent 970-84	Rolls-Royce	334.29 kN / 75,152 lb	29 October 2004	4 December 2006
A380-841	12 December 2006	Trent 970B-84	Rolls-Royce	348.31 kN / 78,304 lb	29 October 2004	4 December 2006
A380-842	12 December 2006	Trent 972-84	Rolls-Royce	341.41 kN / 76,752 lb	11 August 2005	4 December 2006
A380-842	12 December 2006	Trent 972B-84	Rolls-Royce	356.81 kN / 80,213 lb	11 August 2005	4 December 2006
A380-843F	NA	Trent 977-84	Rolls-Royce	359.33 kN / 80,781 lb	29 October 2004	4 December 2006
A380-843F	NA	Trent 977B-84	Rolls-Royce	372.92 kN / 83,835 lb	29 October 2004	4 December 2006
A380-861	14 December 2007	GP7270	Engine Alliance	322.44 kN / 74,735 lb	19 April 2007	29 December 2005
A380-863F	NA	GP7277	Engine Alliance	357.15 kN / 80,290 lb	19 April 2007	29 December 2005
A380-941	NA	Trent 980-84	Rolls-Royce	374.09 kN / 84,098 lb	29 October 2004	4 December 2006

=== Variants ===
Variant (Modification Number)	A380-8XX-000 (Basic)	A380-8XX-001 (64636)	A380-8XX-002 (64605)	A380-8XX-003 (66611)	A380-8XX-004 (69439)	A380-8XX-005 (69879)
MRW (Maximum Ramp Weight)	562 t (1,239,000 lb)	512 t (1,128,700 lb)	571 t (1,258,800 lb)	512 t (1,128,700 lb)	562 t (1,239,000 lb)	562 t (1,239,000 lb)
MTOW (Maximum Take-off Weight)	560 t (1,234,600 lb)	510 t (1,124,400 lb)	569 t (1,254,400 lb)	510 t (1,124,400 lb)	560 t (1,234,600 lb)	560 t (1,234,600 lb)
MLW (Maximum Landing Weight)	386 t (850,980 lb)	394 t (868,620 lb)	391 t (862,010 lb)	395 t	391 t (862,010 lb)	383 t
MZFW (Maximum Zero Fuel Weight)	361 t (795,870 lb)	372 t (820,120 lb)	366 t (806,890 lb)	373 t	366 t (806,890 lb)	366 t (806,890 lb)

== See also ==
- List of Airbus A380 operators
- List of Boeing 747 operators
- List of Airbus A350 orders and deliveries
- List of Boeing 787 orders and deliveries
