= Gulf carrier =

Gulf carrier can refer to:

- An airline based in a country in the Persian Gulf region, but typically used to refer to the four major carriers:

- Saudia (airline), based in Jeddah, Kingdom of Saudi Arabia
- Emirates (airline), based in Dubai, United Arab Emirates
- Etihad Airways, based in Abu Dhabi, United Arab Emirates
- Qatar Airways, based in Doha, Qatar

Others with considerable operations in the same region:

- Riyadh Air, based in Riyadh, Saudi Arabia
- Gulf Air, based in Bahrain
- Kuwait Airways, based in Kuwait City, Kuwait
- Oman Air, based in Muscat, Oman
