= Air France Flight 066 =

2017 aviation accident caused by an engine failure

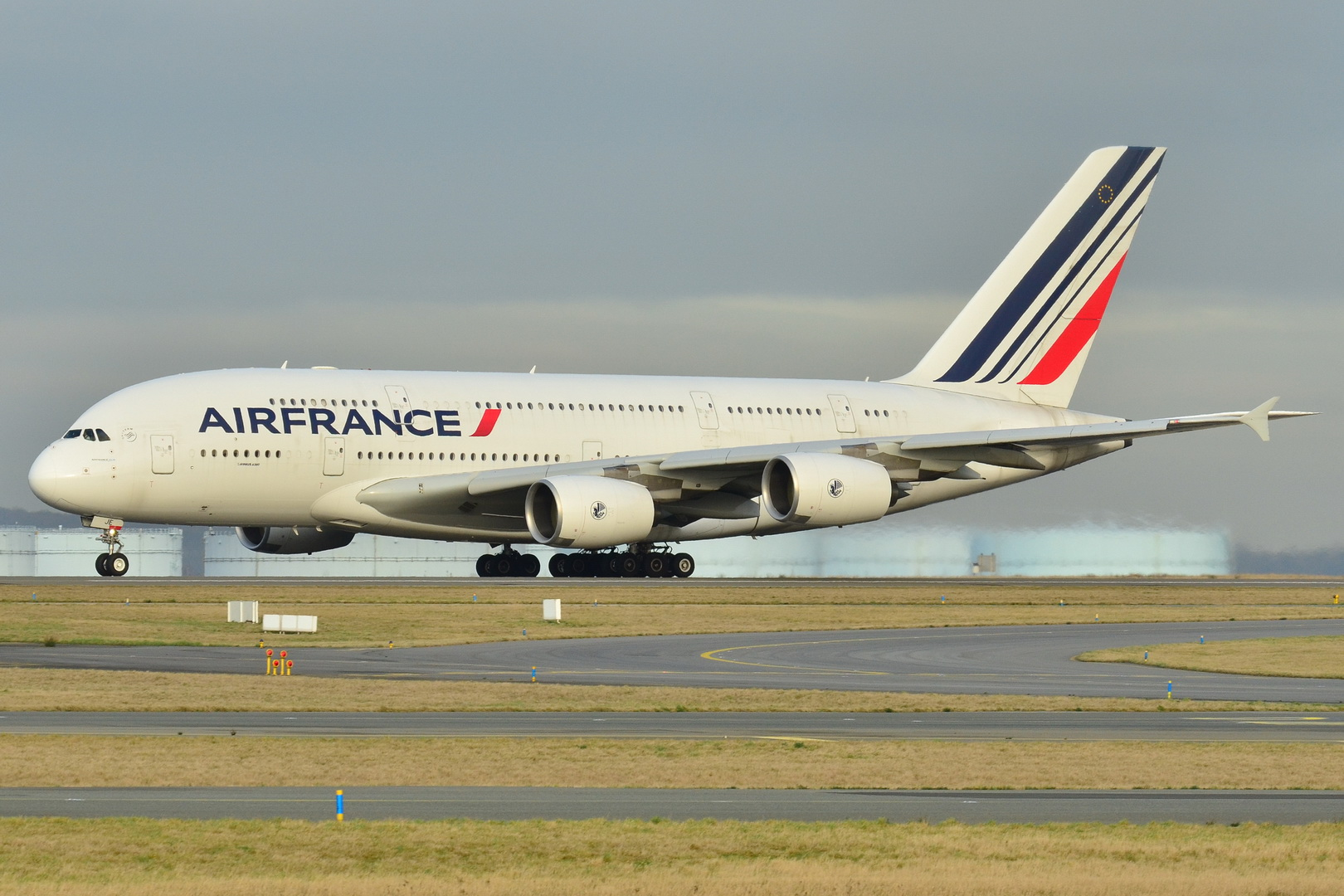
- F-HPJE, the aircraft involved in the accident, seen in 2011

Accident
- Date: 30 September 2017
- Summary: Diversion following uncontained engine failure in cruise
- Site: 150 km (90 mi) southeast of Paamiut, Greenland

Aircraft
- Aircraft type: Airbus A380-861
- Operator: Air France
- IATA flight No.: AF066
- ICAO flight No.: AFR066
- Call sign: AIRFRANS 066
- Registration: F-HPJE
- Flight origin: Charles de Gaulle International Airport, Paris, France
- Destination: Los Angeles International Airport, Los Angeles, California, U.S.
- Occupants: 521
- Passengers: 497
- Crew: 24
- Fatalities: 0
- Survivors: 521 (all)

Air France Flight 066 was a scheduled international passenger flight from Paris Charles de Gaulle Airport to Los Angeles International Airport, operated by Air France and using an Airbus A380. On 30 September 2017, the aircraft suffered an uncontained engine failure and made an emergency landing at Goose Bay Airport, Canada. While the aircraft was in cruise flight 150 kilometres (93 mi; 81 nmi) southeast of Paamiut, Greenland, the outboard right-side Engine Alliance GP7200 engine failed, with the fan hub and intake separating from the aircraft. An accident investigation report was published by the French Bureau of Enquiry and Analysis for Civil Aviation Safety (BEA) in September 2020; the investigation determined that the engine failure was caused by a crack in the fan hub due to "cold dwell" metal fatigue.

This was the second of two uncontained engine failures suffered by the Airbus A380 type, following that of a Rolls-Royce Trent 900 engine on Qantas Flight 32 in 2010.

== Engine failure ==
The aircraft diverted to CFB Goose Bay, a military air base also used for civilian flights, and landed at 15:42 UTC (12:42 local time) after suffering an uncontained failure on its number 4 (rightmost) engine while flying 150 kilometres (93 mi; 81 nmi) southeast of Paamiut, Greenland. The engine had operated 30,769 hours (3,534 cycles from cold startup to operational temperature) at the time of the incident.

There were no reported injuries or fatalities among the 497 passengers and 24 crew on board. Passengers were not allowed to disembark from the A380 until another Air France aircraft and a chartered aircraft arrived the next morning (1 October), because the airport (located on a Royal Canadian Air Force base) is not equipped to accommodate a large number of international passengers from commercial aircraft. The Air France aircraft (a Boeing 777) landed at Atlanta, requiring a wait for its passengers to board another flight while the chartered Boeing 737 aircraft took passengers directly to Los Angeles with a refuelling stopover at Winnipeg.

Pictures and video of the damaged engine taken by passengers and of the landing by an observer on the ground were posted to social media.

== Aircraft ==
The aircraft involved was a 7-year-old Airbus A380-861, registration F-HPJE with the Manufacturer's Serial Number MSN 052, powered by four Engine Alliance GP7200 turbofan engines, having made its first flight on 10 August 2010, and was delivered to Air France on 17 May 2011. At the time of the accident, the aircraft had accumulated a total of 27,184 flight hours. Eventually, the aircraft was repaired and went back to service on 15 January 2018, but was later retired in May 2020 due to the COVID-19 pandemic. As of June 2021, the aircraft has been returned to its lessor, the Dr. Peters Group, and is being stored at Tarbes–Lourdes–Pyrénées Airport.

== Investigation ==
Air France issued a press release stating that an investigation was underway to determine the cause of the engine failure, including representatives of the Bureau of Enquiry and Analysis for Civil Aviation Safety (BEA, the French aviation accident investigation bureau), Airbus and Air France. The Transportation Safety Board of Canada is responsible for investigating aviation accidents in Canada and planned to send investigators. However, since the incident occurred over Greenland, the Danish Accident Investigation Board had jurisdiction over the investigation.

On 3 October 2017 the Danish aviation authorities delegated the investigation to the BEA. Investigators from Denmark, the US and Canada joined the investigation. Advisors from Airbus, Air France and Engine Alliance (a partnership between General Electric and Pratt & Whitney) also flew to Goose Bay. The first observation was that the engine's fan hub had detached during the flight and dragged the air inlet with it. Some six days later, debris from the aircraft's engine was recovered in Greenland.

The BEA stated that "the recovery of the missing parts, especially of the fan hub fragments, was the key to supporting the investigation" and initiated a large search operation including synthetic-aperture radar overflights on a Dassault Falcon 20, but failed to locate the crucial components in 2018, before returning in 2019.

In July 2019, another missing piece of the engine, weighing 150 kilograms (330 lb), was located in Greenland and recovered. The fan hub impact is believed to have made a small crater in the ice sheet that quickly filled with snow before initial search activities. The search and recovery for this missing fan hub took almost two years, with multiple search campaigns using different ice-penetrating radar and transient electromagnetic anomaly technologies. It was ultimately recovered from 4 m depth in a large crevasse field. This search and recovery campaign was featured in the documentary "The Sky Detectives".

The BEA released its final report in September 2020, indicating that the engine failed from a crack in the Ti-6-4 alloy fan hub caused by cold dwell fatigue cracking.

== Subsequent action ==
On 12 October 2017, the American Federal Aviation Administration (FAA) issued an Emergency Airworthiness Directive (EAD) affecting all Engine Alliance GP7270, GP7272 and GP7277 engines. The EAD required a visual inspection of the fan hub within a timescale of two to eight weeks, depending on the number of cycles an engine had operated since new. In June 2018 the FAA issued another Airworthiness Directive, requiring eddy-current testing of the fan hubs of GP7200 engines, to check for cracks in the slots in the hub that serve to attach the fan blades.

In August 2019, the BEA announced that a part from the fan hub recovered from Greenland had been examined by the manufacturer Engine Alliance under BEA supervision. Metallurgical examination of the recovered titanium fan hub fragment identified a subsurface fatigue crack origin. The fracture was initiated in a microtextured area approximately in the middle of the slot bottom. Examination of the fracture was ongoing. Meanwhile, Engine Alliance informed affected A380 operators that an engine inspection campaign would be launched soon.

== Recovery and repair ==
Air France originally announced plans to ferry the aircraft back to Europe for repair, with an inoperable replacement engine installed, for reasons of weight and balance. Such a flight requires special operating procedures, and thus rehearsal by the crew in a simulator. That plan was revised and the aircraft was ferried back from Goose Bay Airport to Charles de Gaulle Airport on 6 December 2017 using four operational engines and an Air France crew. The damaged engine was flown to East Midlands Airport in the United Kingdom for examination by General Electric during the period 23–25 November 2017. The aircraft returned to service on 15 January 2018 and continued to fly until Air France retired its A380 fleet in May 2020, due to the COVID-19 pandemic.

Recovery of the fan hub from the Greenland ice sheet took place on 29–30 June 2019 after 20 months and four phases of complex aerial and ground search operations to locate the various elements from the engine, finding large components under many meters of ice.
