= ME3 carriers =

Three largest airlines in the Gulf region

The ME3 carriers are commonly referred to as ME3, the Big Three, or more generally, the three major full-service airlines from the Gulf region in the Middle East. They are known globally for their massive capacity growth and luxurious in-cabin service, utilizing a hub and spoke model:

- Emirates, an airline based in Dubai International Airport in Dubai, United Arab Emirates, this airport is the biggest of the three. It is recognized for its extensive collection of wide-body aircraft, featuring the famous Airbus A380 double-decker models. It is also the world's largest operator of Airbus A380s and is known for its ultra-luxury service and luxurious in-flight lounges.
- Qatar Airways, an airline based in Hamad International Airport in Doha, Qatar. It is regularly listed as one of the world's leading airlines, has a massive route network and is a member of the oneworld airline alliance.
- Etihad Airways, an airline based in Zayed International Airport, in Abu Dhabi, the capital city of the United Arab Emirates. Although it is a bit smaller than the two nearby airports, it is known for its premium services and for linking travelers worldwide through a well-planned web of international alliances.

These airlines are recognized for their swift global growth, emphasis on luxury travel, and large hub-and-spoke systems that link long-distance flights worldwide. By leveraging the strategic location of the Arabian Peninsula, these airlines have transformed international air travel, enabling connections between Europe, the Americas, Africa, Asia and Oceania with just one stopover.
