= Rolls-Royce Trent 900 =

2000s British turbofan aircraft engine

Trent 900
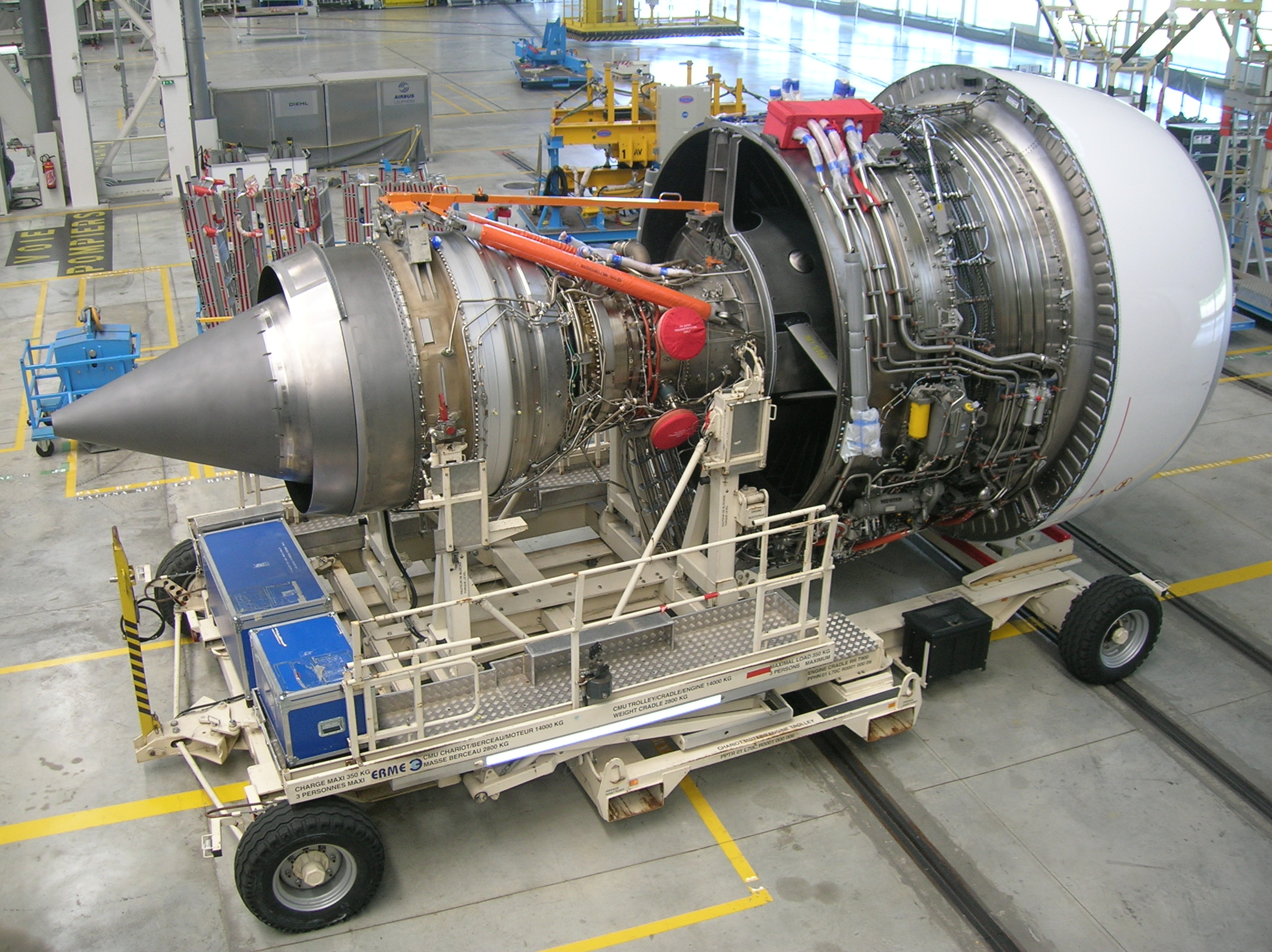
- Type: Turbofan
- National origin: United Kingdom
- Manufacturer: Rolls-Royce Holdings
- First run: 18 March 2003
- Major applications: Airbus A380
- Developed from: Rolls-Royce Trent 800
- Developed into: Rolls-Royce Trent 1000

The Rolls-Royce Trent 900 is a high-bypass turbofan produced by Rolls-Royce plc to power the Airbus A380, competing with the Engine Alliance GP7000. Initially proposed for the Boeing 747-500/600X in July 1996, this first application was later abandoned but was offered for the Airbus A3XX, launched as the A380 in December 2000. It first ran on 18 March 2003, made its maiden flight on 17 May 2004 on an Airbus A340 testbed, and was certified by the EASA on 29 October 2004. Producing up to 374 kN (84,000 lbf) of thrust, the Trent 900 has the three shaft architecture of the Rolls-Royce Trent family with a 2.95 m (116 in) fan. It has a 8.5–8.7:1 bypass ratio and a 37–39:1 overall pressure ratio.

== Development ==
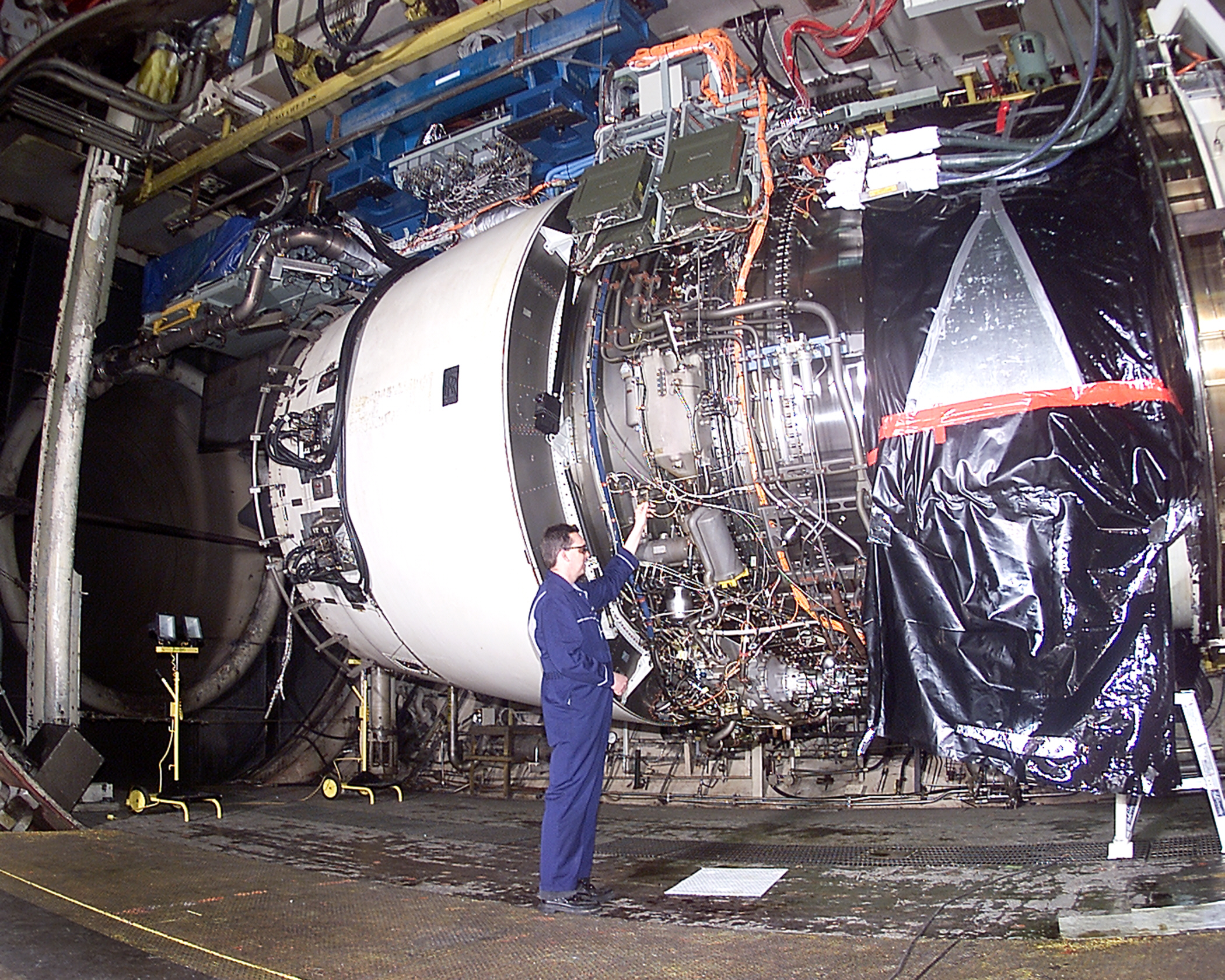
A Trent 900 on test at the Arnold Engineering Development Complex

In July 1996, Rolls-Royce offered the Trent 900 for the proposed Boeing 747-500/600X, targeting a 2000 service entry and competing with the General Electric/Pratt & Whitney Engine Alliance. With a scaled-down Rolls-Royce Trent 800 core and a similar 2.8 m (110 in) fan, increasing bypass ratio from 6.5 to 8.5, the 345–365 kN (78,000–82,000 lbf) engine could also power the Airbus A3XX. The $450 million development aimed for a December 1999 certification but the 747X was later abandoned, leaving the Airbus A3XX, its Airbus competitor, as a possible application from 2003.

By July 2000, the Trent 900 was the first engine to be ordered for the A3XX, by then with a swept fan. By September, its design was not frozen and the fan diameter could increase by up to 13 cm (5 in) for a 68,000 to 80,000 lbf (300 to 360 kN) thrust. The A3XX was launched as the A380 on 19 December 2000, and the Trent 900 was selected by Singapore Airlines and Virgin Atlantic over the competing GP7200. The Trent 900 ran for the first time on 18 March 2003, achieving its certification thrust of 81,000 lbf (360 kN) on 2 April and attaining 88,000 lbf (390 kN) a week later, with growth room to 94,000 lbf (420 kN). Its 300 cm (118 in) fan comes from the Rolls-Royce Trent 8104 demonstrator, and a contra-rotating HP spool is used for the first time, for up to 2% better efficiency.

The Trent 900 made its maiden flight on 17 May 2004 on Airbus's A340-300 testbed, replacing the port inner CFM56 engine. Its final certification was granted by the EASA on 29 October 2004, and the FAA on 4 December 2006. After a twelve-month suspension caused by delays to the A380, Rolls-Royce announced in October 2007 that production of the Trent 900 had been restarted. On 27 September 2007, British Airways announced the selection of the Trent 900 to power 12 A380 aircraft, helping to take the engine's share of the A380 engine market to 52% at the end of February 2009.

== Design ==
The Trent 900 is an axial flow, high bypass turbofan with the three coaxial shafts of the Rolls-Royce Trent family. The 2.95 m (116 in) fan with swept blades is driven by a 5-stage LP turbine, the 8-stage IP compressor and the 6-stage HP compressor are both powered by a single stage turbine, with the HP spool rotating in the opposite direction of the others. It has a single annular combustor and is controlled by an EEC. It is certified for thrusts between 334.29–374.09 kN (75,150–84,100 lbf).

Its swept-back fan is inherited from the Rolls-Royce Trent 8104 demonstrator and a contra-rotating HP spool is used for the first time. It features a scaled-down Rolls-Royce Trent 800 core. It can be transported on a Boeing 747 freighter whole, the only A380 engine capable of being transported this way.

== Variants ==
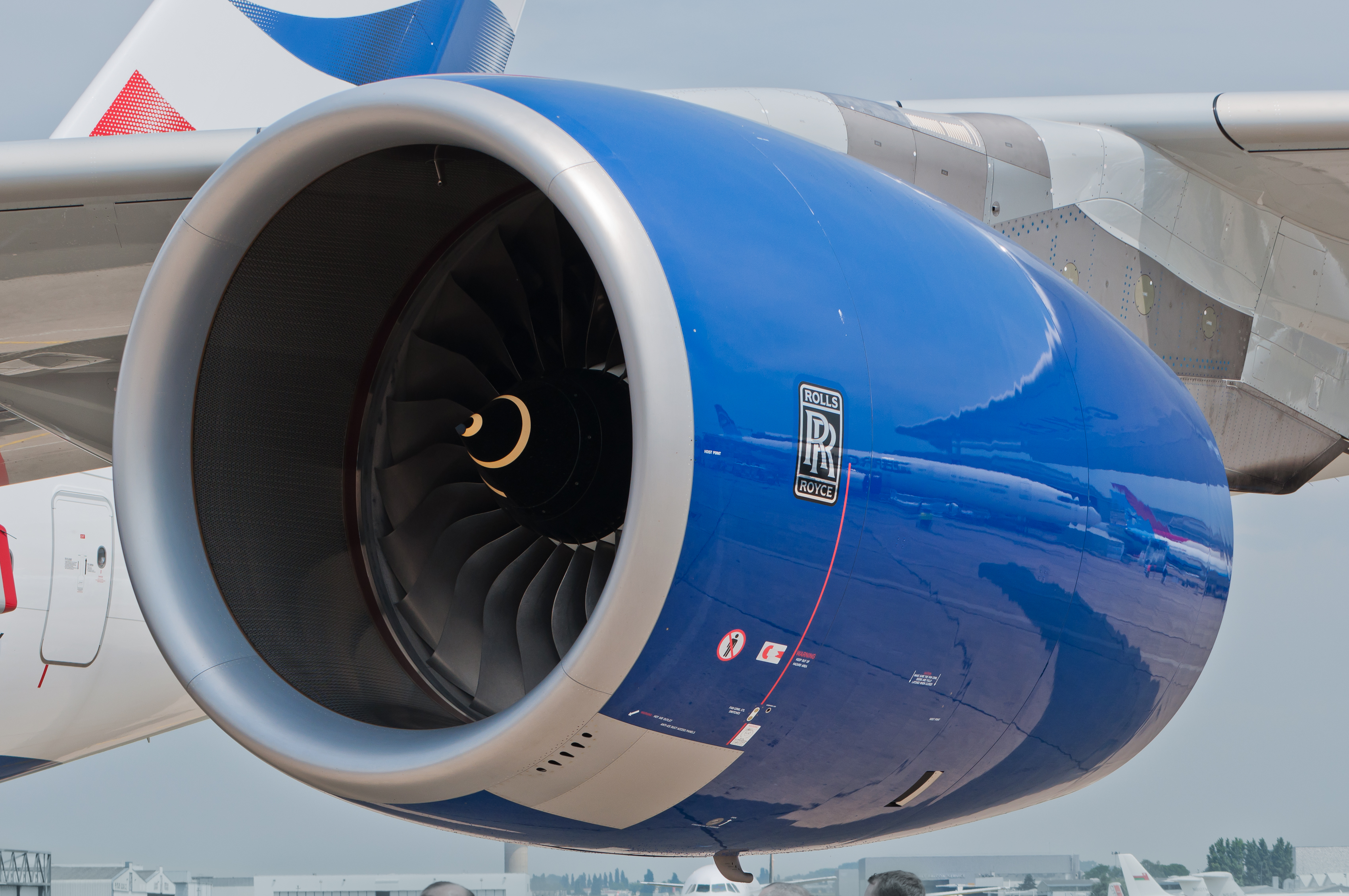
Rolls-Royce Trent 970B-84 on a British Airways A380

Thrust kN (lbf)
Variant	Take-off	Maximum Continuous
Trent 970-84	334.29 (75,152)	319.60 (71,850)
Trent 972-84	341.41 (76,752)	319.60 (71,850)
Trent 970B-84	348.31 (78,304)	319.60 (71,850)
Trent 972B-84	356.81 (80,213)	319.60 (71,850)
Trent 977-84	359.33 (80,781)	319.60 (71,850)
Trent 977B-84	372.92 (83,835)	319.60 (71,850)
Trent 980-84	374.09 (84,098)	319.60 (71,850)
Trent 972E-84	341.41 (76,752)	319.60 (71,850)

== Upgrades ==
The Trent 900 family of engines had their first set of upgrades marketed as the Trent 900EP; these were available for delivery from 2012. This package delivered a 1% saving on fuel burn compared to non EP engines. Rolls-Royce told Aviation Week and Space Technology that the upgrades were intended in most cases for both new engines and as retrofits. This upgrade is based on advancements made during the development of the Rolls-Royce Trent XWB for the Airbus A350 XWB and matches improvements made for the Rolls-Royce Trent 700 called the Trent 700EP. Block 1 includes elliptical leading edges in the compressor, smaller low-pressure turbine tip clearances, and new coating for the high-pressure compressor drum, as well as an upgrade to the engine control (FADEC) software.

The EP2 package entered testing in May 2013 and was scheduled to be available for delivery in mid 2014. This package aims to provide a further 0.8% reduction in fuel burn on top of the improvements offered by the EP package. Changes include better sealing of the low-pressure turbine, improvements to fan blade tip clearances, and other changes derived from the engines developed for the Boeing 787 and Airbus A350. EP2 passed a type certificate test by European Aviation Safety Agency on 27 November 2013 and an update type certificate was issued on 11 December 2013.

Another modernization was introduced in 2016 with the EP3 package.

== Applications ==
- Airbus A380

== Incidents ==
=== Qantas QF32 uncontained engine failure ===
Qantas Flight 32 was a regularly scheduled passenger flight from London to Sydney via Singapore. On 4 November 2010, the Airbus A380 operating the route suffered an uncontained failure in one of its four Rolls-Royce Trent 900 engines. The failure occurred over the Riau Islands, Indonesia, four minutes after takeoff from Singapore Changi Airport. After holding for almost two hours to assess the situation, the aircraft made a successful emergency landing at Changi. No injuries occurred to the passengers, crew, or people on the ground, despite debris from the aircraft falling onto houses in Batam.

On inspection, it was found that a turbine disc in the aircraft's number-two engine (on the port side nearer the fuselage) had disintegrated, causing extensive damage to the nacelle, wing, fuel system, landing gear, flight controls, and engine controls, and a fire in a fuel tank that self-extinguished. The subsequent investigation concluded that the failure had been caused by the breaking of a stub oil pipe, which had been manufactured improperly.

The failure was the first of its kind for the A380, the world's largest passenger aircraft. At the time of the accident, 39 A380s were operating with five airlines: Qantas, Air France, Emirates, Lufthansa, and Singapore Airlines. The accident led to the temporary grounding of the rest of the six-plane Qantas A380 fleet. It also led to groundings, inspections, and engine replacements on some other Rolls-Royce-powered A380s in service with Lufthansa and Singapore Airlines, but not in the A380 fleets of Air France or Emirates, which were powered by Engine Alliance engines.

== Cost ==
In 2000 Qantas were quoted a price of US$12.85 million per Trent 900. In 2015 the airline Emirates signed a contract for 200 Trent 900s including long-term service support at a cost of US$9.2 billion or US$46 million per engine. In 2016 ANA bought engines for three new Airbus A380 aircraft for $300m: $25m per Trent 900. A new set of LLPs is worth $7 million and an overhaul costs slightly more.

== Specifications (Trent 900) ==
Data from EASA

==== General characteristics ====
- Type: Three-shaft high bypass turbofan engine
- Length: 5,478 mm (215.7 in) tip of spinner minus rubber tip to Tail Bearing Housing Plug Mount Flange
- Diameter: 2,950 mm (116 in) fan
- Dry weight: 6,246 kg (13,770 lb)

==== Components ====
- Compressor: single stage LP (fan), 8-stage IP axial compressor (IPC), 6-stage HP axial compressor (HPC)
- Combustors: Single annular combustor
- Turbine: single stage HP turbine (HPT), single stage IP turbine (IPT), 5-stage LP turbine (LPT)

==== Performance ====
- Maximum thrust: 334.29 to 374.09 kN (75,152 to 84,098 lbf)
- Overall pressure ratio: 37–39
- Bypass ratio: 8.5–8.7
- Air mass flow: 1,204–1,245 kg (2,655–2,745 lb)/sec
- Specific fuel consumption: 16 g/(kN⋅s) (0.56 lb/(lbf⋅h)) in cruise (Mach 0.85, altitude 10,668 m (35,000 ft))
- Thrust-to-weight ratio: 5.46–6.11

== See also ==
Related development

- Rolls-Royce RB211

Comparable engines

- Engine Alliance GP7000
- General Electric GEnx

Related lists

- List of aircraft engines
