= Engine Alliance =

American aircraft engine manufacturer

Engine Alliance, LLC
- Type: Joint venture
- Industry: Aerospace
- Founded: August 1996; 30 years ago
- Headquarters: East Hartford, Connecticut, United States
- Key people: Dean Athans (president); Mike Zapatka (CFO)
- Products: Aircraft engines
- Owners: Pratt & Whitney (50%); GE Aerospace (50%)
- Website: www.enginealliance.com

The Engine Alliance (EA) is an American aircraft engine manufacturer based in East Hartford, Connecticut. The company is a 50/50 joint venture between GE Aerospace and Pratt & Whitney, a subsidiary of RTX. Engine Alliance was established in August 1996 to develop, manufacture, sell, and support a family of aircraft engines for new high-capacity, long-range aircraft.

The main application for such an engine, the GP7100, was originally for the Boeing 747-500/600X projects, before these were cancelled due to lack of demand from airlines.

Instead, the GP7000 has been re-optimized for use on the Airbus A380 superjumbo. In that market it competed with the Rolls-Royce Trent 900, the launch engine for the aircraft. The two EA variants are the GP7270 and the GP7277.

On September 30, 2017, an Engine Alliance GP7270 engine suffered from an uncontained failure during the passenger flight of Air France Flight 66.
