= Rolls-Royce Trent 700 =

1990s British turbofan aircraft engine

Trent 700
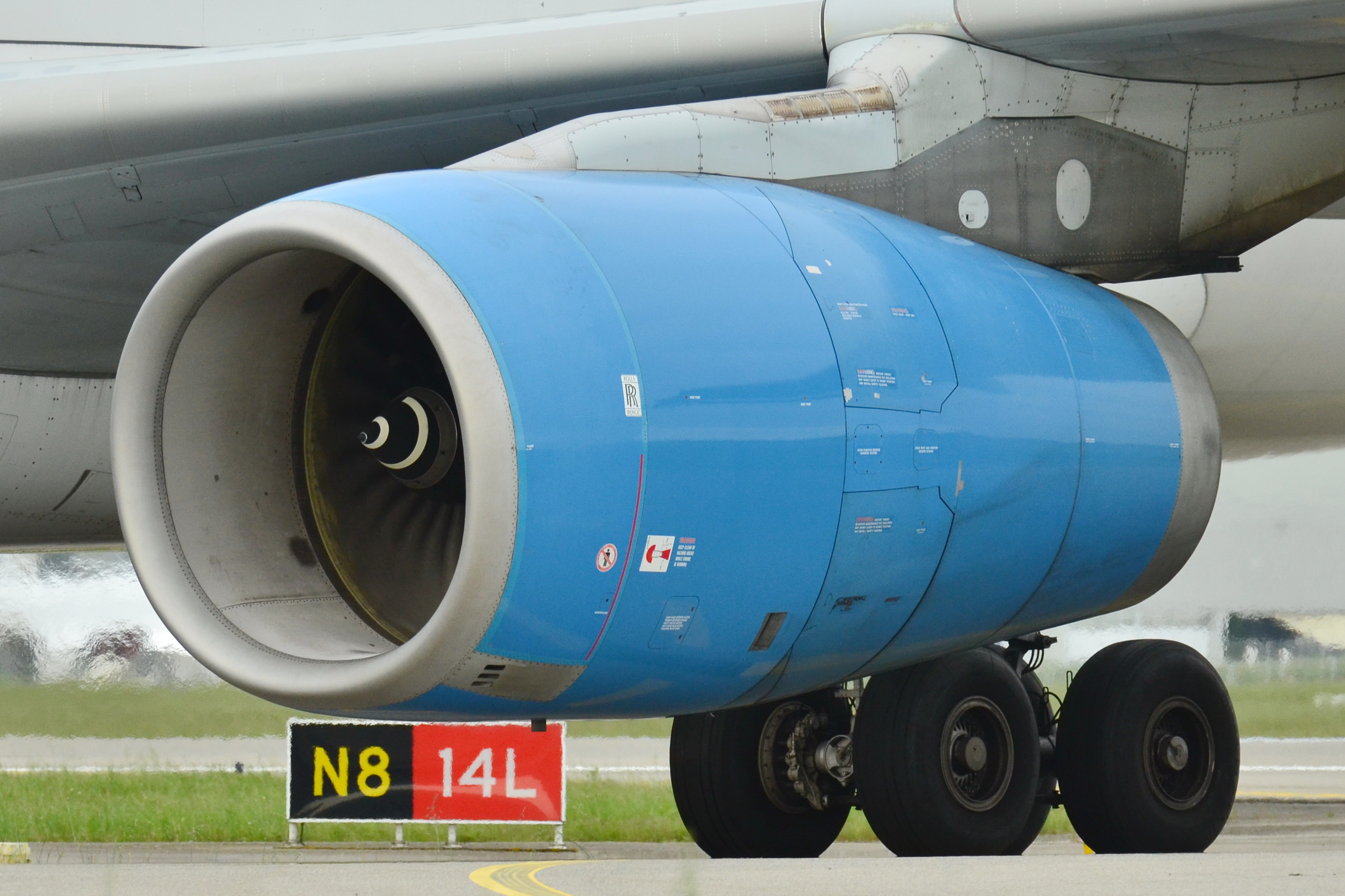
- The Airbus A330's nacelle features a common nozzle assembly
- Type: Turbofan
- National origin: United Kingdom
- Manufacturer: Rolls-Royce
- First run: August 1992
- Major applications: Airbus A330; Airbus Beluga XL; Airbus A330 MRTT
- Manufactured: 1992-present
- Developed from: Rolls-Royce RB211
- Developed into: Rolls-Royce Trent 800

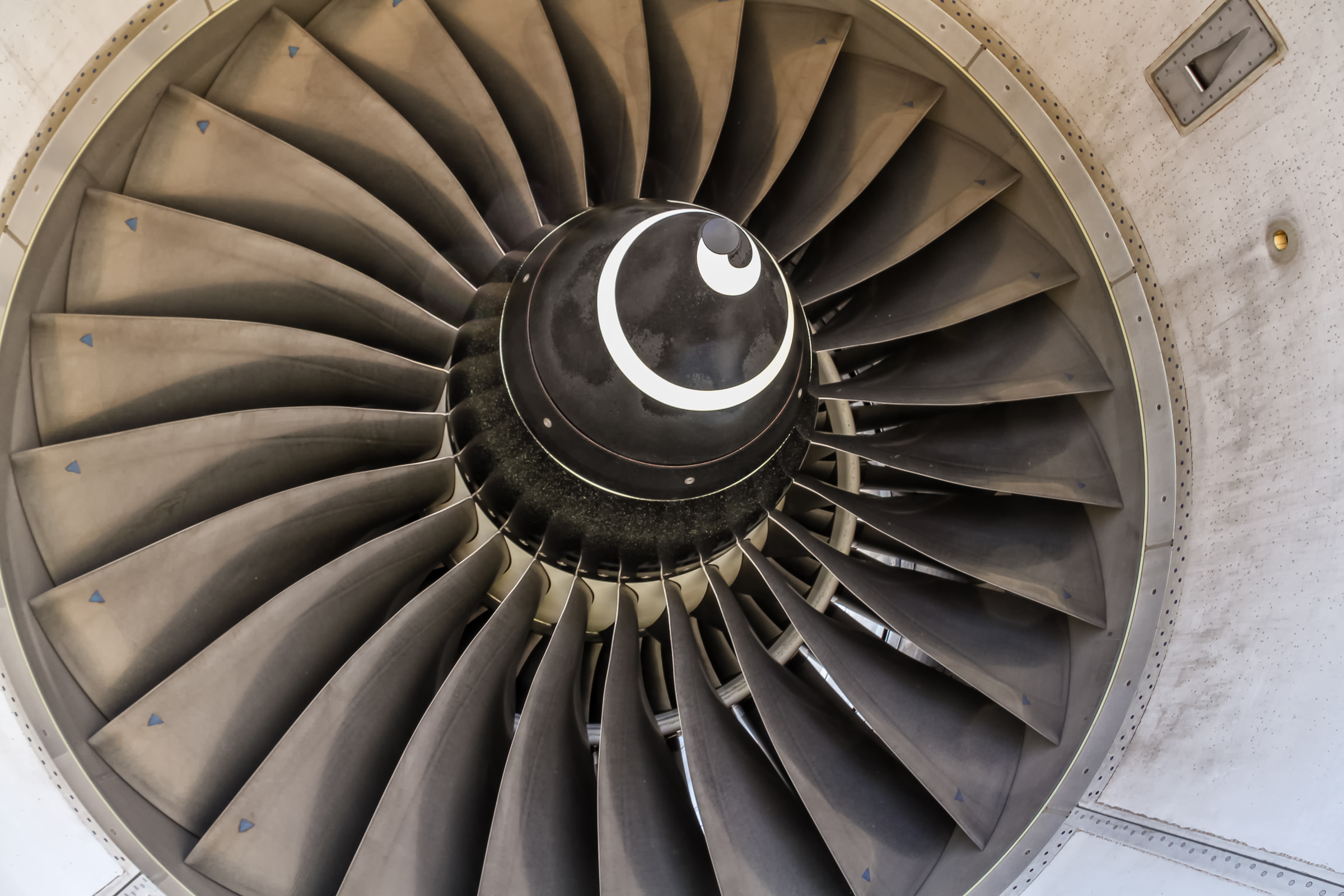
The 97.4 in (247 cm) fan with 26 blades gives a 5:1 bypass ratio

The Rolls-Royce Trent 700 is a high-bypass turbofan aircraft engine produced by Rolls-Royce plc to power the Airbus A330. Rolls-Royce was studying a RB211 development for the A330 at its launch in June 1987. It was first selected by Cathay Pacific in April 1989, first ran in summer 1992, was certified in January 1994 and was put into service on 24 March 1995. Keeping the characteristic three-shaft architecture of the RB211, it is the first variant of the Trent family. With its 97.4 in (247 cm) fan for a 5:1 bypass ratio, it produces 300.3–316.3 kN (67,500–71,100 lbf) of thrust and reaches an overall pressure ratio of 36:1. It competes with the General Electric CF6-80E1 and the PW4000 to power the A330.

== Development ==
When Airbus launched its A330 twin-jet in June 1987, its only engine options included the General Electric CF6-80C2 and the Pratt & Whitney PW4000. Rolls-Royce was studying whether to launch a RB211-700, 65,000 lbf (290 kN) development of the RB211 for the A330, the long-range Boeing 767 and McDonnell Douglas MD-11, derived from the Boeing 747-400's -524D4D, with growth potential to 70,000 lbf (310 kN). By June 1988, Rolls-Royce was investing over $540 million to develop the uprated RB-211-524L with a new 95 in (240 cm) fan up from 86 in (220 cm) for the -524G/H and a fourth LP turbine stage up from three, targeting 65,000 to 70,000 lbf (290 to 310 kN).

In April 1989, Cathay Pacific ordered ten A330s, powered by 65,000 lbf (290 kN) RB211-524L engines and with room to grow to 80,000 lbf (360 kN), a first for Rolls-Royce on an Airbus aircraft. In June 1989, TWA confirmed an order for twenty A330s and selected the RB211-524L Trent engine for $620 million (15.5 million each), rated for 74,000 lbf (330 kN).

By February 1992, design work was completed for the 97.4 in (247 cm) fan, 67,000–72,000 lbf (300–320 kN) Trent 700 and the first test was scheduled for July. By then, the earlier 94.6 in (240 cm) fan, 65,000–67,000 lbf (290–300 kN) Trent 600 for the MD-11 was abandoned due to lack of customers. By September, the first engine was running and was to be joined by five others by the end of the year. Certification was applied for on 30 June 1991 and was granted on 24 January 1994. The first Trent 700-powered A330 flew in August 1994, and Cathay Pacific introduced it in March 1995. 90-minutes ETOPS approval was achieved in March 1995, and this was extended to 120 minutes in December 1995 and 180 minutes in May 1996. The Trent 700 was the third engine to market on the A330, after GE and PW.

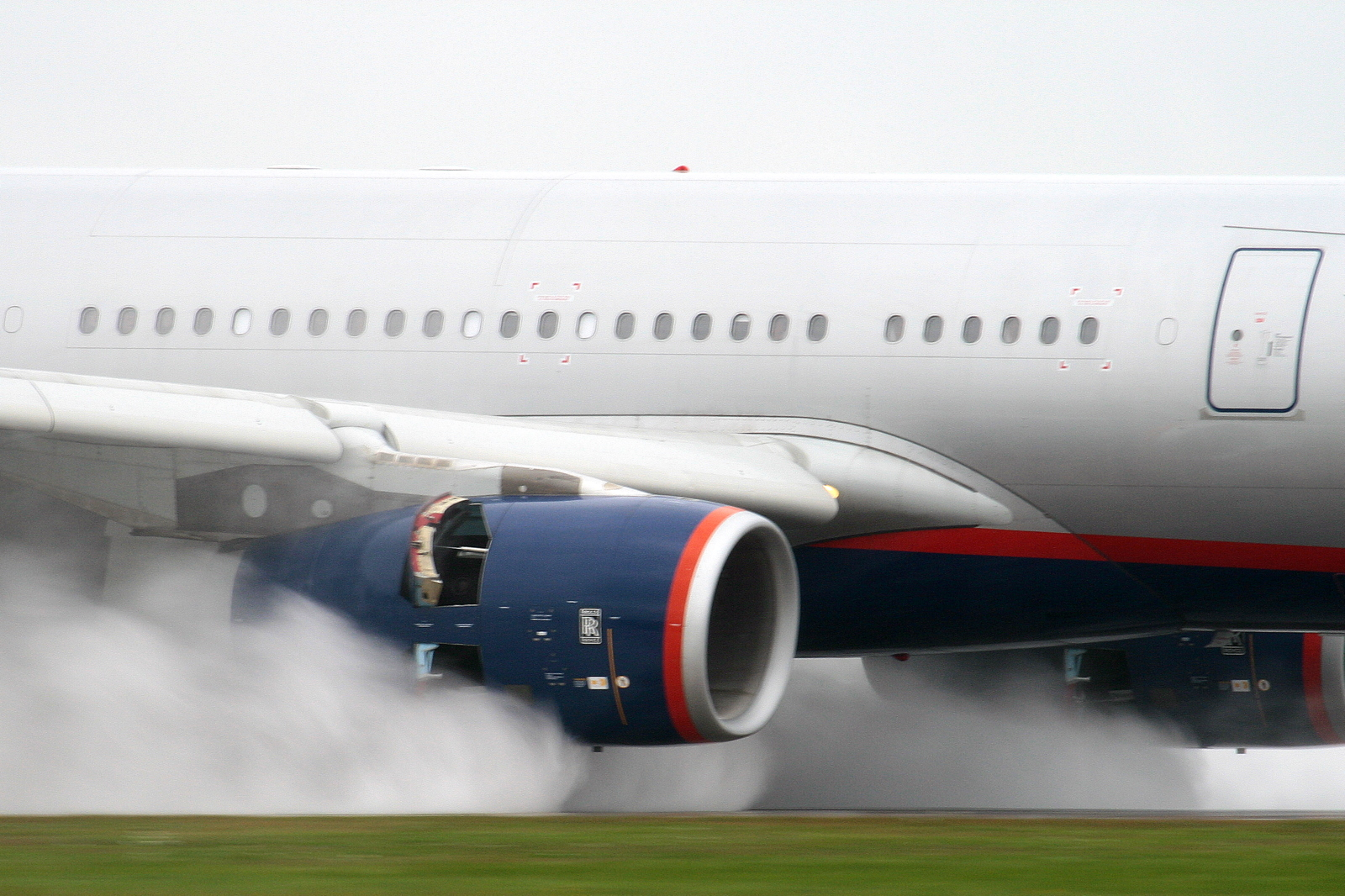
An Aeroflot Trent-powered Airbus A330 deploying its pivoting-door thrust reversers.

== Design ==
The Trent 700 is an axial flow, high bypass turbofan with three coaxial shafts. The fan has 26 Wide Chord Blades and is powered by a 4-stage low pressure turbine. The 8-stage IP compressor and 6-stage HP compressor are both driven by a single stage turbine, and the single annular combustor has 24 Spray Nozzles. The engine is controlled by an EEC.

== Operational history ==
By July 1999, the Trent had secured a nearly 40% share of engine orders for the A330.

In 2009, Rolls-Royce introduced an upgraded version of the engine dubbed the Trent 700EP (enhanced performance) which incorporated a package of improvements derived from later members of the Trent engine family (especially the Trent 1000). These included elliptical leading edges and optimised fan and high-pressure turbine tip clearances. Together the improvements provided a 1.2% improvement to the Trent 700's specific fuel consumption. Some of the improvements were also made available as a retro-fit kit to existing airlines.

Further upgrades were announced in 2013 as part of the T700EP2 package (EIS in late 2016). The upgraded engine was to be available in 2015, intended for higher gross weight A330s. The upgrade package was to improve fuel efficiency by about 1% and was likely to be the last upgrade of Trent 700. It was also potentially to be made available as a retrofit package in the future.

Rolls-Royce claims that the Trent 700 has the lowest life cycle fuel burn, and is the quietest and cleanest engine available on the A330. Cathay Pacific is the largest operator, with 31 Trent 700-powered A330s. Rolls received orders for 140 of the type during the Paris Air Show in June 2007.

By July 2018, the Trent 700 had flown 50 million hours and Rolls-Royce claimed a 60% market share. By June 2019, an Aeroflot Airbus A330-343's Trent 700 engine which had entered service in 2008 had completed over 50,000 hours without requiring an overhaul – a record for a widebody engine.

== Applications ==
- Airbus A330
- Airbus BelugaXL
- Airbus A330 MRTT

== Variants ==
Trent 768-60
Certified in January 1994, rated at 67,500 lbf (300 kN) for take-off. Used on the Airbus A330-341 variant.
Trent 772-60
Certified in March 1994, rated at 71,100 lbf (316 kN) for take-off. Used on the Airbus A330-342 variant.
Trent 772B-60
Certified in September 1997, rated at 71,100 lbf (316 kN) for take-off, produces additional thrust compared to the 772-60 between 610m (2,000ft) and 2440m (8,000ft). Used on the Airbus A330-243 and Airbus A330-343 variants.
Trent 772C-60
Certified in March 2006, rated at 71,100 lbf (316 kN) for take-off, produces additional thrust compared to the 772B-60 above 2440m (8,000ft). Used on the Airbus A330-243 and Airbus A330-343 variants.

== Specifications (Trent 700) ==
Data from EASA

==== General characteristics ====
- Type: Three shaft high bypass ratio, axial flow, turbofan
- Length: 222.0 in (5.639 m)
- Diameter: 97.4 in (2.47 m) (fan)
- Dry weight: 13,580 lb (6,160 kg)

==== Components ====
- Compressor: Single-stage fan with 26 wide-chord blades, eight-stage IP compressor, six-stage HP compressor
- Combustors: Single annular, 24-off Fuel Spray Nozzles
- Turbine: Single-stage HP turbine, single-stage IP turbine, four-stage LP turbine

==== Performance ====
- Maximum thrust: 67,500–71,100 lbf (300.3–316.3 kN)
- Overall pressure ratio: 36:1
- Bypass ratio: 5.0:1
- Specific fuel consumption: (cruise)
  - Trent 768‐60, 772‐60, 772B‐60, 772B‐60EP: 0.584 lb/(lbf⋅h) (16.5 g/(kN⋅s))
  - Trent 772C‐60: 0.565 lb/(lbf⋅h) (16.0 g/(kN⋅s))
- Thrust-to-weight ratio: 4.97 - 5.24

== See also ==
Related development

- Rolls-Royce Trent 7000 (successor)

Comparable engines

- General Electric CF6
- Pratt & Whitney PW4000

Related lists

- List of aircraft engines
