= Engine Alliance GP7000 =

Turbofan engine manufactured by Engine Alliance

GP7000
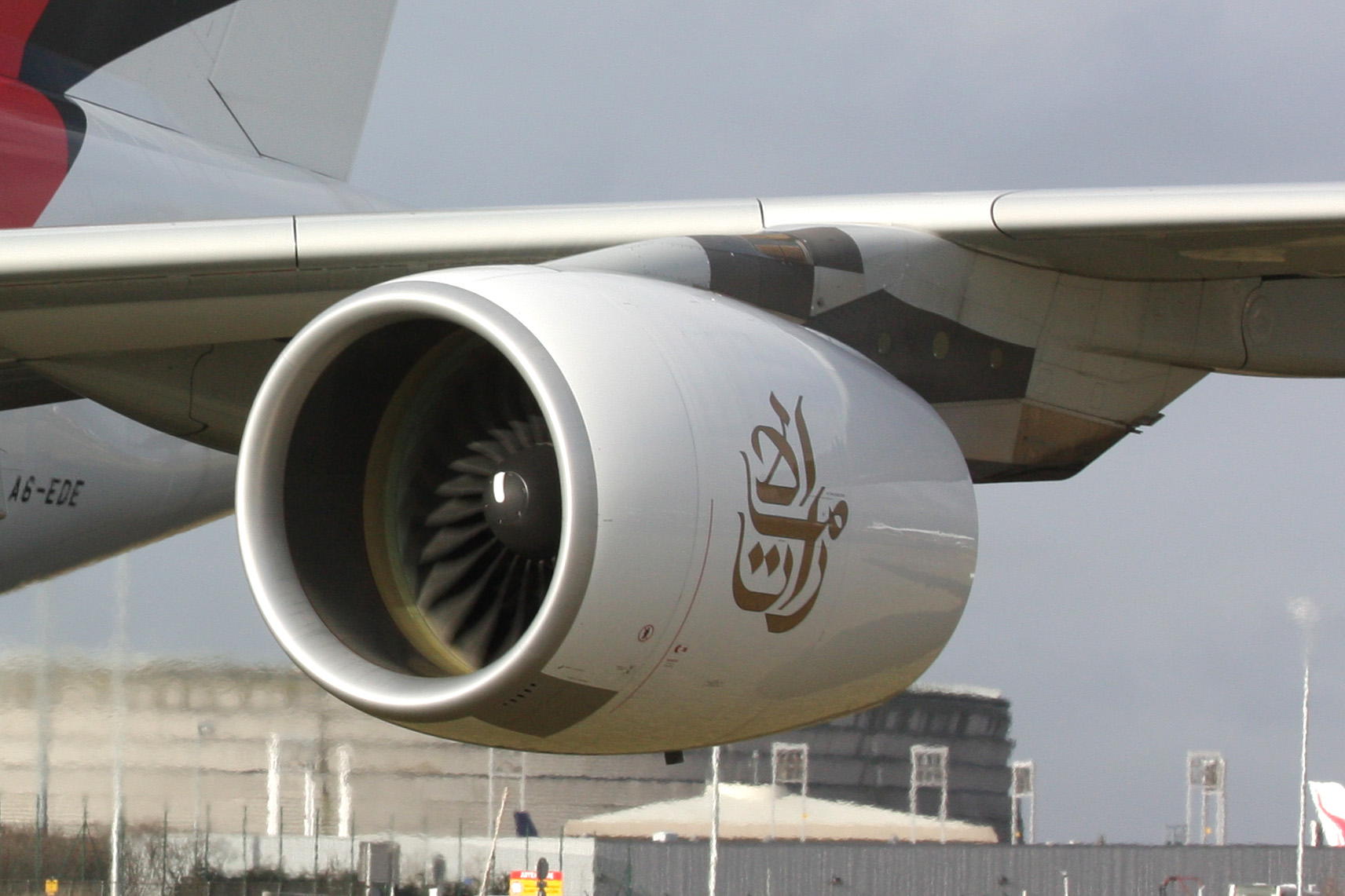
- A GP7270 installed on an Airbus A380, operated by Emirates.
- Type: Turbofan
- National origin: United States
- Manufacturer: Engine Alliance
- First run: April 2004
- Major applications: Airbus A380
- Developed from: General Electric GE90; Pratt & Whitney PW4000

The Engine Alliance GP7000 is a turbofan jet engine manufactured by Engine Alliance, a joint venture between General Electric and Pratt & Whitney. It was one of the powerplant options available for the Airbus A380, along with the Rolls-Royce Trent 900.

== Design and development ==
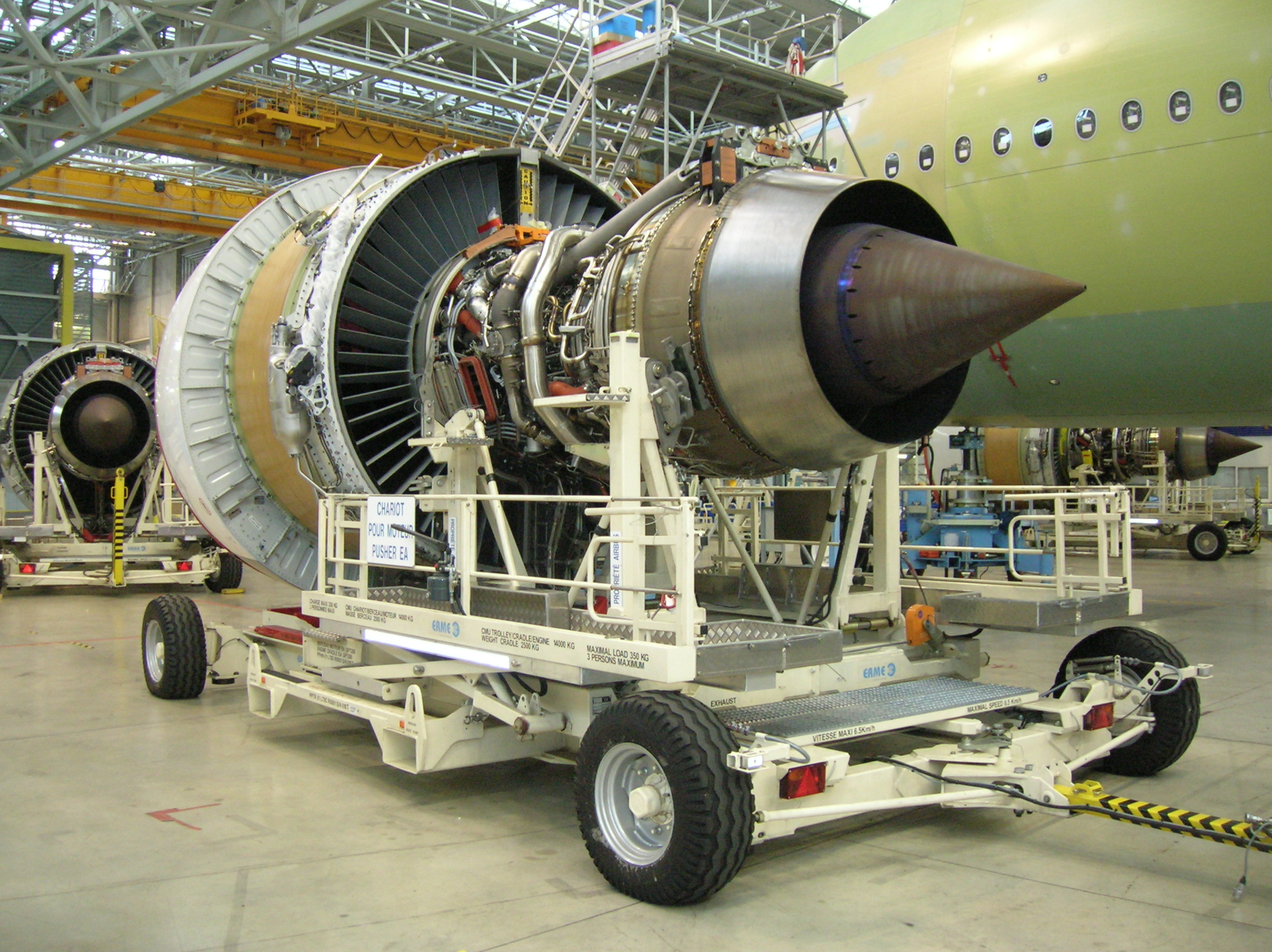
Engine Alliance GP7000 turbofan awaiting installation on an Airbus A380

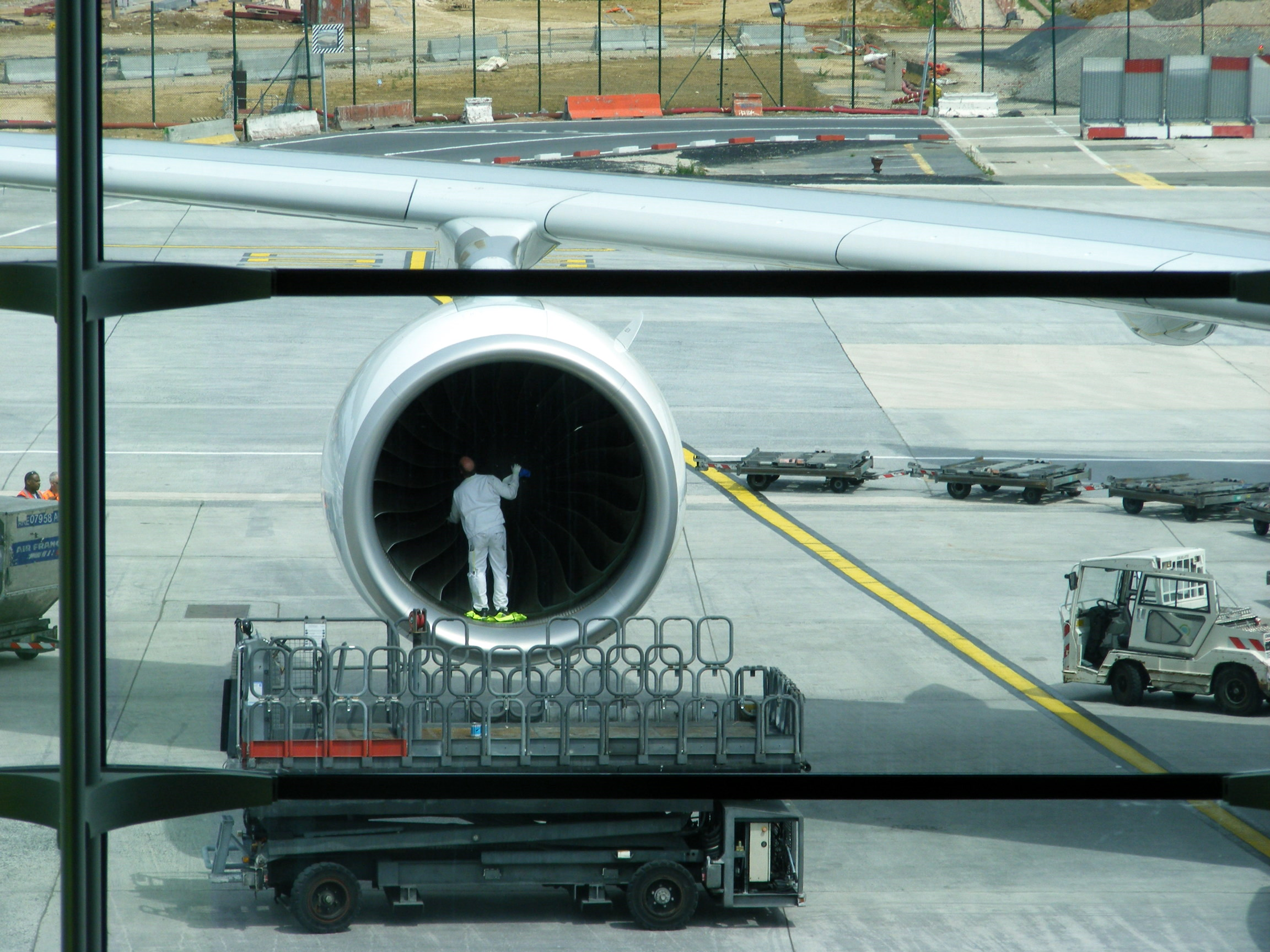
GP7000 inspection

Originally intended to power Boeing Commercial Airplanes' cancelled 747-500X/-600X, the engine has since been pushed for Airbus' A380-800 superjumbo. It is built around an 0.72 scale of the GE90-110B/115B core and contains a Pratt & Whitney fan and low-pressure system design.

The competing Rolls-Royce Trent 900 was named as the lead engine for the then-named A3XX in 1996 and was initially selected by almost all A380 customers. However, the GE/PW engine increased its share of the A380 engine market to the point where, as of September 2007, it will power 47% of the super-jumbo fleet. This disparity in sales was resolved in a single transaction, with Emirates' order of 55 GP7000-powered A380-800s, comprising over one quarter of A380 sales (as of September 2007). Emirates has traditionally been a Rolls-Royce customer. A380 aircraft powered by the GP7000s will have A380-86X model numbers as 6 is the code for Engine Alliance engines. The engine powers an estimated 60% of Airbus A380 in service as reported in 2017.

Ground testing of the engine began in April 2004 and was first flight tested as the number two engine on GE's 747 flying testbed over Victorville, CA in December 2004. The American Federal Aviation Administration certified the engine for commercial operation on January 4, 2006. The engine was ground run for the first time on an A380 on August 14, 2006, in Toulouse. On August 25, 2006, the same aircraft, A380-861 test aircraft (MSN 009), made the first flight of an Engine Alliance powered A380. The flight began and ended at Toulouse and lasted about four hours. Tests were performed on the engines' flight envelope, cruise speed, and handling. A day earlier, the same aircraft performed rejected takeoff tests on the engines.

The Engine Alliance offered the GP7200 for the Airbus A380 passenger and freighter configurations. The GP7270 is rated at 74,735 lbf (332.44 kN) of thrust whilst the GP7277 is rated at 80,290 lbf (357.1 kN). The engine is offered with two ratings appropriate for the various A380 configurations and take-off weights: GP7270 for the 560-tonne variant, and GP7277 for the 590 tonne A380-800 freighter (which was subsequently cancelled by Airbus). In mid-2011 an upgrade was announced which will lead to a cut in weight for each engine by 23 kg (51 lb). The new components come from Volvo Aero.

MTU Aero Engines is a major partner of the programme, with 22.5% share. The German company produces the high-pressure turbine, the low-pressure turbine and the turbine center frame. Safran with 17.5% designs and produces the low-pressure compressor. MDS Aero Support Corporation, a Canadian company, is working hand in hand with MTU to develop next-generation test beds.

MDS in joint cooperation is building the facility to test the next version of this engine in France.

== Variants ==
- GP7270 with 332.44 kN (74,740 lb_{f}) of thrust. In use by A380-861 of Air France, Etihad Airways, Korean Air, and Qatar Airways, as well as 90 of the 123 A380s ordered by Emirates.
- GP7277 with 357.1 kN (80,300 lb_{f}) of thrust. Originally for use on the now-cancelled A380F freighter.

== Applications ==
- Airbus A380

== Notable incidents ==
On 30 September 2017, Air France Flight 66, an Airbus A380 with registration F-HPJE, suffered an uncontained engine failure during flight where the entire fan module (blades and disc) and nose cowl on its number-four GP7270 engine separated from the engine. The aircraft was flying from Paris Charles de Gaulle Airport to Los Angeles International Airport. The aircraft was safely diverted to CFB Goose Bay, Canada. To repatriate the stranded jet, the damaged engine would be replaced and sent back to GE's workshop at Cardiff; a replacement engine had to be placed in the same position to balance the weight for takeoff but not operable. The French accident investigation agency BEA, which is conducting the investigation into the incident, released photos of the first engine fan, fan hub and cowling parts being recovered in Greenland.

The BEA released its final report in September 2020, indicating that the engine failed from a crack in the Ti-6-4 alloy fan hub caused by cold dwell fatigue cracking.

== Specifications (GP7270) ==
==== General characteristics ====
- Type: two-spool high-bypass turbofan engine
- Length: 4.92 m (16.1 ft; 194 in) spinner to flange
- Diameter: 3.16 m (10.4 ft; 124 in), fan 2.96 m (9.7 ft; 117 in)
- Dry weight: 6,712 kg (14,797 lb)

==== Components ====
- Compressor: 24 swept wide-chord hollow titanium fan blades, 8.8:1 by-pass ratio; five-stage low-pressure axial compressor; nine-stage high-pressure axial compressor
- Combustors: low-emissions single annular combustor
- Turbine: two-stage high pressure turbine, boltless architecture, single crystal blades, split blade cooling and thermal barrier coatings, axial flow; six-stage low-pressure axial flow

==== Performance ====
- Maximum thrust: 36,980 kgf, 363 kN, 81,500 lbf
- Overall pressure ratio: 43.9
- Air mass flow: 900 to 1,200 kg/s (2,000 to 2,600 lb/s)
- Thrust-to-weight ratio: 5.197 (assuming 13,400 lbf weight of engine and 70,000 lbf of thrust)

== See also ==
Related development

- General Electric GE90 – High-bypass turbofan aircraft engine
- Pratt & Whitney PW4000 – High-bypass turbofan aircraft engine

Comparable engines

- Rolls-Royce Trent 900 – 2000s British turbofan aircraft engine

Related lists

- List of aircraft engines
