= Rolls-Royce Trent 1000 =

British turbofan engine, developed from earlier Trent series engines

Trent 1000
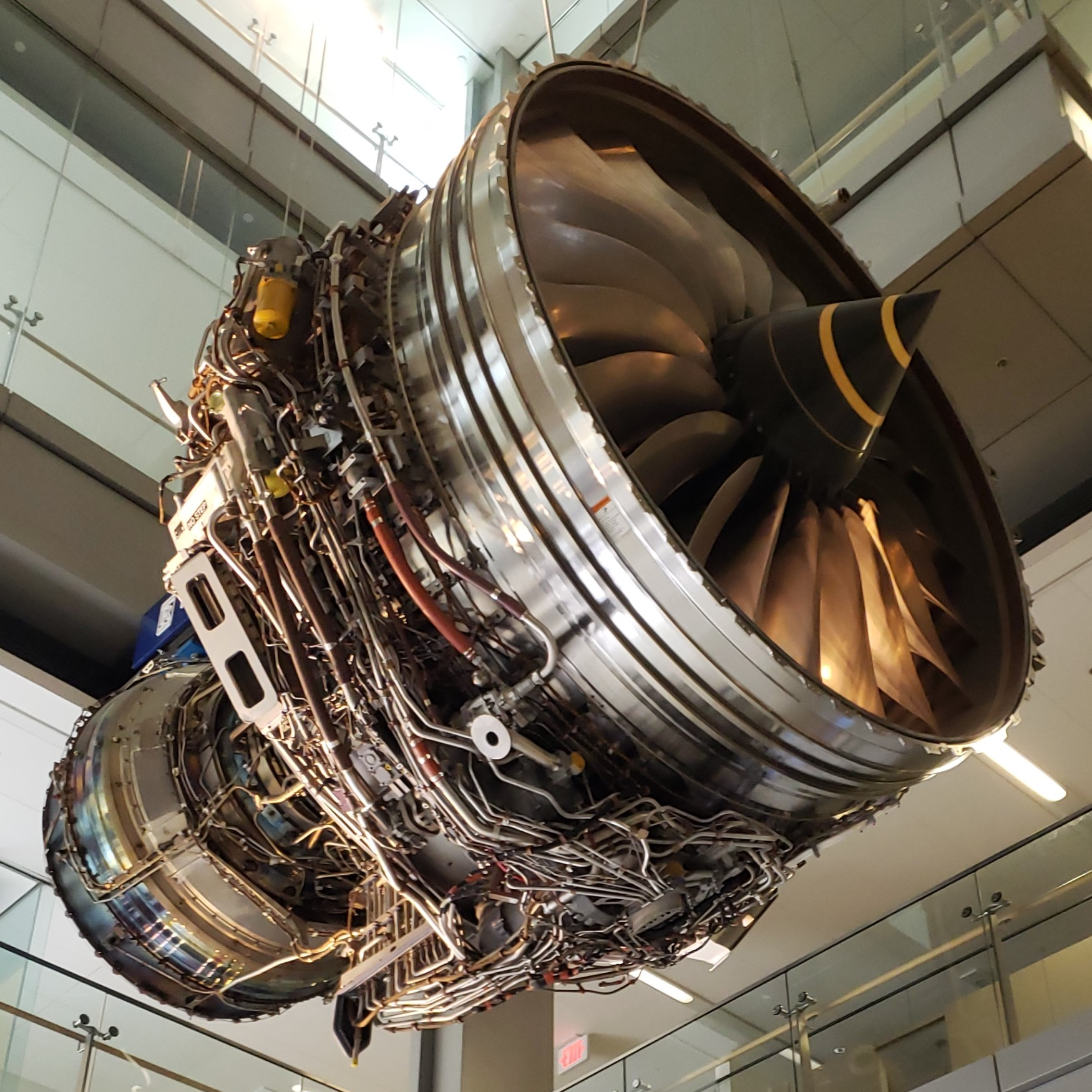
- Rolls-Royce Trent 1000 displayed inside of Goodwin Hall at Virginia Tech
- Type: Turbofan
- National origin: United Kingdom
- Manufacturer: Rolls-Royce
- First run: 14 February 2006
- Major applications: Boeing 787 Dreamliner
- Developed from: Rolls-Royce Trent 900
- Developed into: Rolls-Royce Trent XWB; Rolls-Royce Trent 7000

The Rolls-Royce Trent 1000 is a high-bypass turbofan engine produced by Rolls-Royce, one of the two engine options for the Boeing 787 Dreamliner, competing with the General Electric GEnx. It first ran on 14 February 2006 and first flew on 18 June 2007 before a joint EASA/FAA certification on 7 August 2007 and entered service on 26 October 2011. Corrosion-related fatigue cracking of intermediate pressure (IP) turbine blades was discovered in early 2016, grounding as many as 44 aircraft, and costing Rolls-Royce at least £1.3 billion.

The 62,264–81,028 lbf (276.96–360.43 kN) engine has a bypass ratio over 10:1, a 2.85 m (9 ft 4 in) fan and keeps the characteristic three-spool layout of the Trent series.

The updated Trent 1000 TEN with technology from the Rolls-Royce Trent XWB and the Advance3 aims for up to 3% better fuel burn. It first ran in mid-2014, was EASA certified in July 2016, first flew on a 787 on 7 December 2016 and was introduced on 23 November 2017.

By early 2018 it had a 38% market share of the decided order book. The Rolls-Royce Trent 7000 is a version with bleed air used for the Airbus A330neo.

== Development ==
In 2003, Rolls-Royce was offering a scaled derivative of the Trent 900 for the proposed Boeing 7E7, which could incorporate ANTLE technologies. On 6 April 2004 Boeing announced that it had selected two engine partners for its new 787: Rolls-Royce and General Electric (GE). In June 2004, Air New Zealand chose the Trent 1000 for its two firm orders. On 13 October 2004, All Nippon Airways selected Rolls-Royce to power 30 787-3s and 20 787-8s, a $1 billion (£560 million) deal.

The first run of the Trent 1000 was on 14 February 2006. On 18 June 2007, it made its first flight from TSTC Waco Airport in Texas, on Rolls-Royce's flying testbed, a modified Boeing 747-200. On 7 July 2007, aircraft lessor International Lease Finance Corporation placed an order worth $1.3 billion at list prices for Trent 1000s to power 40 of the 787s which it has on order, $16.25 m per engine. The engine received joint certification from the FAA and EASA on 7 August 2007, or 7/8/7 in Europe. The Trent 1000 is the launch engine on both initial 787 variants, the -8 with ANA and the -9 with Air New Zealand. On 27 September 2007, British Airways announced the selection of the Trent 1000 to power 24 Boeing 787.

On 2 August 2010, a Trent 1000 suffered an uncontained engine failure of the intermediate turbine on a test stand. It was reported as being due to a fire in the engine oil system.

=== Trent 1000-3 (TEN) ===
Rolls-Royce designed an improved version targeting at least 2% better fuel burn than the current Trent 1000 Package C. The company claims to offer up to 3% lower fuel burn than the competition. By May 2015, Rolls claims it helps reduce the General Electric GEnx dominance of the Boeing 787 engine market, with 42% of newly declared engine orders going to the Trent. In early 2018, of 1277 orders, 681 selected GE (53.3%), 420 Rolls-Royce (32.9%) and 176 were undecided (13.8%).

It features a scaled version of the Airbus A350's Rolls-Royce Trent XWB-84 compressor, and Advance3 core technology. Fuel burn is reduced through its improved intermediate pressure compressor where the rear stages spin at higher speeds. Three blisk stages were introduced in the new compressor and 75% of its parts are new or changed from the Package B and C Trent 1000.

The engine first ran in mid-2014. Rolls-Royce initially hoped to certify the Trent TEN before the end of 2015, and to enter service in late 2016. Revising a weight-saving feature called 'banded stators' and other design issues delayed FAA Part 33 engine certification. It was certified by the EASA in July 2016.

It first flew on a Boeing 787 on 7 December 2016. Rolls-Royce will provide the TEN as its engine option for the 787 from 2017.

Meeting smoke-emissions limits at landing and takeoff mode points but not at certain thrusts, in August 2017 Rolls-Royce asked the FAA for a temporary exemption through 2019 to develop a modification. Smoke-emissions limits are met per EASA standards but not at all thrusts as required by FAA. European LCC Norwegian Air, Singaporean carrier Scoot and Air New Zealand took delivery of Trent 1000 TEN-powered 787s in November 2017, with the first commercial service on the 23rd.

All the Trent 1000 TEN engines will be converted to Trent 1000 XE engines by the end of 2027 through a swap of the high-pressure (HP) module.

=== Trent 1000-3 (XE) ===
Rolls-Royce announced a durability enhancement package for the Trent 1000 TEN in October 2025, engines with this modification are named the Trent 1000 XE. 'X' refers to the previous engine generation, TEN, while 'E' stands for enhanced. It features redesigned high-pressure turbine (HPT) blades with 40% better cooling flow. The new turbine blades received EASA clearance in 2024. Other changes include an updated combustion chamber, fuel nozzles, and FADEC software. Lufthansa received its first aircraft with the new engines, a Boeing 787-9, in early November 2025.

Upgrades for the XE series, include a Trent XWB-84 derived combustor-turbine interface, improved combustor tile coatings, lower HPT blade weight, and improvements in HP nozzle guide vane cooling. Rolls-Royce claimed that the upgrades would improve time-on-wing by "a further 30%". Certification and availability of the Upgrades was aimed for 2026, with the "entire fleet" of Trent 1000 TEN powered aircraft to be fully converted to the XE by late 2027 at three Rolls-Royce MRO facilities in UK, Germany and Singapore.

== Design ==
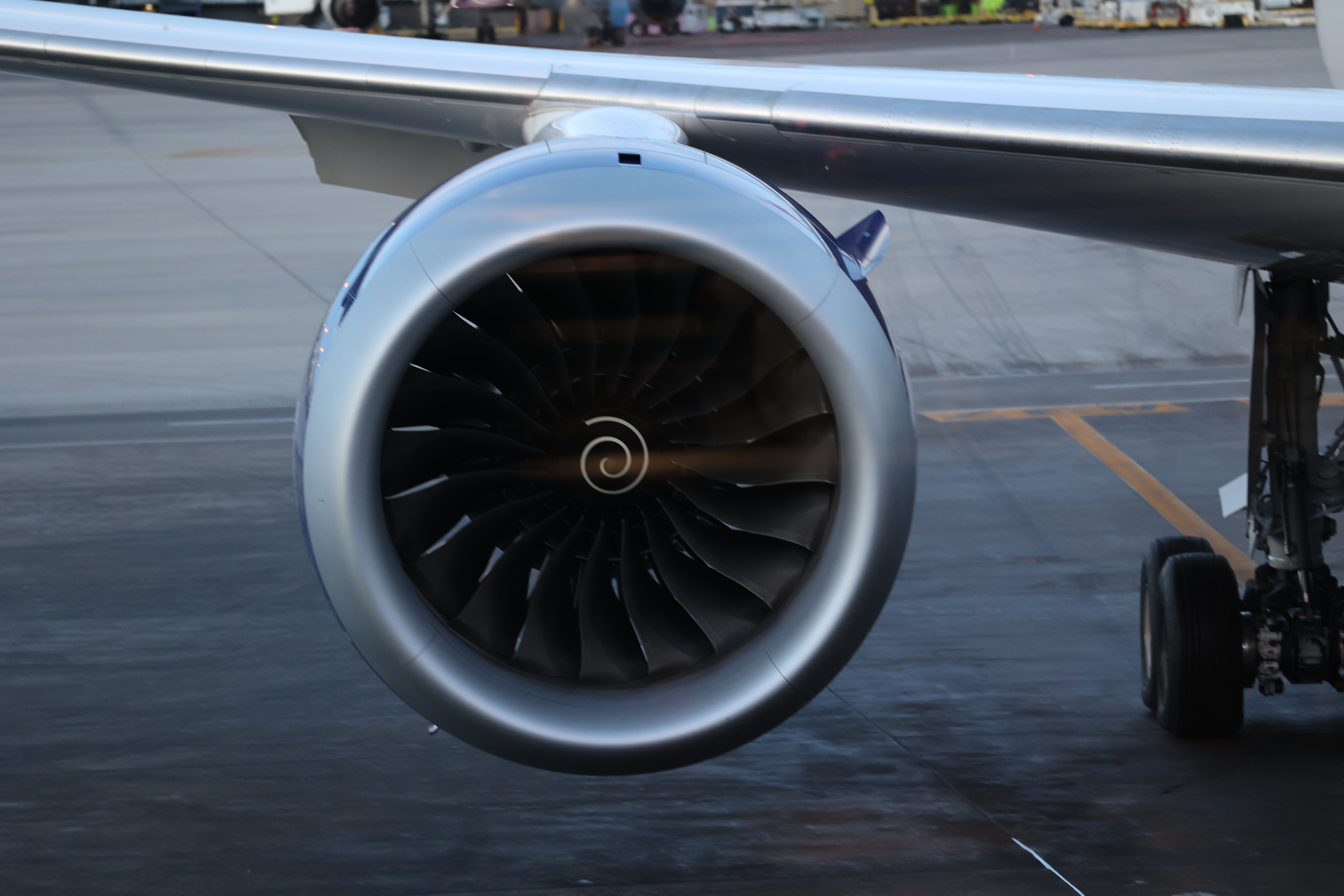
Trent 1000 Engine on British Airways Boeing 787-10

The Trent 1000 is a high bypass turbofan with three independent, coaxial shafts and a single annular combustor with 18 spray nozzles. The Low Pressure shaft with a swept-bladed, 2.85 m (9 ft 4 in) fan is powered by six axial turbines. The Intermediate Pressure spool with 8 axial compressors is turned by a single turbine stage. The six-stage High Pressure Compressor is driven by a single turbine stage, turning in the opposite direction of the two others shafts. The engine is controlled by an EEC.

Initially, Boeing toyed with the idea of sole sourcing the powerplant for the 787, with GE Aviation being the most likely candidate. However, potential customers demanded choices and Boeing relented.

For the first time in commercial aviation, both engine types will have a standard interface with the aircraft, allowing any 787 to be fitted with either a GE or Rolls-Royce engine at any time as long as the pylon is also modified. Engine interchangeability makes the 787 a more flexible asset to airlines, allowing them to change from one manufacturer's engine to the other's in light of any future engine developments which conform more closely to their operating profile. The cost of such a change would require a significant operating cost difference between the two engine types to make it economical – a difference that does not exist with the engines today.

As with earlier variants of the Trent family, Rolls partnered with risk and revenue sharing partners on the Trent 1000 program. This time there were six partners: Kawasaki Heavy Industries (intermediate compressor module), Mitsubishi Heavy Industries (combustor and low pressure turbine blades), Industria de Turbo Propulsores (low pressure turbine), Carlton Forge Works (fan case), Hamilton Sundstrand (gearbox) and Goodrich Corporation (engine control system). Altogether, these partners have a 35 percent stake in the programme.

The Trent 1000 family makes extensive use of technology derived from the Rolls-Royce Trent 8104 demonstrator. In order to fulfill Boeing's requirement for a "more-electric" engine, the Trent 1000 is a bleedless design, with power take-off from the intermediate-pressure (IP) spool instead of the high-pressure (HP) spool found in other members of the Trent family. A 2.8 m (110 in) diameter swept-back fan, with a smaller diameter hub to help maximize airflow, was specified. The bypass ratio has been increased over previous variants by suitable adjustments to the core flow.

A high pressure ratio along with contra-rotating the IP and HP spools improves efficiency. The use of more legacy components reduces the parts count to minimise maintenance costs. A tiled combustor is featured.

== Operational history ==
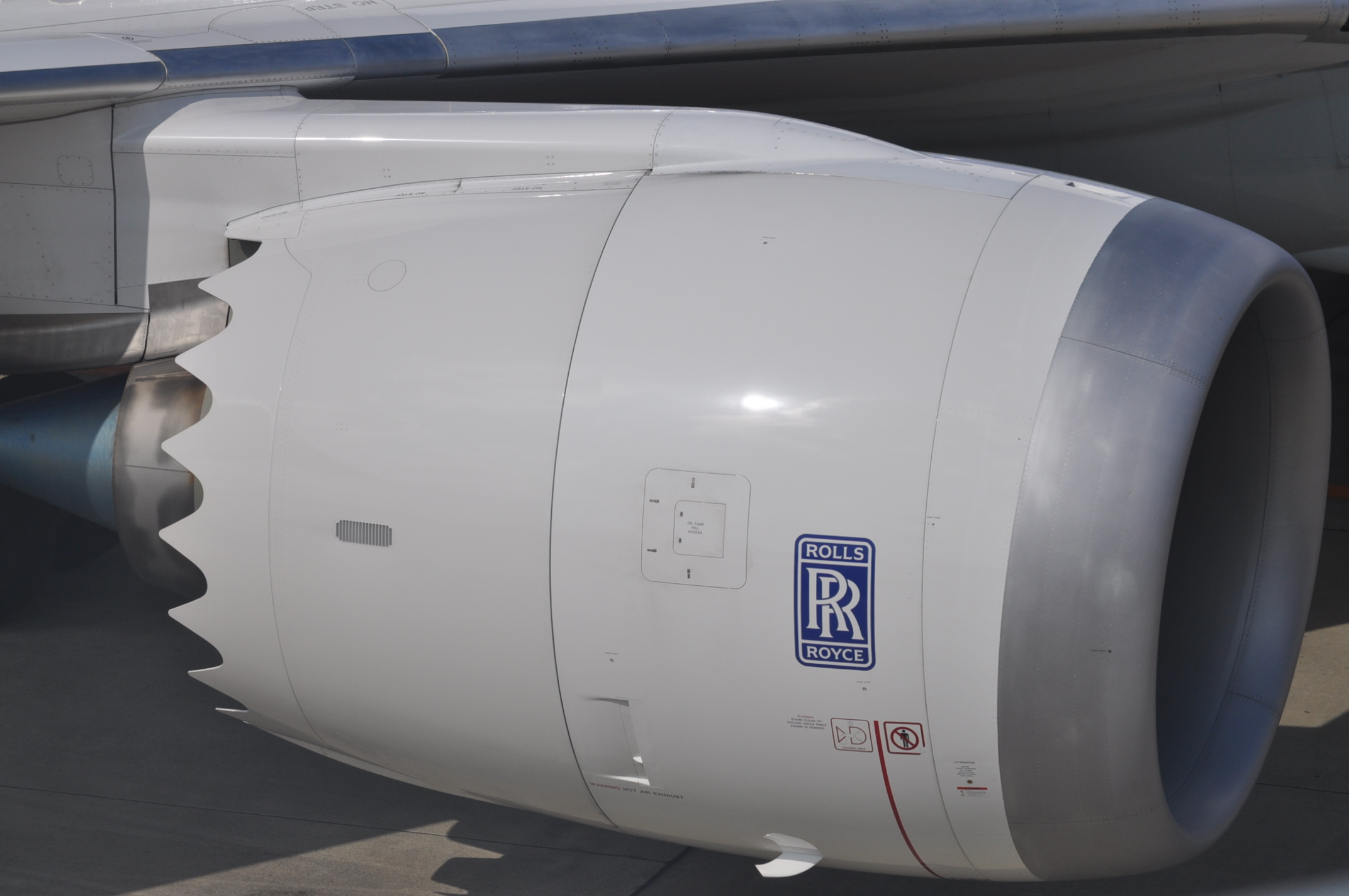
The Trent 1000 nacelle on an ANA 787.

On 26 October 2011, the 787 flew its first commercial flight from Tokyo Narita Airport to Hong Kong International Airport on All Nippon Airways. It was powered by Trent 1000 engines.

The 787 was introduced in September 2011 with Package A with 1% worse thrust specific fuel consumption (TSFC) than the initial Boeing specification, which was matched by Package B certified in December 2011, then improved by Package C offering 1% better fuel burn than specified and EASA certified in September 2013. From early operations, GE claimed a 2% fuel burn advantage and 1% better performance retention.

In March 2014, of the 787 firm orderbook, Rolls-Royce had 321 (31%), GE 564 (55%) and 146 were undecided (14%). The performance improvement packages rectified fuel burn and reliability issues, but problems in the active fleet persist and durability problems with certain components remain for 400 to 500 engines in 2017. In early 2018, of 1277 orders, 681 selected the GEnx (53%), 420 the Trent 1000 (33%) and 176 were undecided (14%).

=== Blade cracking ===
Corrosion-related fatigue cracking of intermediate-pressure turbine (IPT) blades was discovered at All Nippon Airways in early 2016. Engines showing excessive corrosion were pulled from service and repaired in a shop visit, more corrosion-resistant blades were developed and rolled-out. HPT blades fatigue was checked and IPC rotor seals inspected but several airlines had to ground 787s. Rolls-Royce had to spend $35 million on unexpected "technical provisions" for its in-service Trent 1000 fleet in 2017.

In April 2018, the inspection interval for 380 Package C Trent 1000s was reduced from every 200 flights to every 80 to address durability problems, as the EASA should be followed by the US FAA, reducing ETOPS from 330 to 140 minutes and impacting trans-Pacific flights. On 17 April the US FAA confirmed this ETOPS reduction. On 19 April, the EASA issued an Airworthiness Directive stating "occurrences were reported on RR Trent 1000 'Pack C' engines, where some IPC Rotor 1 and Rotor 2 blades were found cracked. This condition, if not detected and corrected, could lead to in-flight blade release, possibly resulting in reduced control of the aeroplane." EASA inspection rates are increased but ETOPS are maintained.

On 26 April 2018, the FAA limited ETOPS for package C engines. This affected Air Europa, Air New Zealand, Avianca, British Airways, Ethiopian, LATAM, LOT Polish, Norwegian Air, Royal Brunei, Scoot, Thai Airways and Virgin Atlantic.

Boeing dispatched 737 MAX head VP Keith Leverkuhn to help Rolls-Royce overcome the problems, showing their importance as 34 aircraft are grounded and this number could rise in coming months as the 383 affected engines power a quarter of the 787 fleet. The Boeing 787 production rise to 14 monthly by mid-2019 should not be affected as 70% have GE Aircraft Engines, but seven new airliners are assembled awaiting engines.

As FAA and EASA airworthiness directives mandated inspections by 9 June, grounded airliners should rise to a peak of 50: after 80% of the engines were checked, 29% of them failed inspection and remain grounded. Rolls-Royce assigned 200 people to solve the issue and installs a revised IP compressor blade for early June testing, accelerating a permanent fix development to have parts available for overhaul from late 2018. To cover these problems, Rolls budgets £340 million ($450 million) in 2018 and less in 2019, compared to an around £450 million ($643 million) 2018 free cash flow. In early June, a redesigned blade was flight tested on Rolls-Royce's 747-200 as 35 were grounded, and easing ETOPS restrictions would need convincing regulatory agencies that disrupting a single-engine diversion is improbable enough.

A similar IP Compressor durability issue was identified on some Package B engines, the 166 Package B engines will be inspected on-wing as an EASA AD will be published in June 2018. A precautionary redesign of the Package B part was started, as for the Trent 1000 TEN, while its young fleet did not show reduced IPC durability. The Package B in service fleet is currently at 61 while eight are in storage. A compressor blade stocks shortfall led to up to three days longer than planned fixes as grounded jets reach 43, while Rolls dedicated almost £1 billion ($1.3 billion) to address the issues.

Aircraft-on-ground peaked at 44 before falling, less than the 50 expected, and turbine blade capacity, a limiting factor, increased by 50% since 2018 started. The problems should not spread to the Rolls-Royce Trent XWB, as there is no evidence of similar issues and it was developed with more modern tools and a different design flow – while not enough engines were visited yet to rule it out, or to the Rolls-Royce Trent 7000 which will include Trent 1000 improvements. A £554 million ($725 million) exceptional expense was taken for 2018, 40% of the total cash cost to 2022, before £450 million in 2019 and £100 million less in 2020.

==== Mitigation ====
Exposing the base material to low-cycle fatigue, the thermal barrier coating on the IP turbine blades was eroded prematurely by "hot corrosion" caused by high atmospheric sulfur due to polluting industries around large Asia-Pacific cities. The initial fix, a revised base material and coating to counter IP turbine corrosion, was installed by September 2018 in over 62% of the affected fleet. Laboratory testing of the newer turbine is satisfactory and the turbine lifetime should be proved by in-service inspections, with some engines already having completed 1,000–1,500 cycles. A materials test programme was verified with UK and European universities: low-cycle fatigue tests showed the agent diffusion into the main material was prevented, avoiding microcrack formation. A model predicts the corrosive agents exposure to avoid inspections and to sequence the retrofits.

The failure mechanism was not clearly understood when the issue was discovered in March, after four compressor blades on the first IP rotor and one on the second failed in a high-time engine. Vibration surveys revealed a fan wake affecting the compressor blade, with a 100 Hz frequency difference between the IP and LP spools setting up an eigenmode synchronised vibration in the first two compressor rotors. This caused wear and tear leading to microcracks in the blades roots, growing to proper cracks failing after around 1,000 cycles and resulting in an inflight shutdown. To avoid eigenmodes, Rolls shifts the blade mass from the center towards the periphery. Testing showed no damaging vibration and certification should be approved by year-end, the new blade begun production in anticipation. While it has a different Rolls-Royce Trent XWB-style IP rotor design with no eigenmode, the same stages were also redesigned for the Trent 1000 TEN, as well as the Rolls-Royce Trent 7000.

In March 2018, Rolls conservatively limited single engine operating at maximum continuous power to 140 min, leading regulators to restrict ETOPS. Only one engine failed among over 100 showing small cracks, one-third of the suspect population of 366 engines, as crack develops slowly. On the ground at Derby, an instrumented Trent 1000 with cracked rotors ran 10 h at maximum continuous power with no crack propagation, and was then mounted to Rolls' 747 testbed aircraft in mid-September to confirm it is not a high-cycle fatigue problem to ease ETOPS restrictions. Flights should begin at the end of September off the California coast, it will be run at FL120 and maximum power like a single engine ETOPS diversion, to be followed by cold weather tests in Alaska. By December, the number of grounded engines were still high, and was to improve significantly over the first half of 2019. Following EASA and FAA approval from, a redesigned IP compressor blade design was installed on the Package C Trent 1000 from January 2019.

By November 2019, Rolls-Royce aimed for below ten aircraft-on-ground by mid-2020. After a HP turbine design intended for early 2020 was evaluated, a redesigned Trent 1000 TEN HP blade was not as durable as expected and its introduction was delayed until the first half of 2021, the last required modification. Rolls-Royce expects to take a £1.4 billion ($1.8 billion) charge in 2019, nearly doubling from the £790 million absorbed in 2018, as all costs spread across 2017–2023 are increasing to £2.4 billion, up from £1.6 billion estimated by mid-2019.

=== Reliability ===
Up to March 2016, it has a dispatch reliability of 99.9 percent and four in-flight shutdown (IFSD) gave a rate of 2 IFSD per million flight hours.

On 10 August 2019, a Norwegian Long Haul Boeing 787-8 departing Rome had an engine failure, and the crew managed an event-less emergency landing. Parts damaged the plane's left wing, horizontal stabiliser, fuselage and main landing gear tyres, and fell over urban areas. A turbine blade broke and may have caused others to disintegrate.

== Applications ==
- Boeing 787 Dreamliner

== Variants ==
Variants were certified by the EASA

=== Trent 1000-1 (Package A / Package B) ===
Trent 1000‐A, Trent 1000‐C, Trent 1000‐D, Trent 1000‐E, Trent 1000‐G, Trent 1000‐H

==== Trent 1000-1E (Package B Enhanced) ====
Trent 1000‐AE, Trent 1000‐CE

=== Trent 1000-2 (Package C) ===
Trent 1000‐A2, Trent 1000‐AE2, Trent 1000‐C2, Trent 1000‐CE2, Trent 1000‐D2, Trent 1000‐E2, Trent 1000‐G2, Trent 1000‐H2, Trent 1000‐J2, Trent 1000‐K2, Trent 1000‐L2

=== Trent 1000-3 (TEN / XE) ===
Trent 1000‐AE3, Trent 1000‐CE3, Trent 1000‐D3, Trent 1000‐G3, Trent 1000‐H3, Trent 1000‐J3, Trent 1000‐K3, Trent 1000‐L3, Trent 1000‐M3, Trent 1000‐N3, Trent 1000‐P3, Trent 1000‐Q3, Trent 1000‐R3

Trent 1000 variants
Designation	Models	Take-off rating	Continuous
Trent 1000-A/A2/AE/AE2/AE3	787-8/9	69,194 lbf (307.79 kN)	64,722 lbf (287.90 kN)
Trent 1000-C/C2/CE/CE2/CE3	787-8	74,511 lbf (331.44 kN)	69,523 lbf (309.25 kN)
Trent 1000-D/D2/D3	787-8/9	74,511 lbf (331.44 kN)	69,523 lbf (309.25 kN)
Trent 1000-E/E2	787-8	62,264 lbf (276.96 kN)	58,866 lbf (261.85 kN)
Trent 1000-G/G2/G3	787-8	72,066 lbf (320.57 kN)	64,722 lbf (287.90 kN)
Trent 1000-H/H2/H3	787-8	63,897 lbf (284.23 kN)	58,866 lbf (261.85 kN)
Trent 1000-J2/J3	787-9/10	78,129 lbf (347.54 kN)	71,818 lbf (319.46 kN)
Trent 1000-K2/K3	787-9/10	78,129 lbf (347.54 kN)	71,818 lbf (319.46 kN)
Trent 1000-L2/L3	787-8	74,551 lbf (331.62 kN)	69,523 lbf (309.25 kN)
Trent 1000-M3	787	79,728 lbf (354.65 kN)	72,691 lbf (323.35 kN)
Trent 1000-N3	787	79,728 lbf (354.65 kN)	72,691 lbf (323.35 kN)
Trent 1000-P3	787	74,551 lbf (331.62 kN)	69,523 lbf (309.25 kN)
Trent 1000-Q3	787	78,129 lbf (347.54 kN)	71,818 lbf (319.46 kN)
Trent 1000-R3	787	81,028 lbf (360.43 kN)	72,691 lbf (323.35 kN)

== Engines on display ==
A Trent 1000 is on display at the Museum of Making, Derby.

== Specifications ==
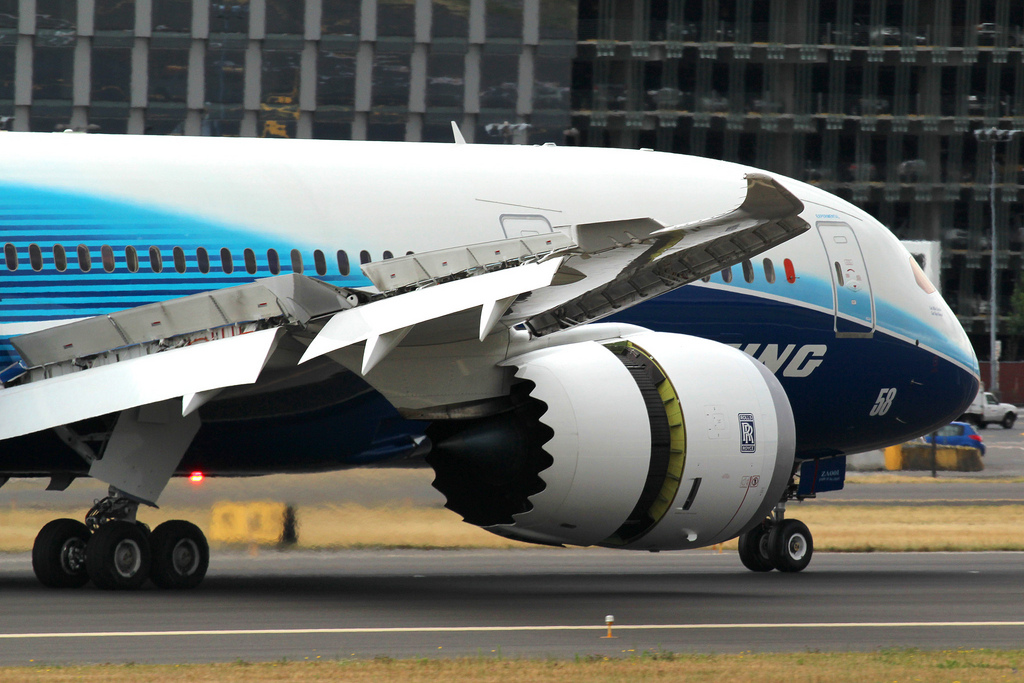
Trent 1000 deploying thrust reverser on a Boeing 787 prototype

Data from EASA

==== General characteristics ====
- Type: Three-shaft high bypass ratio turbofan engine
- Length: 4.738 m (186.5 in)
- Diameter: 2.85 m (112 in) (Fan)
- Dry weight: 5,936–6,120 kg (13,087–13,492 lb)

==== Components ====
- Compressor: one-stage LP (fan), eight-stage IP, six-stage HP compressor
- Combustors: single annular combustor with 18‐off fuel spray nozzles
- Turbine: Single-stage HP turbine (13391 RPM), single-stage IP turbine (8937 RPM), six-stage LP turbine (2683 RPM)

==== Performance ====
- Maximum thrust: 265.3–360.4 kN (59,600–81,000 lbf)
- Overall pressure ratio: 50:1
- Bypass ratio: >10:1
- Air mass flow: 2,400–2,670 lb (1,090–1,210 kg) per second
- Thrust-to-weight ratio: 6.01(Trent 1000‐R)

== See also ==
Comparable engines

- Engine Alliance GP7000
- General Electric GEnx

Related lists

- List of aircraft engines
