= Energy Efficient Engine =

The Energy Efficient Engine was a program funded by NASA in the 1970s to develop technologies suitable for energy efficient turbofans. Its goal was to improve thrust specific fuel consumption by 12% compared to a GE CF6-50C. Both General Electric and Pratt & Whitney produced turbofans for the program. The GE core featured a 23:1 high-pressure (HP) ratio ten-stage HP compressor, later used in the GE90 and GEnx. P&W also used a ten-stage HP compressor in their core, but it developed 14:1 pressure ratio.
