= Rolls-Royce Trent 7000 =

Jet engine

Trent 7000
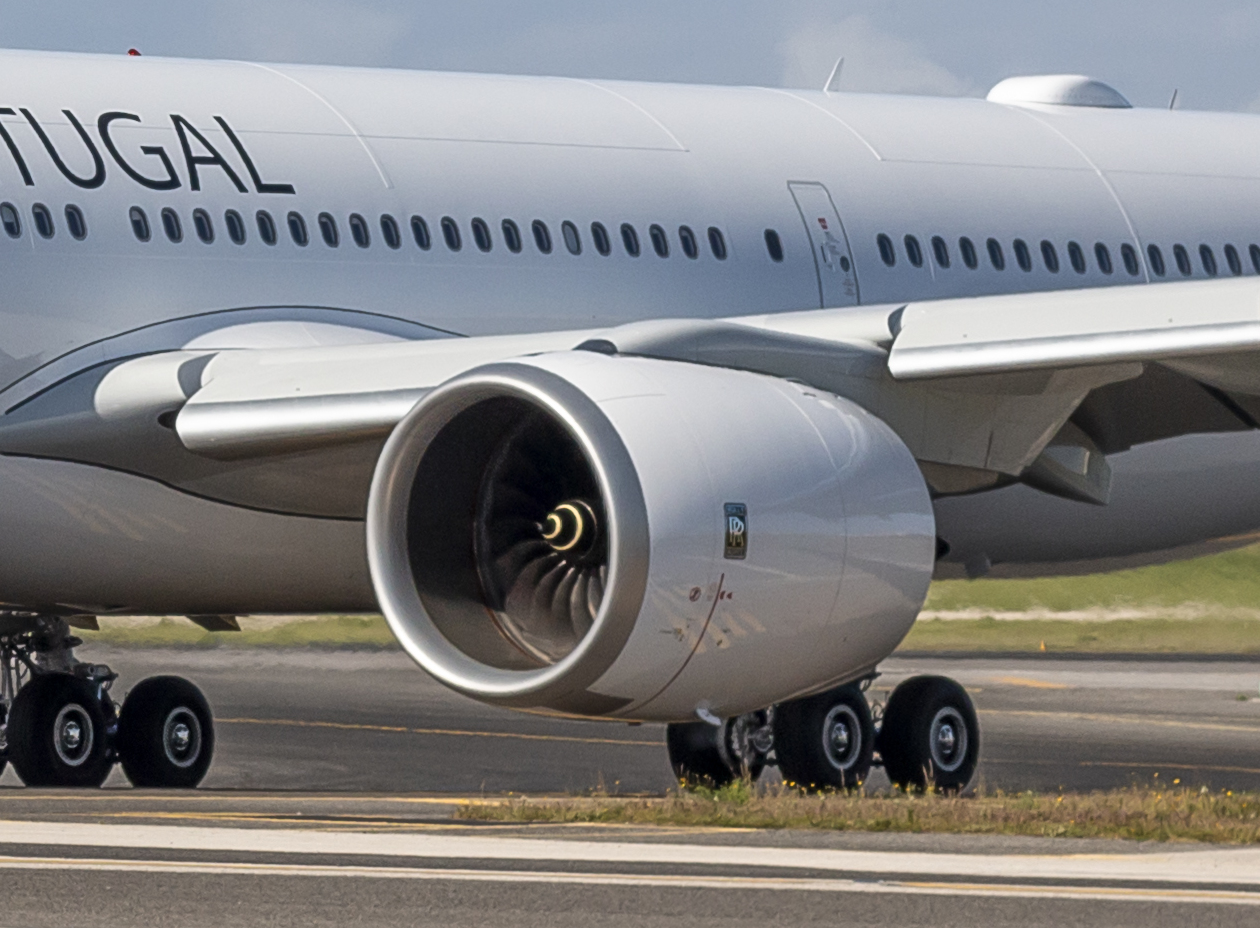
- Rolls-Royce Trent 7000 installed on Airbus A330-900
- Type: Turbofan
- National origin: United Kingdom
- Manufacturer: Rolls-Royce Holdings
- First run: 27 November 2015
- Major applications: Airbus A330neo
- Developed from: Rolls-Royce Trent 1000

The Rolls-Royce Trent 7000 is a high-bypass turbofan engine produced by Rolls-Royce, an iteration of the Trent family exclusively powering the Airbus A330neo. Announced on 14 July 2014, and first run on 27 November 2015. Its maiden flight was on 19 October 2017 on the A330neo. It received its EASA type certification on 20 July 2018 as a Rolls-Royce Trent 1000 variant. It was first delivered on 26 November, and was cleared for ETOPS 330 by 20 December. Compared to the A330's Rolls-Royce Trent 700, the 68,000–72,000 lbf (300–320 kN) engine doubles the bypass ratio to 10:1 and halves emitted noise. Pressure ratio is increased to 50:1, and it has a 112 in (280 cm) fan and a bleed air system. Fuel consumption is improved by 11%.

== Development ==
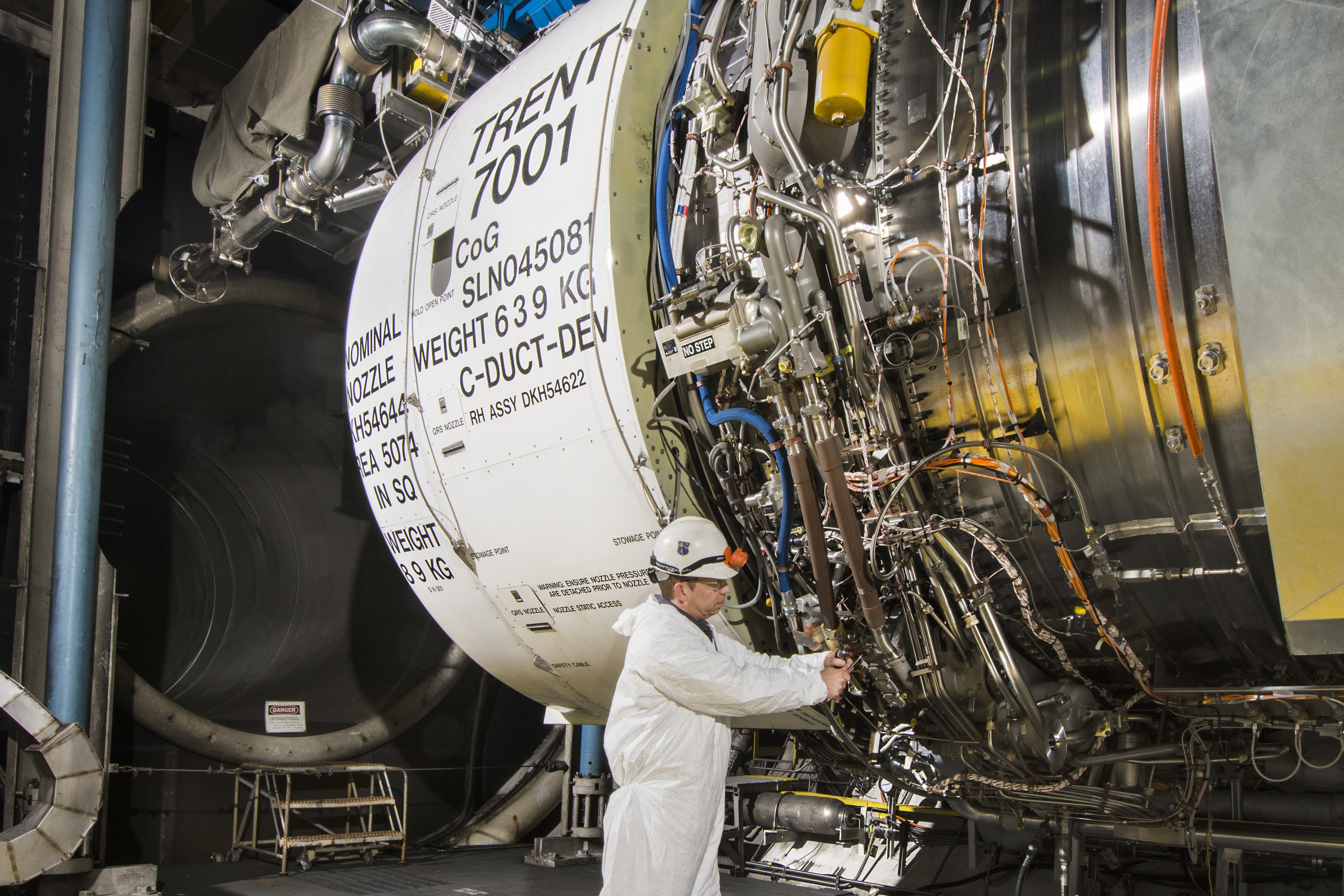
Testing at the Arnold Air Force Base in February 2016

Announced on 14 July 2014 at the Farnborough Airshow, the Trent 7000 is the exclusive engine for the Airbus A330neo, succeeding the Rolls-Royce Trent 700 used for the Airbus A330. It first ran on 27 November 2015 on a test bed in Derby. Although the first two test engines were made in Derby, further test engines and production Trent 7000 is assembled in the Rolls-Royce Singapore facility.

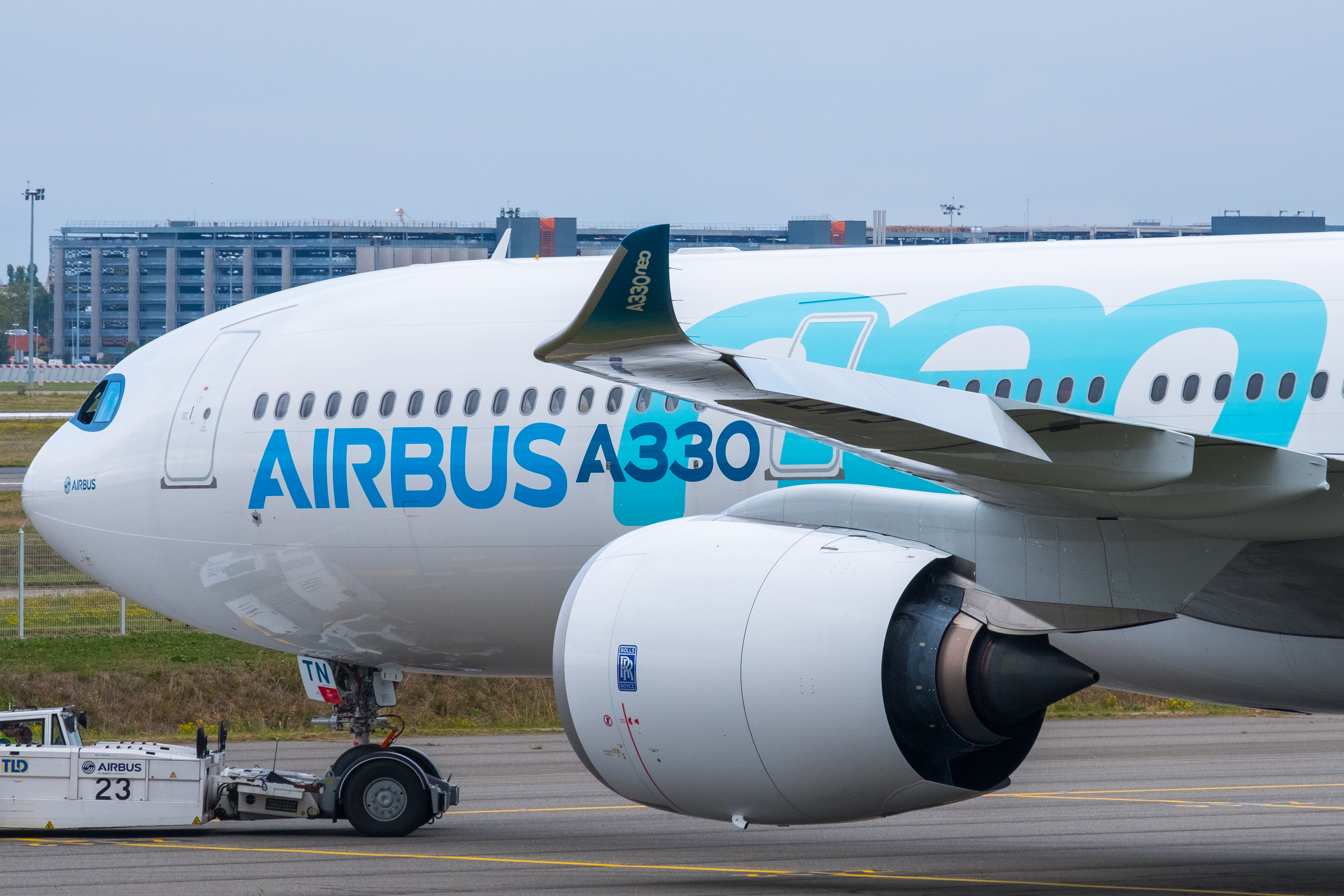
Trent 7000 on an Airbus A330neo

In 2015 Rolls-Royce experienced development problems with the Rolls-Royce Trent 1000 TEN, and had to involve extra resources to support the on-time March 2017 Boeing 787-10 maiden flight; this led to delays in the Trent 7000 programme. The first pair of engines were shipped to Airbus in June 2017, and the type made its first flight on 19 October 2017 aboard its A330neo application. This directly followed a period of ground testing which included altitude, icing, cross-wind, noise and cyclic testing in the USA, and endurance, operability and functional performance testing in the UK.

As it is based on the Trent 1000, it was feared that it could share its durability problems and that could deter buyers. However, Rolls-Royce's CEO Warren East claimed the 7000 was not affected by the Trent 1000 issues.

The Trent 7000 received its EASA type certification on 20 July 2018, and is certified as a Trent 1000 variant. Certification was delayed from the initially planned first quarter of 2017. At the time, ETOPS testing was halfway through as 3,000 engine cycles are planned, to be completed by early August. The engine was then planned to be disassembled, examined and reported by the end of September, for an ETOPS certification in time for the year-end introduction.

By August 2018, quantity production was proving to be challenging and in October Rolls-Royce only expected 500 large engines deliveries in 2018, down from 550. Rolls-Royce confirmed 10 deliveries by the end of October, below the 30 needed for 15 A330neos deliveries by year-end.

The A330-900 was initially cleared for 180 min ETOPS with a limitation of 500 engine cycles for the first delivery to TAP Portugal on 26 November. Full ETOPS required an EASA approval plan with a 3,000 cycles validation test plus three simulated diversions followed by disassembly and examination before the end of December. ETOPS 330 was secured by 20 December.

In 2019, Rolls-Royce delivered 106 Trent 7000s, up from eight in 2018, while it achieved a 99.9% dispatch reliability.

In September 2025, the derated versions of the Trent 7000 were introduced and certified by EASA.

== Design ==
The Trent 7000's architecture comes from the latest version of the Trent 1000, the TEN, using the A330's Trent 700 experience and technology from the Trent XWB. The 68,000–72,000 lbf (300–320 kN) engine doubles the bypass ratio and halves emitted noise compared to the Trent 700. Maximum pressure ratio is increased to 50:1 from 36:1 and it has a bleed air system for environmental control and wing anti-icing.

Compared to the 20-year-older Trent 700 introduced in 1995, the Trent 7000 features a smaller fan hub and a larger fan —112 inches (2.8 m) compared to 97 inches (2.5 m). This doubles the bypass ratio from 5 to 10, giving it the highest bypass ratio of any Trent engine. The fan has 20 blades.

The overall pressure ratio is increased due to Trent XWB core compressor technology, improving thermal efficiency. This is associated with a 200 °C (360 °F) increase in internal temperatures; Thermally-coated high-pressure turbine blades are used instead of the more expensive ceramic matrix composites, which are used in the next Rolls-Royce engine generation, Ultrafan. The larger fan and higher bypass ratio require two more stages in the low-pressure turbine; the engine is heavier. The Trent 700 weighs 6,160 kg (13,580 lb), while the Trent 7000 weighs 6,445 kg (14,209 lb) 285 kg (628 lb) more.

Despite the additional weight and the extra drag resulting from the wider diameter, Rolls-Royce reported fuel consumption would improve by 11%. Since bleed air is used instead of electrical power generation (as in the 787's Trent 1000), the IP accessory drive is less loaded and enables the high-pressure compressor to maintain stability at low power settings, improving low-speed fuel consumption for short-haul operations. The engine features active turbine clearance control providing the optimal level of cooling air for different phases of flight.

At take-off, the fan displaces up to 1.3 t (2,900 lb) of air per second, the jet nozzle velocity is almost 1,000 mph (450 m/s) and each high pressure turbine blade generates around 800 hp (600 kW), rotating at 12,500 rpm with their tips reaching 1,200 mph (540 m/s). Rolls-Royce reports the engine is 10 dB quieter than the Trent 700.

== Variants ==
Data from EASA

Designation	Models	Take-off rating	Continuous	Certification date
Trent 7000-68	A330-800/900	68,555 lbf (304.95 kN)	58,634 lbf (260.82 kN)	25 September 2025
Trent 7000-70	A330-800/900	70,571 lbf (313.92 kN)	61,004 lbf (271.36 kN)	25 September 2025
Trent 7000-72	A330-800/900	72,834 lbf (323.98 kN)	65,005 lbf (289.16 kN)	20 July 2018
Trent 7000-72C	A330-800/900	72,834 lbf (323.98 kN)	65,005 lbf (289.16 kN)	20 July 2018
Trent 7000-72D	A330-800/900	72,834 lbf (323.98 kN)	65,005 lbf (289.16 kN)	25 September 2025

== Specifications ==
Data from EASA for Trent 7000-72

==== General characteristics ====
- Type: Three-shaft turbofan
- Length: 4775 mm / 188 in
- Diameter: 2.85 m (112 in) fan (20 swept fan blades)
- Dry weight: 6,445 kg (14,209 lb)

==== Components ====
- Compressor: axial, 8 stages IP, 6 stages HP
- Combustors: single annular combustor with 18-off fuel spray nozzles
- Turbine: axial, 1 stage HP, 1 stage IP, 6 stages LP

==== Performance ====
- Maximum thrust: 324.0 kN / 72,834 lbf (Take-Off) ; 289.2 kN / 65,005 lbf (Continuous)
- Overall pressure ratio: 50:1
- Bypass ratio: 10:1
- Air mass flow: 1.3 t (2,900 lb) per second (take-off).
- Turbine inlet temperature: > 1,835 K (1,562 °C; 2,843 °F) max Turbine Entry Temperature
- Specific fuel consumption: −10% against current today's Trent 700
- Thrust-to-weight ratio: 5.13
- Rotating speed: (100%) HP 13,391 rpm, IP 8,937 rpm, LP 2,683 rpm

== See also ==
Related development

- Rolls-Royce Trent 1000
- Rolls-Royce Trent XWB

Comparable engines

- General Electric GE9X

Related lists

- List of aircraft engines
