= General Electric GE9X =

High-thrust turbofan jet engine

GE9X
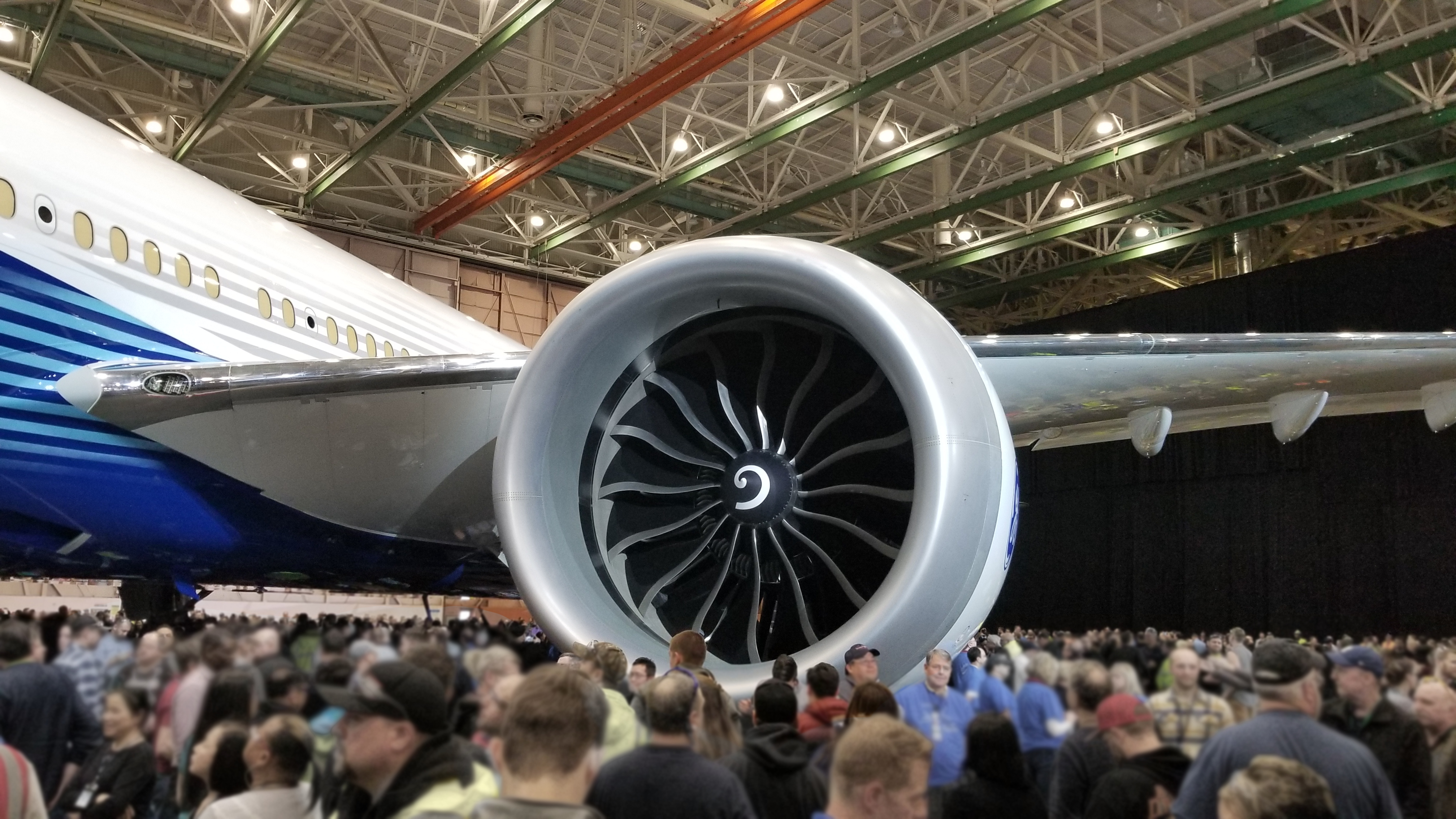
- A GE9X installed on a Boeing 777X during its roll-out in March 2019
- Type: Turbofan
- National origin: United States
- Manufacturer: GE Aerospace
- First run: April 2016
- Major applications: Boeing 777X
- Developed from: General Electric GE90, General Electric GEnx

The General Electric GE9X is a high-bypass turbofan developed by GE Aerospace exclusively for the Boeing 777X. It first ran on the ground in April 2016 and first flew on March 13, 2018; it powered the 777-9's maiden flight in early 2020. It received its Federal Aviation Administration (FAA) type certificate on September 25, 2020. Derived from the General Electric GE90 with a larger fan, advanced materials like ceramic matrix composites (CMCs), and higher bypass and compression ratios, it was designed to improve fuel efficiency by 10% compared to the GE90. It is rated at 110,000 lbf (490 kN) of thrust, which is 5,000 lbf (20 kN) less than the highest thrust variant of the GE90, the -115B.

== Development ==
In February 2012, GE announced studies on a more efficient derivative of the GE90, calling it the GE9X, to power both the -8 and -9 variants of the new Boeing 777X. It was to feature the same 128 in (325 cm) fan diameter as the GE90-115B with thrust decreased by 15,800 lbf (70 kN) to a new rating of 99,500 lbf (443 kN) per engine. The engine for the 777-8X was to be derated to 88,000 lbf (390 kN). The engine was also originally designed with sawtooth nacelles like the 787, 737 MAX and 747-8, but the sawtooth nacelle was later scrapped after a study found a 0.5% fuel penalty with sawtooth nacelles in 2023.

In 2013, the fan diameter was increased by 3.5 in (9 cm) to 132 in (335 cm). In 2014, the fan diameter was increased another 1.5 in (4 cm) to 133.5 in (339 cm), slightly increasing thrust from 102,000 to 105,000 lbf (450 to 470 kN).

The first engine was expected to be ground-tested in 2016, with flight testing to begin in 2017 and certification happening in 2018. Because of the delays, the first flight test occurred in March 2018, with certification expected in late 2019.

=== Ground testing ===
The first engine to test (FETT) completed its first run in April 2016. This engine completed 375 cycles in 335 hours run-time, which validated the engine design in terms of aerodynamic performance, mechanical system behavior and secondary air system heat management.

The GE9X conducted icing tests in Winter 2017. The FETT was used for ground cold weather testing in natural icing conditions such as ground fog; minor design changes using additive manufacturing were made within one month. Icing certification and evaluation finished during the 2017–2018 winter at Winnipeg, Manitoba.

Simulated high-altitude conditions were used to test the GE9X for ice crystal icing (core icing) which was an issue for the GEnx. This testing improved the understanding of core icing as well as the more familiar rime ice. A design change required for the GEnx was the addition of bypass doors between the booster and high-pressure compressor which open into the airflow path to reduce the chance of ice crystals entering the core.

Design changes between FETT and second engine to test (SETT) addressed improvements required to meet efficiency goals: the minimum area in the duct between the high pressure (HP) turbine outlet and the low pressure (LP) turbine inlet was altered to set the operating line of the compressor, turbine and fan. The tip clearance at the front of the HP compressor was modified as a result of early running experience. SETT testing started on May 16, 2017, at Peebles, Ohio, 13 months after FETT; it was the first engine built to the finalized production standard for certification. During the FAA 150 hr block test, the variable stator vane (VSV) lever arm failed and its redesign led to a 3–month delay. SETT was followed by four more test engines by May 2018.

The certification program began in May 2017. Eight additional engines were involved for certification, as well as one for ETOPS certification installed in the aircraft nacelle. A core engine was tested in the Evendale, Ohio, altitude test cell to check blade vibrations and engines 003, 004, and 007 were assembled in 2017, and the fourth engine was used for flight testing later in the year from Victorville, California. In 2018 ten compliance engines (including two spare engines) were needed for the four Boeing 777-9 flight-test aircraft. Type certification was planned for the fourth quarter of 2018.

On November 10, 2017, a GE9X engine reached a record thrust of 134,300 lbf (597 kN) in Peebles, a new Guinness World Record breaking the GE90-115B 127,900 lbf (569 kN) record set in 2002. The block test engine ran at its operational limits, at triple red-line conditions: maximum fan speed, maximum core speed, and maximum exhaust gas temperature. Icing tests started in Winnipeg at the end of 2017. The initial 777X flight-test engines were shipped in 2018 for an initial 777-9 flight in early 2019. A quarter of the certification testing was done by May 2018: icing, crosswind/inlet distortion, inlet distortion, fan and booster blade vibrations, HP turbine blade vibrations and thermal survey.

=== Flight testing ===
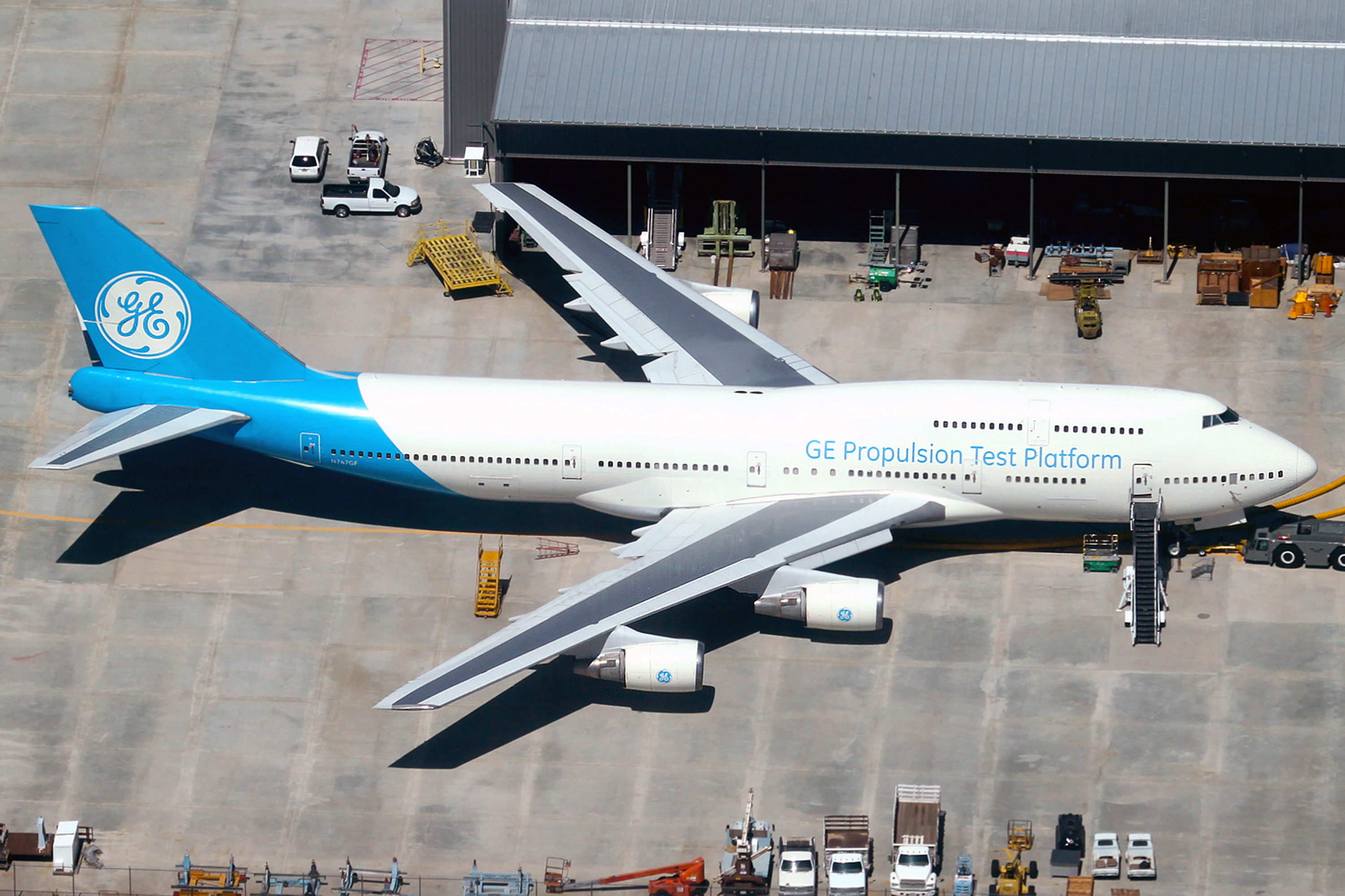
GE Propulsion Test Platform Boeing 747-400

As it was larger than the GE90, the GE9X could only be installed under the wing on the Boeing 747-400 with its larger main gear struts and bigger tires and not the previous 747-100 GE testbed. The engine was tilted 5° more than the GE CF6. Boeing built a specially designed pylon for the testbed. Suspended on a 19 ft (580 cm) strut, the fourth engine of the program began flight testing at the end of 2017. The engine, with a fan diameter of 134 in (340 cm), is installed in a 174 in (440 cm) diameter nacelle, with 1.5 ft (0.46 m) of ground clearance. The engine and nacelle weighed 40,000 lb (18 t) with its new pylon and wing strengthening, compared to 17,000 lb (7.7 t) for the CF6-80C2s and its pylon.

In February 2018, the GE9X's first flight was delayed by problems discovered in the high-pressure compressor (HPC) variable stator vanes (VSV) lever arms. Also a routine A Check on the 747 testbed CF6 engines discovered fan-case corrosion and high pressure turbine airfoils on allowable limits. It first flew on March 13 with the previous design of the VSV lever arm. In early May, the first flight test phase of two was completed after 18 flights and 110 hours of run time; the GE9X high-altitude envelope was explored and its cruise performance evaluated. The second phase was scheduled to begin in the third quarter.

By October 2018, half of the certification was completed, and eight development engines were used, mostly in Peebles, Ohio: #1 was stored; a fan blade was deliberately separated from the fan hub of #2 at takeoff thrust for the blade-out test; #3 was used for crosswind ground testing and cyclic and load testing of the thrust reverser cascade assembly; #4 explored boundaries of the flight envelope such as low altitudes; #5 ran an endurance test with rotors deliberately unbalanced to make the engine shake at the vibration limits allowed in service, a requirement for ETOPS certification; #6 did ingestion tests later in 2018; after LP turbine over-temperature tests, #7 did a second icing test phase in Winnipeg, Manitoba; #8 did the triple redline FAA 150 h endurance test. Eight compliance engines, plus two spares, were required for 777-9 flight testing.

A second phase, of 18 flights, began on December 10 to evaluate the engine control software and hot-and-high performance and lasted until the first quarter of 2019 before FAA certification the same year. By then water ingestion, crosswind, blade-out, hailstone, bird ingestion and block or endurance testing had been completed. Flight tests were based in Victorville, California, and ranged as far as Seattle, Colorado Springs, Colorado, Fairbanks, Alaska, and Yuma, Arizona.

By January 4, 2019, eight test flights and 55 hours of run time had been completed. At the end of January, the turbine case and rear frame strut were damaged during the blade out test and relevant components were redesigned. In early May, the flight test program was completed after 320 hours run time, during which high-altitude cruise fuel burn was established. Engines were modified to a final certifiable configuration standard before the maiden flight of the 777X, delayed beyond the previously expected June 26 by a stator problem at the front of the 11-stage high-pressure compressor. Before certification, final tests included a full durability block test, replacing the usual "triple redline" test at maximum EGT and both rotor speeds, as modern high-bypass ratio engines cannot achieve all maximum conditions near sea level. The high-pressure compressor stator redesign delayed engine certification into autumn, which delayed the 777X first flight until January 2020.

On January 25, 2020, the GE9X had its first flight on the 777X, flying for 3 hours and 52 minutes, before landing at Boeing Field. On September 28, GE announced its FAA type certificate, as eight test engines completed 8,000 cycles and 5,000 hours of running. ETOPS approval needed 3,000 ground-test cycles to be completed as a requirement for entry into service.

In 2022, a different issue with the GE9X paused testing of the 777X.

== Design ==
The GE9X increases fuel efficiency by 10% over the GE90. Its 61:1 overall pressure ratio should help provide a 5% lower thrust specific fuel consumption (TSFC) than the XWB-97 with maintenance costs comparable to the GE90-115B. The initial thrust of 105,000 lbf (470 kN) will be followed by 102,000 and 93,000 lbf (450 and 410 kN) derated variants. GE invested more than $2 billion for its development. Its nacelle is 184 in (4,700 mm) wide.

Most of the efficiency increase comes from the better propulsion efficiency of the higher-bypass-ratio fan. The bypass ratio is planned for 10:1. The fan is housed in 134 in (340 cm) diameter case. The GE9X has 16 blades, whereas the similarly sized GE90 has 22 and the smaller GEnx has 18. Having fewer fan blades reduces the engine weight, improves aerodynamic efficiency, and allows the low pressure (LP) fan and booster to spin faster to better match its speed with the LP turbine. The fan blades feature steel leading edges and fiberglass trailing edges to better absorb bird strikes with more flexibility than carbon fiber. Fourth generation carbon fiber composite materials, comprising the bulk of the fan blades, make them lighter, thinner, stronger, and more efficient. The GE9X also uses a carbon fiber composite fan case, first developed for the GEnx, to further reduce weight.

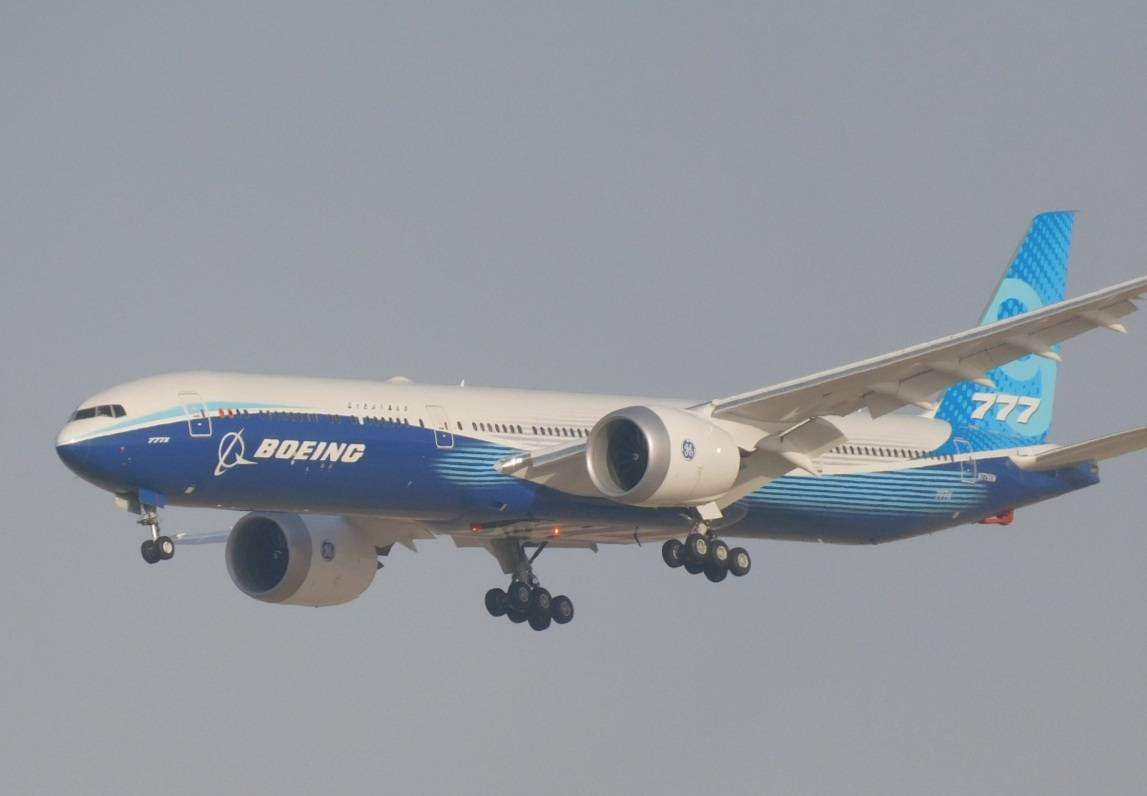
A Boeing 777X prototype flying with the GE9X

The high pressure (HP) compressor is up to 2% more efficient. As the 129.5 in (329 cm) GE90 fan left little room to improve the bypass ratio, GE looked for additional efficiency by upping the overall pressure ratio from 40 to 60, focusing on boosting the high-pressure core's ratio from 19:1 to 27:1 by using 11 compressor stages instead of 9 or 10, and a third-generation, twin-annular pre-swirl (TAPS) combustor instead of the previous dual annular combustor. Able to endure hotter temperatures, ceramic matrix composites (CMC) are used in two combustor liners, two nozzles, and the shroud up from the CFM International LEAP stage 2 turbine shroud. CMCs are not used for the first-stage turbine blades, which have to endure high centrifugal forces and extreme heat. These are improvements planned for the next iteration of engine technology.

The first-stage HP turbine shroud, the first- and second-stage HP turbine nozzles and the inner and outer combustor linings are made from CMC, only static components, operating 500 °F (260 °C) hotter than nickel alloys with some cooling. CMCs have twice the strength at one-third the weight of metal and require 59% less cooling. In total, the engine has 65 CMC components, the most of any commercial aircraft engine at the time of its introduction.

The compressor is designed with 3D aerodynamics and its first five stages are blisks, combined bladed-disk. The combustor is lean burning for greater efficiency and 30% NOx margin to CAEP/8. The compressor and high pressure turbine are made from powdered metal. The low-pressure turbine airfoils made of titanium aluminide (TiAl) are stronger, lighter, and more durable than nickel-based parts. 3D printing is used to manufacture parts that would otherwise be impossible to make using traditional manufacturing processes.

In August 2024, a first production bound engine will be delivered, with a new combustor liner design.

== Specifications ==
GE Aviation GE9X
Variant	-105B1A	-105B1A1	-105B1A2	-105B1A3	-102B1A	-102B1A1	-102B1A2	-102B1A3	-93B1A
Type	Dual rotor, axial flow, high bypass turbofan								
Combustor	Single annular Twin Annulus Premixing Swirler								
Control	dual channel FADEC								
Compressor	1 fan, 3-stage LP, 11-stage HP								
Turbine	2-stage HP, 6-stage LP								
Fan	134 in (3,404 mm) diameter, 16 wide chord composite blades								
Length	224.0 in (5,690 mm) [Fan Spinner to TRF aft most flange]								
Width × Height	161.3 × 163.7 in (4097 × 4158 mm)								
Bypass ratio	10:1								
Overall pressure ratio	60:1, HPC pressure ratio: 27:1								
Weight	21,230 lb (9,630 kg)								
Max takeoff thrust	110,000 lbf (489.3 kN)				102,000 lbf (450 kN)				93,000 lbf (410 kN)
Max continuous thrust	103,500 lbf (460.4 kN)				102,000 lbf (450 kN)				93,000 lbf (410 kN)
Thrust/weight	5.2				4.8				4.4
RPM, 100%	LP 2355, HP 9561								
Notes	Base Model for the 777-9	Modified for Hot and High Conditions	Refined -105B1A for specific airline routes	Most recent variation of the -105B1A	Derated version of the -105B1A	Same as their higher-rated counterparts			Intended for 777-8

== See also ==
Related development

- General Electric GE90
- General Electric GEnx

Comparable engines

- Rolls-Royce Trent 7000
- Rolls-Royce Trent XWB
- Rolls-Royce Advance (future)

Related lists

- List of aircraft engines
