= General Electric GEnx =

Turbofan jet engine

GEnx

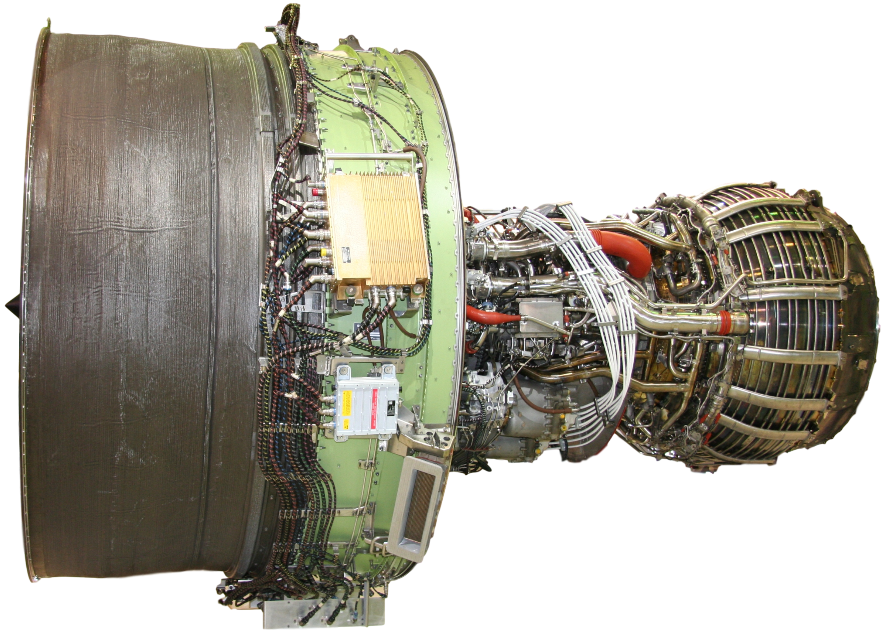
- General Electric GEnx at the Paris Air Show 2009
- Type: Turbofan
- National origin: United States
- Manufacturer: GE Aerospace
- First run: 2006
- Major applications: Boeing 747-8; Boeing 787 Dreamliner
- Developed from: General Electric GE90
- Developed into: CFM International LEAP; General Electric GE9X

The General Electric GEnx ("General Electric Next-generation") is an advanced dual rotor, axial flow, high-bypass turbofan jet engine in production by GE Aerospace. It is one of two engine options available for the Boeing 787 Dreamliner, and it was also produced for the Boeing 747-8. The GEnx succeeds the CF6 in GE's product line.

== Development ==
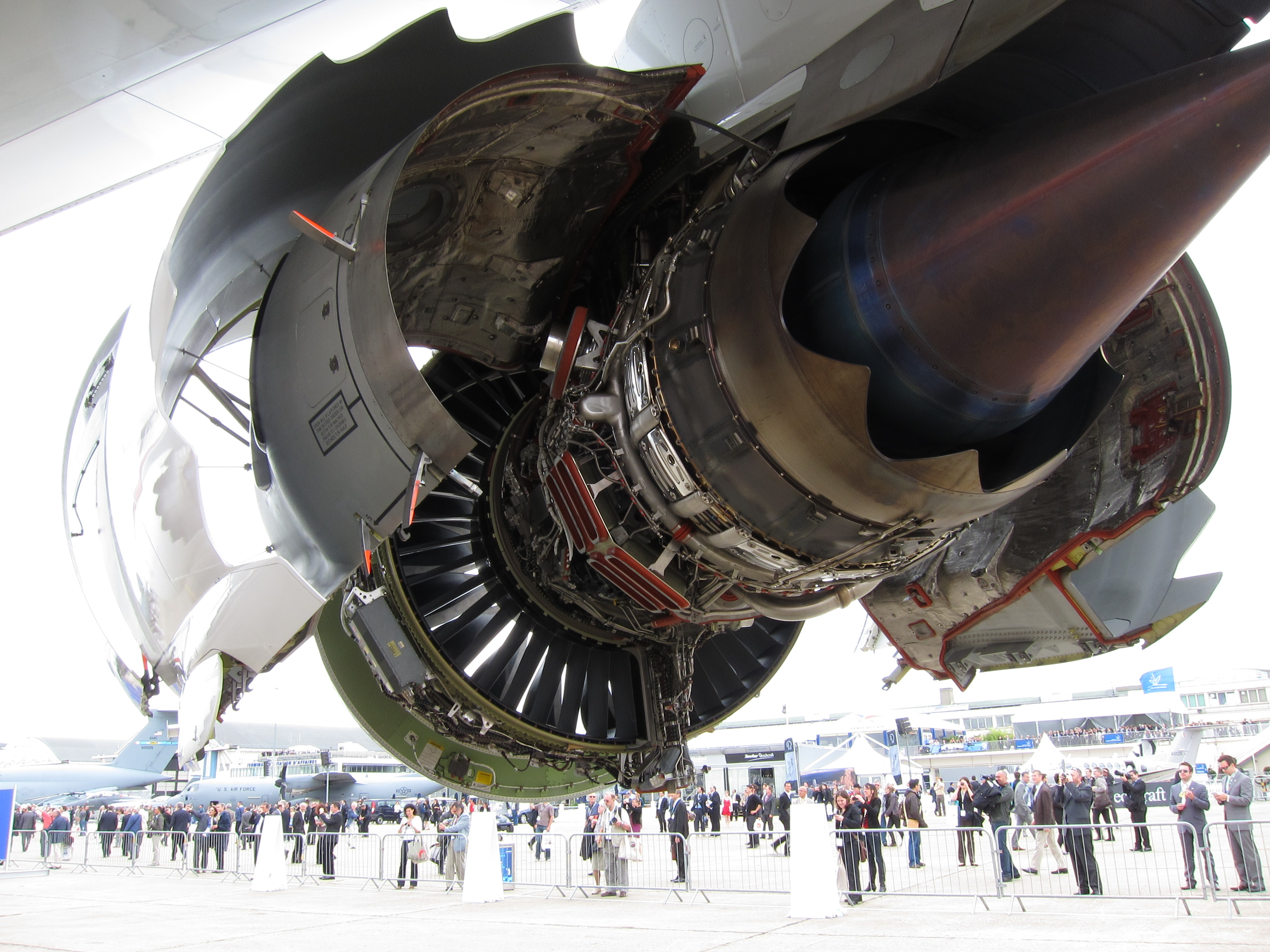
GEnx on 747-8i prototype

In 2004 the GEnx and the Rolls-Royce Trent 1000 were selected by Boeing after evaluating proposals from GE, RR and P&W, with the PW-EXX. The GEnx uses some technology from the GE90 turbofan, including swept composite fan blades and the 10-stage high-pressure compressor (HPC) featured in earlier variants of the engine. It also uses composite materials in the fan case.

The engine market for the 787 is estimated at US$40 billion over the next 25 years. GE eliminated the bleed air system using high temperature/high pressure air from the propulsion engines to power aircraft systems such as the starting, air-conditioning and anti-ice systems. Both engines enable the move towards the More Electric Aircraft, that is, the concept of replacing previously hydraulic and pneumatic systems with electrical ones to reduce weight, increase efficiency, and reduce maintenance requirements.

The GEnx was expected to produce thrust from 53,000 to 75,000 lbf (240 to 330 kN) with first tests commencing in 2006 and service entry by 2008 (delayed by 787 deliveries). Boeing predicted reduced fuel consumption of up to 20% and significantly lower noise than previous turbofan engines. A 66,500 lbf (300 kN) thrust version (GEnx-2B67) is used on the 747-8. Unlike the initial version for the 787, this version has a traditional bleed air system to power internal pneumatic and ventilation systems. It also has a smaller overall diameter than the initial model to accommodate installation on the 747.

In March 2006 General Electric began initial test runs of the bleedless GEnx variant. The first flight with one of these engines took place on 22 February 2007, using a Boeing 747-100, fitted with one GEnx engine in the number 2 (inboard left side) position.

By fall 2019, General Electric was offering the GEnx-2B, developed for the 747-8, for the revised 767-XF variant based on the 767-400ER, but needed enough volume to cover the new product certification.

== Design ==
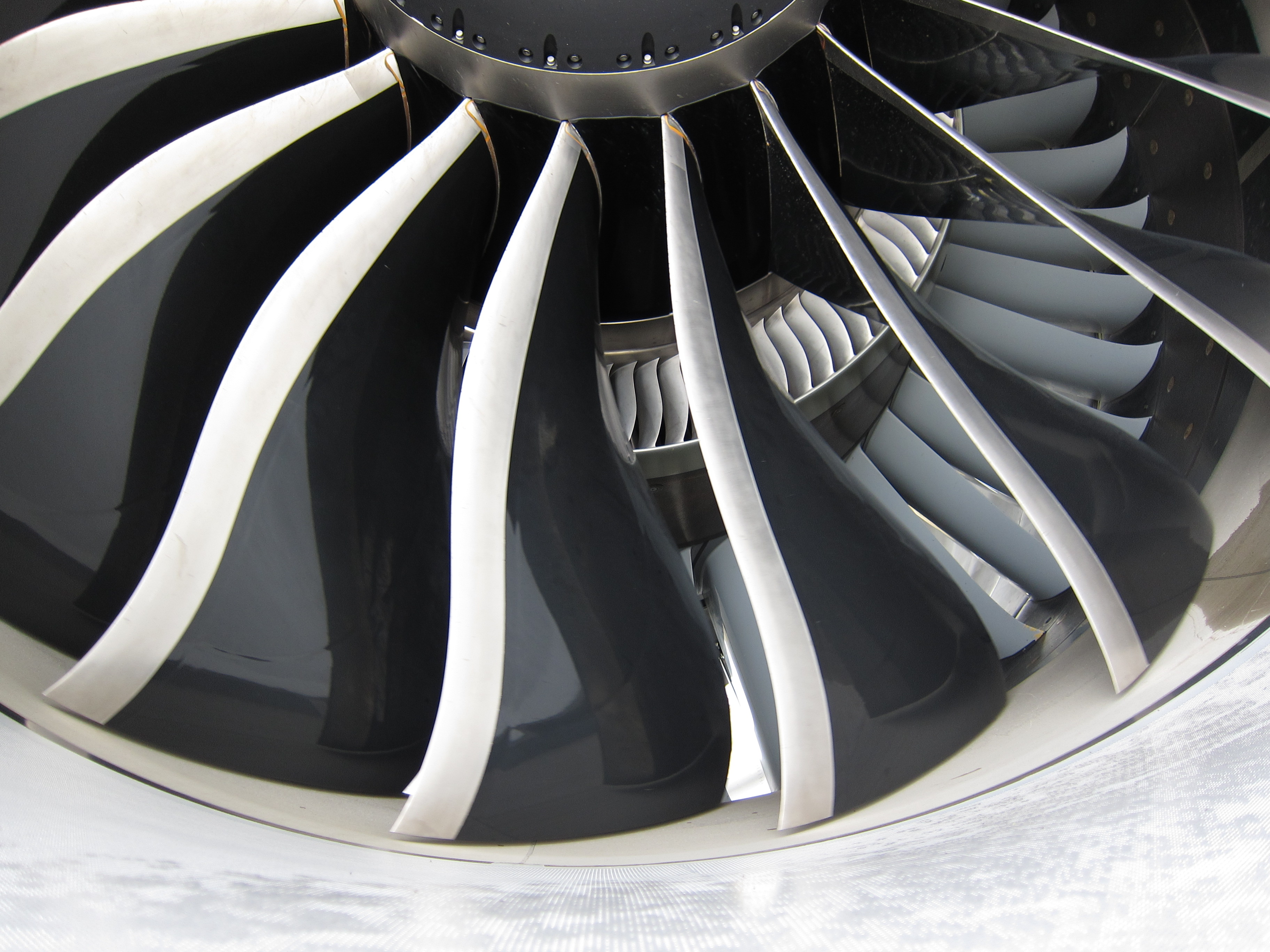
Fan blades and outlet guide vanes of GEnx-2B

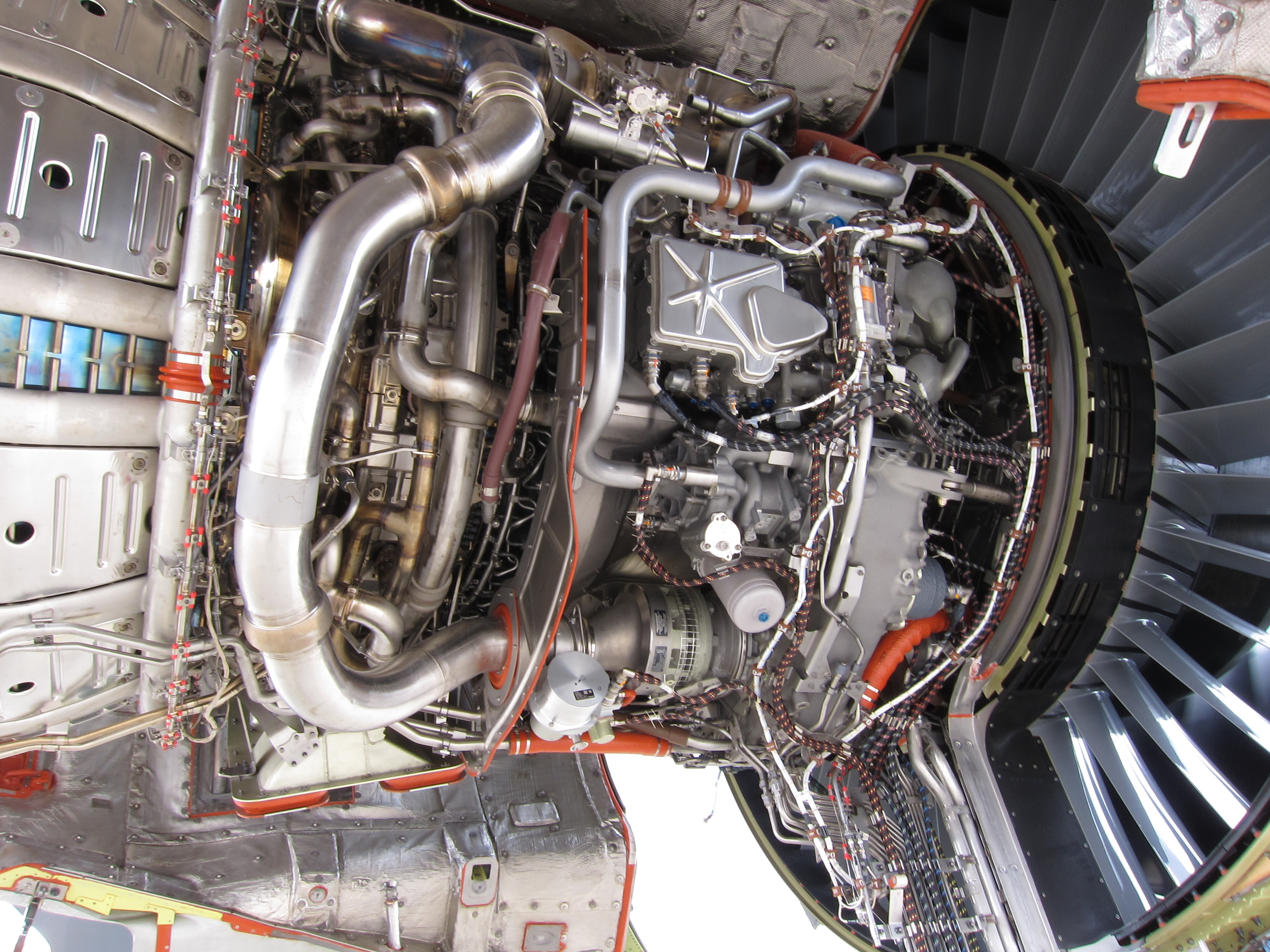
Detail of GEnx core

The GEnx is derived from the GE90 with a fan diameter of 111.1 in (282 cm) for the 787 and 104.7 in (266 cm) for the 747-8. To reduce weight, it features 18 composite fan blades, a composite fan case and titanium aluminide stage 6 and 7 low-pressure turbine blades. Fuel efficiency is improved by 15% compared to the CF6, the bypass ratio reaches up to 9.0:1 and the overall pressure ratio up to 58.1:1. It has a 10 stage high-pressure compressor and is quieter, helped by larger, more efficient fan blades.

It stays on wing 20% longer, uses 30% fewer parts to lower maintenance costs and has a contra-rotating architecture. The Lean TAPS combustor reduces NOx gases with required pressure loss and backflow margin.

Fan blades have steel alloy leading edges and the composite fan case reduces thermal expansion. To reduce fuel burn, the 23:1 pressure ratio high-pressure compressor is based on the GE90-94B, shrouded guide vanes reduce secondary flows and counter-rotating spools for the reaction turbines reduce load on guide vanes.

To reduce maintenance cost and increase engine life, spools with lower parts count are achieved by using blisks in some stages, low blade counts in other stages and by using fewer stages; internal engine temperatures are reduced due to more efficient cooling techniques and debris extraction within the low-pressure compressor protects the high-pressure compressor.

== Operational history ==
Introduced in late 2011 on a 747-8 freighter, Cargolux surpassed one million flight hours in early 2017.

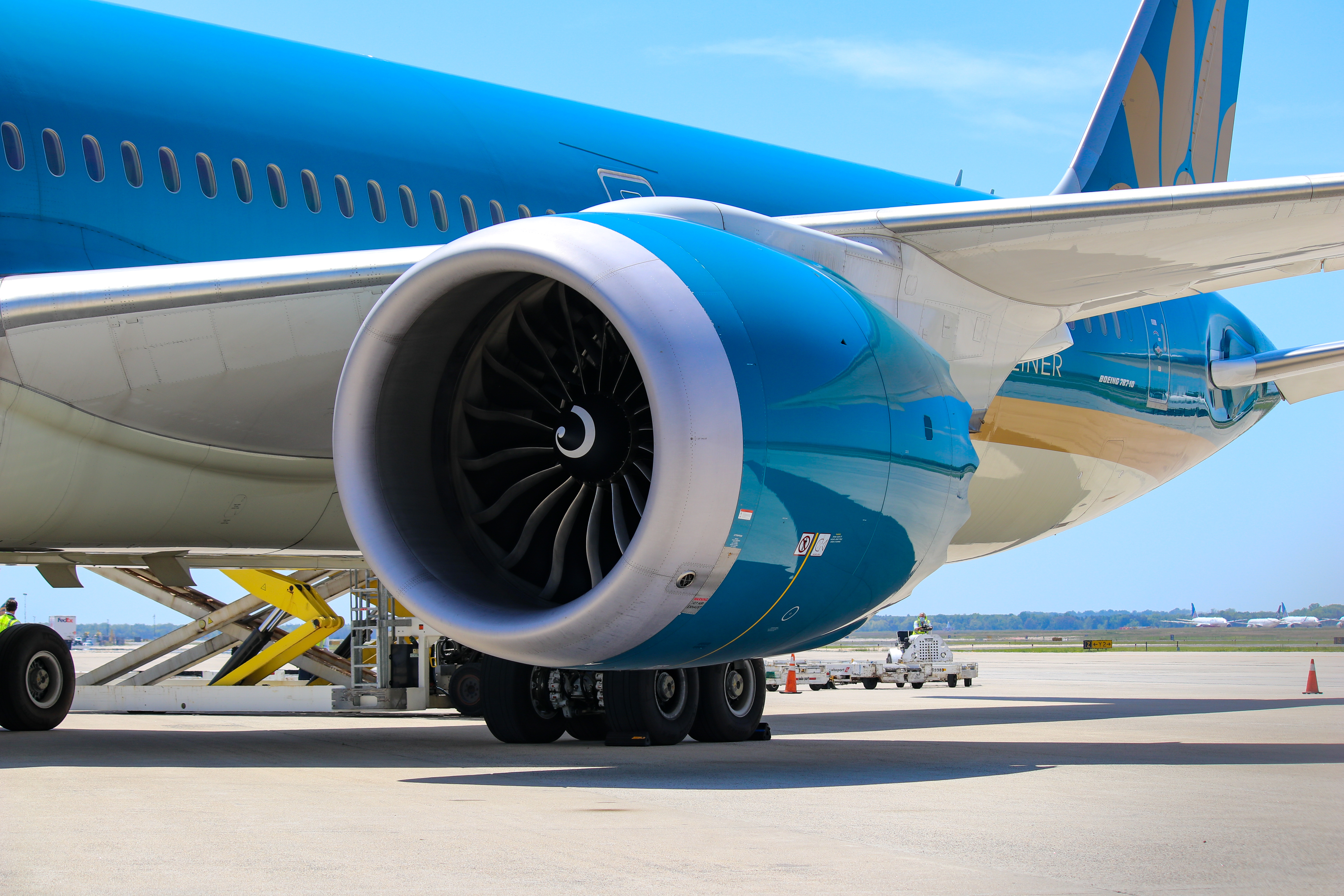
A GEnx-1B on a Vietnam Airlines 787-10

On July 28, 2012, the NTSB initiated an investigation of an engine failure that occurred on a Boeing 787 during a pre-delivery taxi test in Charleston, South Carolina.

The engine's fan midshaft (FMS) was found to have fractured at the forward end of the shaft, rear of the threads where the retaining nut is installed.

On August 31, 2012, a GEnx-1B engine installed on a Boeing 787 that had not yet flown was found to have an indication of a crack on the fan midshaft at a similar location to the fracture that caused the earlier July 28 engine failure. The fan midshaft was removed from the engine for further inspection and examination. The NTSB's investigative work later confirmed that both engine midshafts had faults at similar locations.

On September 11, 2012, an AirBridgeCargo 747-8F experienced a major engine malfunction that spread a significant amount of metallic debris on the runway when the low-pressure turbine shaft separated and shifted backwards, damaging the low pressure turbine blades and vanes. The NTSB issued urgent safety recommendations to the FAA to require ultrasonic scans for midshaft fractures before use of GEnx engines and require repetitive on-wing inspections of the engine to detect cracks.

During the spring and summer of 2013, GE learned of four 747-8F freighters that suffered icing in their engines at altitudes of 40,000 feet (12,192 m) and above. The most serious incident involved an AirBridgeCargo freighter; on July 31, while at an altitude of 41,000 feet (12,497 m) over China, the flight crew noted two engines surging while a third lost substantial power. The pilots were able to land the plane safely but the engines were found to have sustained damage. Among the possible factors cited was "'unique convective weather systems' such as unusually large thunderstorms reaching high altitudes." Boeing is working with GE on software solutions to the problem. Altitude was restricted until GE changed the software to detect the high-altitude ice crystals and open bleed air valve doors to eject them before they enter the core.

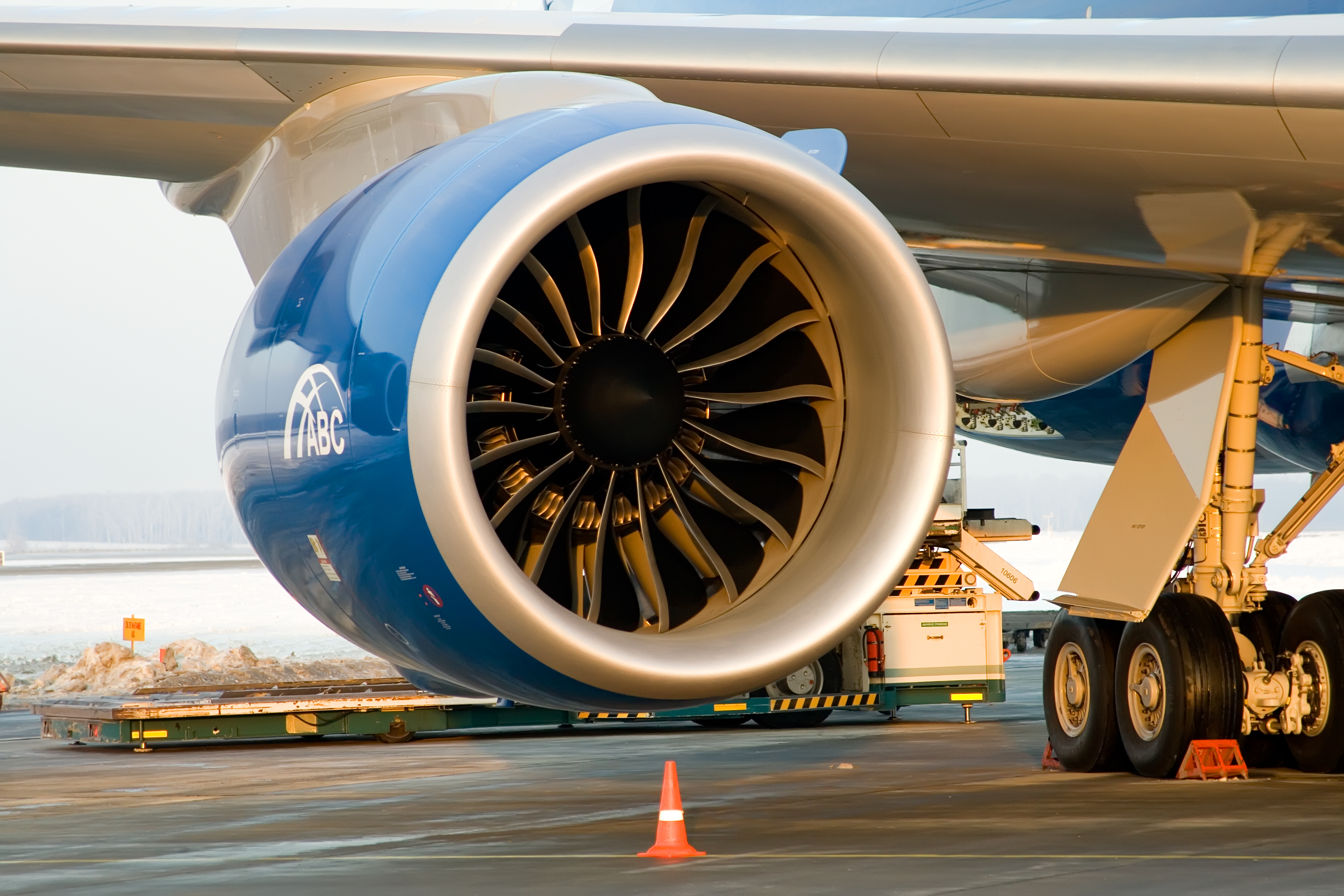
A GEnx-2B on an AirBridgeCargo 747-8F

In March 2014, a GEnx-powered Boeing 787 had its first in-flight shut down in operation when a Japan Airlines (JAL) flight had to divert to Honolulu after an oil pressure alert, bringing its in-flight shut down rate to 1 per 278,000 hours. In January 2016 a JAL 787 had an inflight shutdown after flying through icing conditions, caused by ice formed on fan blades and ingested: the blades moved forward slightly and rubbed on the abradable seal in the casing. In March 2016, the US FAA ordered emergency fixes on the GEnx-1B PIP2. The airworthiness directive affects 43 Boeing 787 Dreamliners in the US. Abradable material in the casing in front of the fan blades was ground to keep them from rubbing when ingesting ice or debris on 330 GEnx PIP-2.

In early 2018, of 1,277 orders for the Boeing 787, 681 selected the GEnx (53.3%), 420 the Rolls-Royce Trent 1000 (32.9%) and 176 were undecided (13.8%). The 2,000th GEnx was delivered by November 2019, 15 years after the engine launch, as it logged 4.5 million flight cycles and 26 million hours among 60 operators.

On June 12, 2025, Air India Flight 171, a Boeing 787-8 powered by two GEnx-1B engines crashed after struggling to gain altitude during the initial climb phase. GE Aerospace announced they will send a team to India to aid the investigation. A preliminary report of the crash, published by the Air Accident Investigation Bureau of India, noted that shortly after the aircraft lifted off the ground, the fuel control switches in the cockpit transitioned from RUN to CUTOFF. Fuel supply to the engines was cut off and the engines lost power.

== Applications ==
- Boeing 747-8
- Boeing 787

== Variants ==
GEnx-1B/2B variants
Family	Designation	EASA certification	Continuous	Take-off rating
GEnx-1B	GEnx-1B54	29 March 2011	250.4 kN (56,300 lbf)	255.3 kN (57,400 lbf)
GEnx-1B	GEnx-1B58	29 March 2011	250.4 kN (56,300 lbf)	271.3 kN (61,000 lbf)
GEnx-1B	GEnx-1B64	29 March 2011	273.6 kN (61,500 lbf)	298.0 kN (67,000 lbf)
GEnx-1B	GEnx-1B67	29 March 2011	273.6 kN (61,500 lbf)	308.7 kN (69,400 lbf)
GEnx-1B	GEnx-1B70	29 March 2011	295.8 kN (66,500 lbf)	321.6 kN (72,300 lbf)
GEnx-1B/P1	GEnx-1B54/P1	3 July 2012	250.4 kN (56,300 lbf)	255.3 kN (57,400 lbf)
GEnx-1B/P1	GEnx-1B58/P1	3 July 2012	250.4 kN (56,300 lbf)	271.3 kN (61,000 lbf)
GEnx-1B/P1	GEnx-1B64/P1	3 July 2012	273.6 kN (61,500 lbf)	298.0 kN (67,000 lbf)
GEnx-1B/P1	GEnx-1B67/P1	3 July 2012	273.6 kN (61,500 lbf)	308.7 kN (69,400 lbf)
GEnx-1B/P1	GEnx-1B70/P1	3 July 2012	295.8 kN (66,500 lbf)	321.6 kN (72,300 lbf)
GEnx-1B/P1	GEnx-1B70/72/P1	3 July 2012	295.8 kN (66,500 lbf)	321.6 kN (72,300 lbf)
GEnx-1B/P1	GEnx-1B70/75/P1	3 July 2012	295.8 kN (66,500 lbf)	321.6 kN (72,300 lbf)
GEnx-1B/P1	GEnx-1B74/75/P1	3 July 2012	305.1 kN (68,600 lbf)	341.2 kN (76,700 lbf)
GEnx-1B/P1	GEnx-1B75/P1	3 July 2012	306.0 kN (68,800 lbf)	345.2 kN (77,600 lbf)
GEnx-1B/P2	GEnx-1B54/P2	24 June 2013	250.4 kN (56,300 lbf)	255.3 kN (57,400 lbf)
GEnx-1B/P2	GEnx-1B58/P2	24 June 2013	250.4 kN (56,300 lbf)	271.3 kN (61,000 lbf)
GEnx-1B/P2	GEnx-1B64/P2	24 June 2013	273.6 kN (61,500 lbf)	298.0 kN (67,000 lbf)
GEnx-1B/P2	GEnx-1B67/P2	17 May 2018	273.6 kN (61,500 lbf)	308.7 kN (69,400 lbf)
GEnx-1B/P2	GEnx-1B70/P2	24 June 2013	295.8 kN (66,500 lbf)	321.6 kN (72,300 lbf)
GEnx-1B/P2	GEnx-1B70/72/P2	24 June 2013	295.8 kN (66,500 lbf)	321.6 kN (72,300 lbf)
GEnx-1B/P2	GEnx-1B70/75/P2	24 June 2013	295.8 kN (66,500 lbf)	321.6 kN (72,300 lbf)
GEnx-1B/P2	GEnx-1B74/75/P2	24 June 2013	305.1 kN (68,600 lbf)	341.2 kN (76,700 lbf)
GEnx-1B/P2	GEnx-1B75/P2	24 June 2013	306.0 kN (68,800 lbf)	345.2 kN (77,600 lbf)
GEnx-1B/P2	GEnx-1B76/P2	24 June 2013	305.2 kN (68,600 lbf)	349.2 kN (78,500 lbf)
GEnx-1B/P2	GEnx-1B76A/P2	24 June 2013	305.2 kN (68,600 lbf)	349.2 kN (78,500 lbf)
GEnx-1B/P2	GEnx-1B78/P2	24 June 2013	305.1 kN (68,600 lbf)	357.6 kN (80,400 lbf)
GEnx-2B	GEnx-2B67	29 March 2011	260.2 kN (58,500 lbf)	299.8 kN (67,400 lbf)
GEnx-2B	GEnx-2B67B	21 October 2011	260.2 kN (58,500 lbf)	299.8 kN (67,400 lbf)
GEnx-2B	GEnx-2B67/P	24 January 2014	260.2 kN (58,500 lbf)	299.8 kN (67,400 lbf)

== Specifications ==
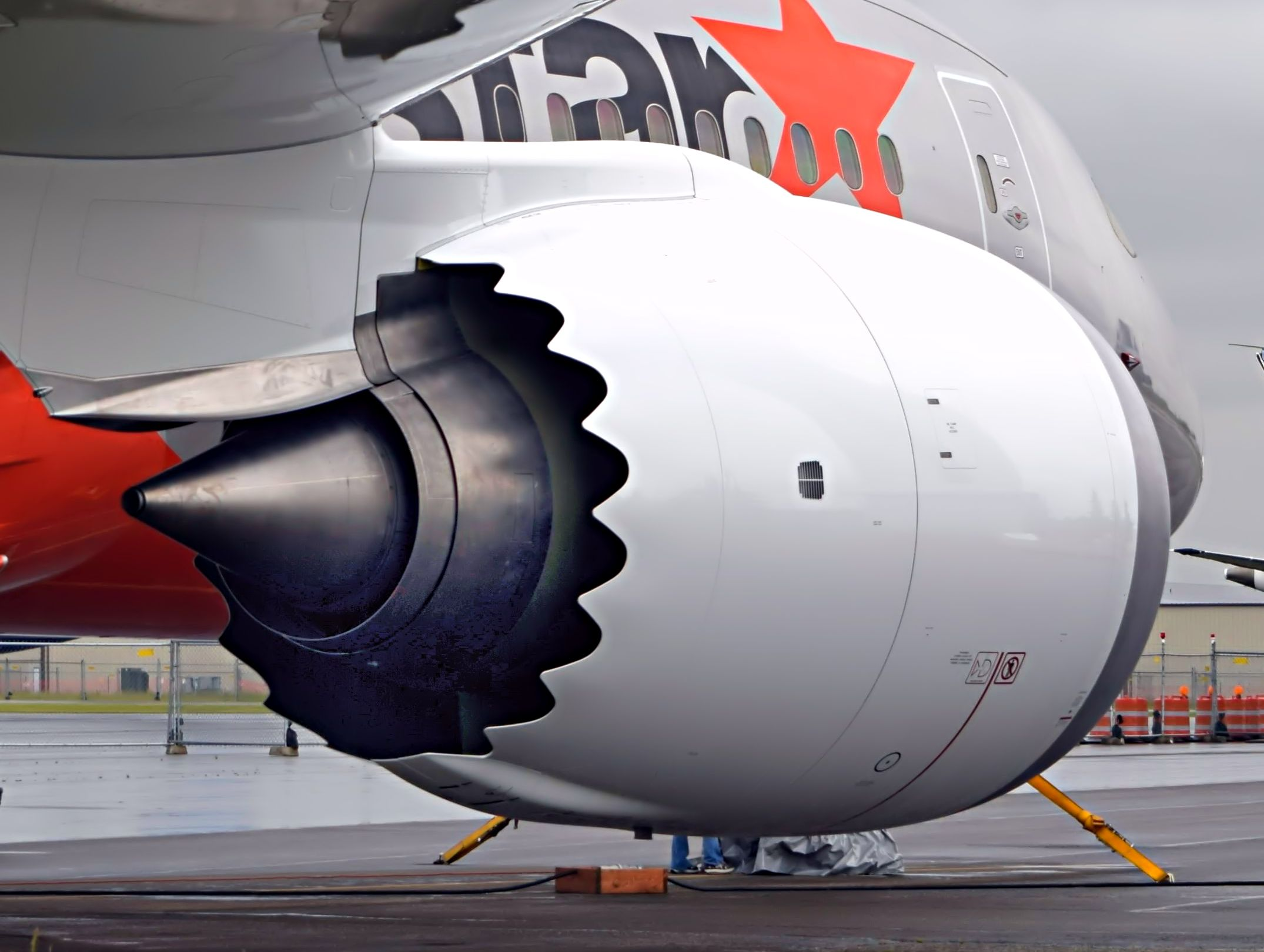
Rear view of a GEnx-1B on a Jetstar 787-8, showing noise-reducing chevrons

Data sheet
Variant	-1B70	-1B74/75	-1B76/78	-2B67B
Application	Boeing 787-8	787-9	787-10	747-8
Fan diameter	111.1 in (282 cm)			104.7 in (266 cm)
Compressor	1 fan, 4 LP, 10 HP			1 fan, 3 LP, 10 HP
Turbine	2 HP, 7 LP			2 HP, 6 LP
Takeoff thrust	69,800 lbf (310 kN)	74,100 lbf (330 kN)	76,100 lbf (339 kN)	66,500 lbf (296 kN)
Takeoff bypass ratio	9.3	9.1	9.1	8.0
Takeoff OPR	43.8	46.3	47.4	44.7
Top-of-climb OPR	53.3	55.4	58.1	52.4
Takeoff air per second	2,559 lb (1,161 kg)	2,624 lb (1,190 kg)	2,658 lb (1,206 kg)	2,297 lb (1,042 kg)
Flange to flange	184.7 in (469 cm)			169.7 in (431 cm)
Nominal RPM	LP 2,560, HP 11,377			LP 2,835, HP 11,377
Dry weight	13,552 lb (6,147 kg)			12,397 lb (5,623 kg)
Thrust/weight	5.15	5.47	5.62	5.36

== See also ==
Related development

- General Electric GE90
- General Electric GE9X

Comparable engines

- Engine Alliance GP7000
- Rolls-Royce Trent 900
- Rolls-Royce Trent 1000
- Rolls-Royce Trent XWB
- Rolls-Royce Trent 7000

Related lists

- List of aircraft engines
