= Rolls-Royce Trent XWB =

Turbofan aircraft engine

Trent XWB
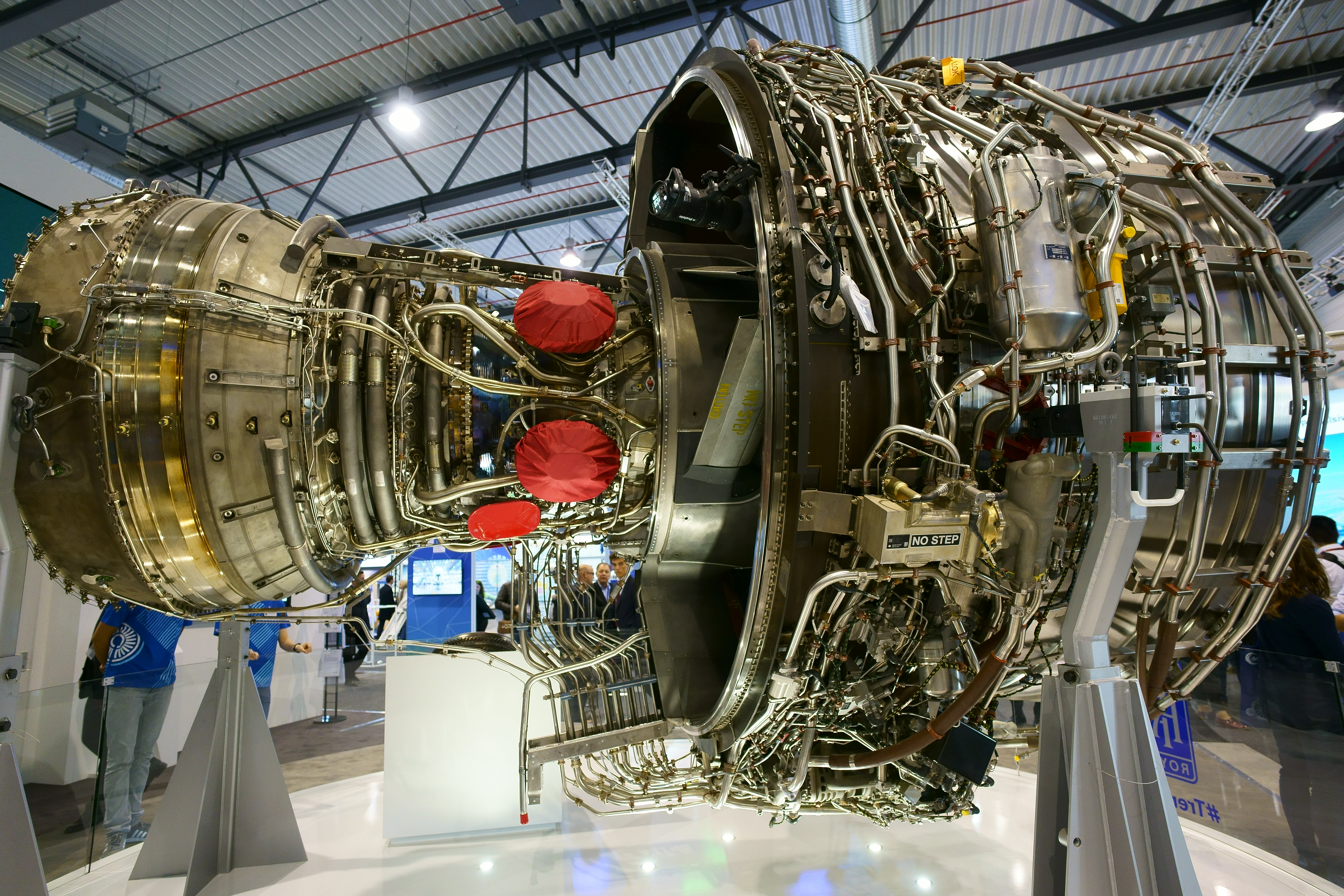
- Type: Turbofan
- National origin: United Kingdom
- Manufacturer: Rolls-Royce Holdings
- First run: 14 June 2010
- Major applications: Airbus A350
- Developed from: Rolls-Royce Trent

The Rolls-Royce Trent XWB is a high-bypass turbofan produced by Rolls-Royce Holdings. In July 2006, the Trent XWB (eXtra Wide Body) was selected to exclusively power the Airbus A350. The first engine was run on 14 June 2010, it first flew on an A380 testbed on 18 February 2012, was certified in early 2013, and first flew on an A350 on 14 June 2013. It had its first in-flight shutdown on 11 September 2018 as the fleet accumulated 2.2 million flight hours. It keeps the characteristic three-shaft layout of the Rolls-Royce Trent, with a 3 m (120 in) fan, an IP and HP spool. The 84,200–97,000 lbf (375–431 kN) engine has a 9.6:1 bypass ratio and a 50:1 pressure ratio. It is the most powerful member of the Trent family.

== Development ==
By 2004, the European Airbus consortium had been facing pressure from customers to develop a competitor to the Boeing 787 Dreamliner so, in October 2005, it launched the Airbus A350, at the time an improved version of the Airbus A330. Rolls-Royce initially offered a conventional bleed air engine variant of the Rolls-Royce Trent 1000 with a throttle-push to 75,000 lbf (330 kN) static thrust, the Trent 1700. In 2006, after a review of the Airbus A350, Rolls-Royce reached an agreement to supply all versions of the aircraft with a brand-new Trent XWB variant with 75,000 to 95,000 lbf (330 to 420 kN) of thrust.

Before the December 2008 design freeze, Airbus established that the A350's empty weight was 2.2 t (4,900 lb) greater than the 133.5 t (294,000 lb) target. Due to this, the MTOW was increased by 3 t (6,600 lb) in order to maintain the payload and range capability. As a further result, Rolls-Royce announced that the nominal engine thrusts were increased slightly, each variant receiving an additional 1,000 lbf (4 kN) thrust. A350 programme chief Didier Evrard was quoted as saying that the change had a "very marginal" impact on fuel consumption. This was then revised again in 2011, and the engines for the largest A350 were uprated to 97,000 lbf (430 kN) to meet new performance requirements, and better compete with the Boeing 777-300ER.

=== Testing ===
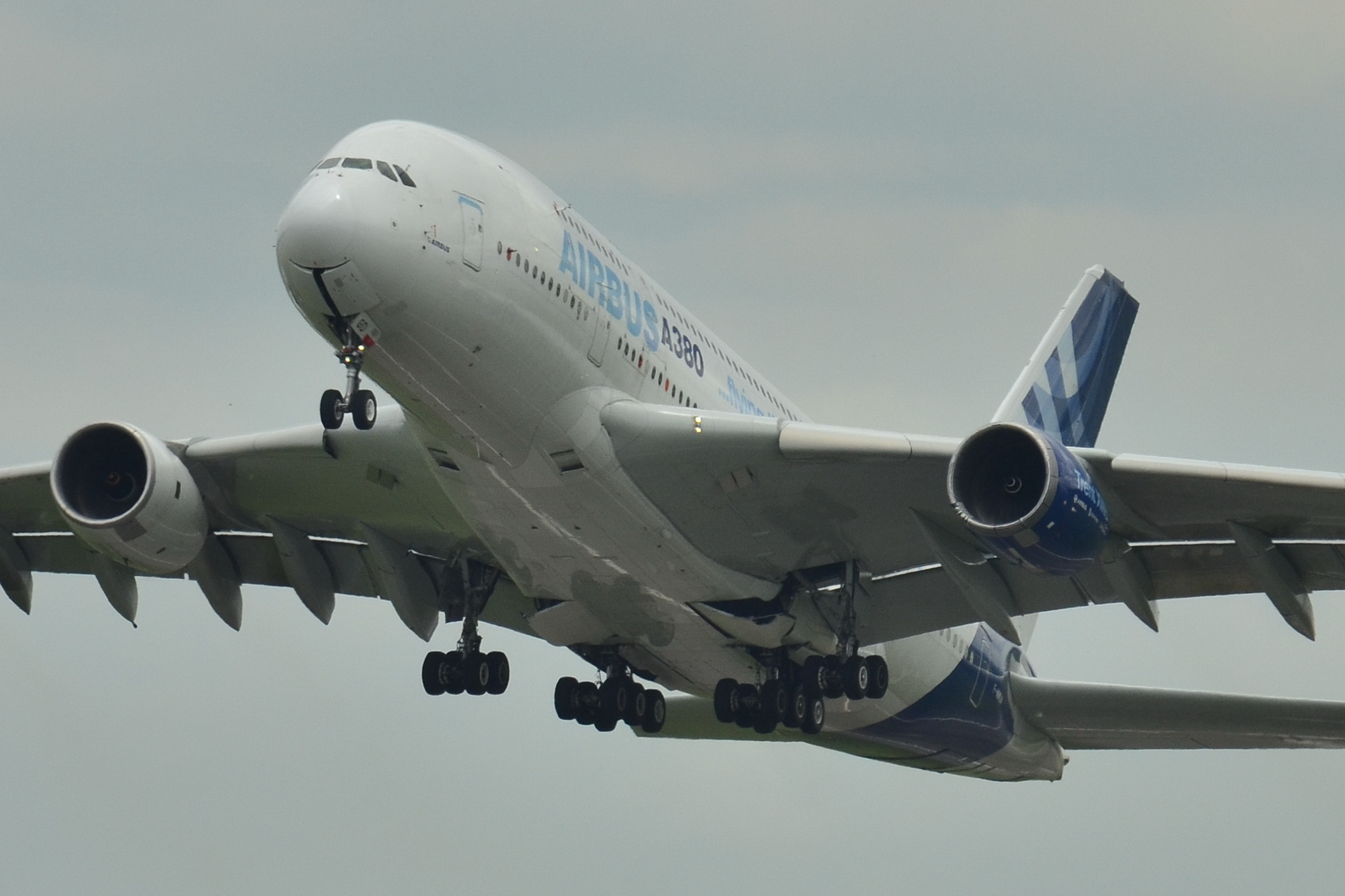
A380 flight tests, blue nacelle at right

The first engine test on a static test-bed was made on 14 June 2010. On 18 February 2012, Airbus announced that the Trent XWB had successfully made its maiden flight aboard Airbus’ dedicated Airbus A380 flying test bed. By October, the first engine was expected to enter service in 2014, and certification for the early engine variants was achieved in early 2013. The first flight of the Trent XWB powering the Airbus A350 XWB took place on 14 June 2013.

On 15 May 2014 Rolls-Royce delivered the first production 84,000 lbf (370 kN) thrust Trent XWB engines intended for the first Airbus A350 XWB to enter service with Qatar Airways - final assembly of these production engines had started in February 2014. On 15 July 2014 Rolls-Royce announced the first run of the Trent XWB-97 powerplant with 97,000 lbf (430 kN) thrust for the Airbus A350-1000.

=== Operations ===
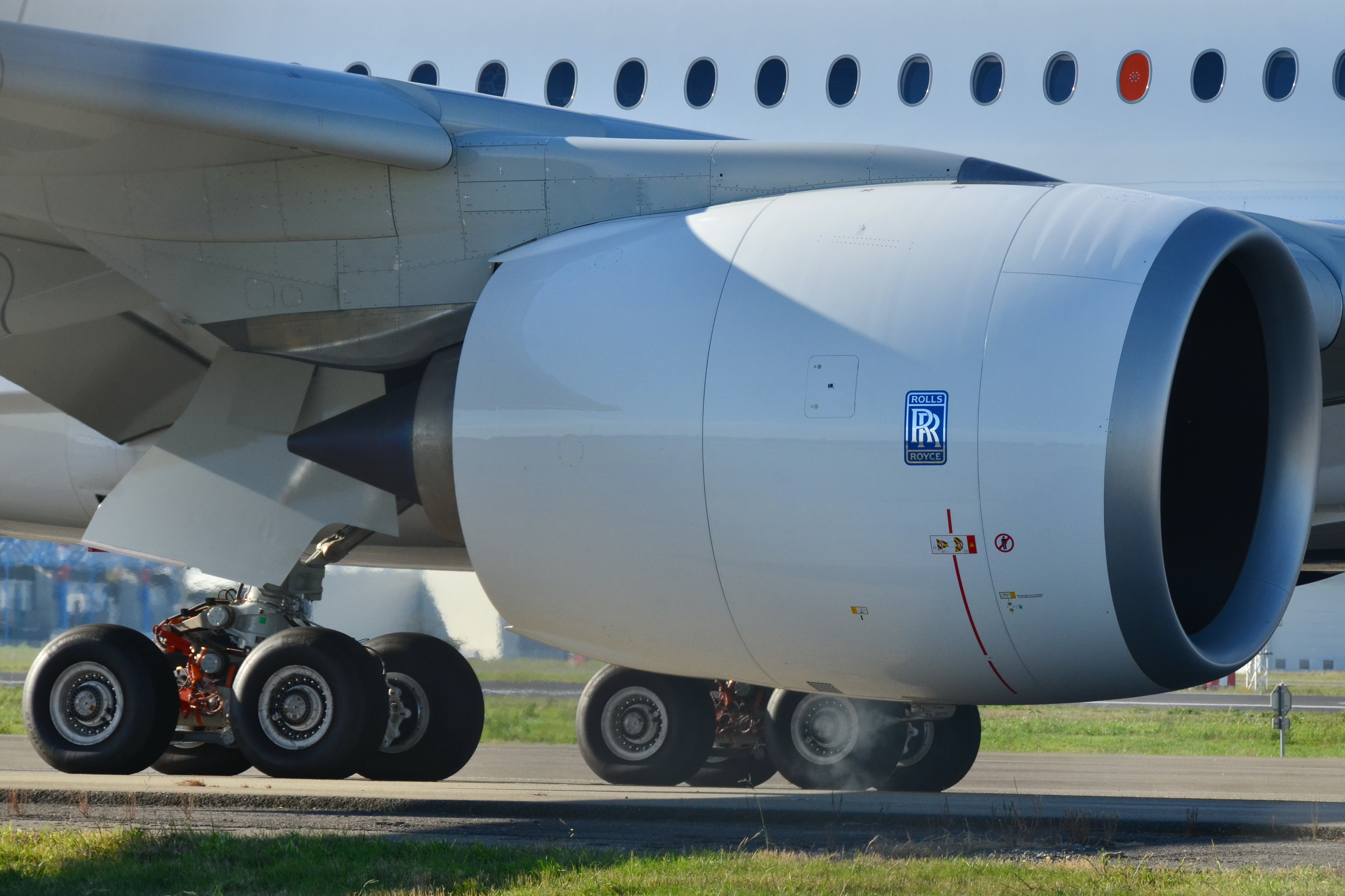
Nacelle installation on the Airbus A350 XWB

On 26 July 2017, Airbus delivered the 100th A350, on track for 10 per month by 2018 end, and over the first 30 months most engine removals have been to stagger the on-wing life of a particular aircraft or to collect in-service data; nine in ten of the Trent XWBs have a long-term service agreements with Rolls-Royce, which has designated seven shops as MRO providers: its Derby facility, its joint ventures with HAECO, SIAEC, N3 Engine Overhaul Services and independents Delta TechOps, Mubadala and Air France Industries-KLM. It passed 1 million flight hours in October 2017 without any in-flight disruptions and with a dispatch reliability of 99.4%.

By February 2018, the Trent XWB has completed 1.3 million flight hours with a 99.9% dispatch reliability. It took two years to reach one million flying hours and nine months for the second million by July 2018, as 500 were delivered; at that time, it had a 99.9% dispatch reliability and had had no in-flight shutdown. As the fleet accumulated 2.2 million flight hours and the leading engine has operated 3,500 cycles, an Iberia A350-900 delivered at the end of July diverted to Boston after an inflight shutdown at 41,000 ft (12,000 m) on 11 September 2018 flight from New York to Madrid, apparently due to slight secondary damage on variable stator vanes.

In 2019, the unit losses on the XWB-84 were reduced by over 20%, as Rolls-Royce expected break-even by the end of 2020, while fleet-leading engines had flown over 22,000h without a shop visit. The higher-thrust XWB-97 for the A350-1000 remains a loss-maker, and could stay that way as extending time-on-wing is more profitable.

At the 2023 Dubai Airshow, the president of the Emirates, Tim Clark, said the A350-1000's engine, Trent XWB-97, would offer only a quarter of the time between maintenance visits compared to their needs. Citigroup analysts claim these comments form part of the airline's "commercial negotiation" tactics involving prices or guarantees. They claim the higher thrust 97-XWB would be expected to run at higher temperatures with faster wear, particularly in hot and sandy climates, noting Qatar Airways operates the Trent XWB-97 without major issues. Rolls-Royce was later reported to be working with Emirates to improve durability in "hot and sandy conditions"

On 2 September 2024, a Trent XWB powered Cathay Pacific A350-1000 suffered an in-flight engine fire. The aircraft was able to land safely, and the airline conducted an inspection of all 48 of its A350s, finding several with a defect similar to the incident aircraft, said to be a damaged flexible fuel line. The European Union Aviation Safety Agency announced that it would require a one-time inspection of Trent XWB engines as a result of the incident.

Qantas Project Sunrise A350-1000ULR test flight, at Melbourne Airport

In December 2024, Airbus introduced the Trent XWB-84 Enhanced Performance (EP), incorporating technical refinements that provide a further 1% reduction in fuel burn and a 2 dB noise reduction over the standard model. It is certified for 50% SAF blends, with future capability for 100% SAF, while improving the engine's overall hardware durability and fleet cost-efficiency.

On 23 July 2026, Airbus conducted the longest test flight ever for any commercial aircraft for the new A350-1000ULR developed for Qantas, which reached a total flight time of 24 hours and 24 minutes. The goal of the flight with MSN707 was to showcase that the aircraft, powered by two Rolls-Royce Trent XWB-97 engines could sustain a continuous flight time of over 23 hours, which would be mandatory when Project Sunrise flights start.

== Design ==
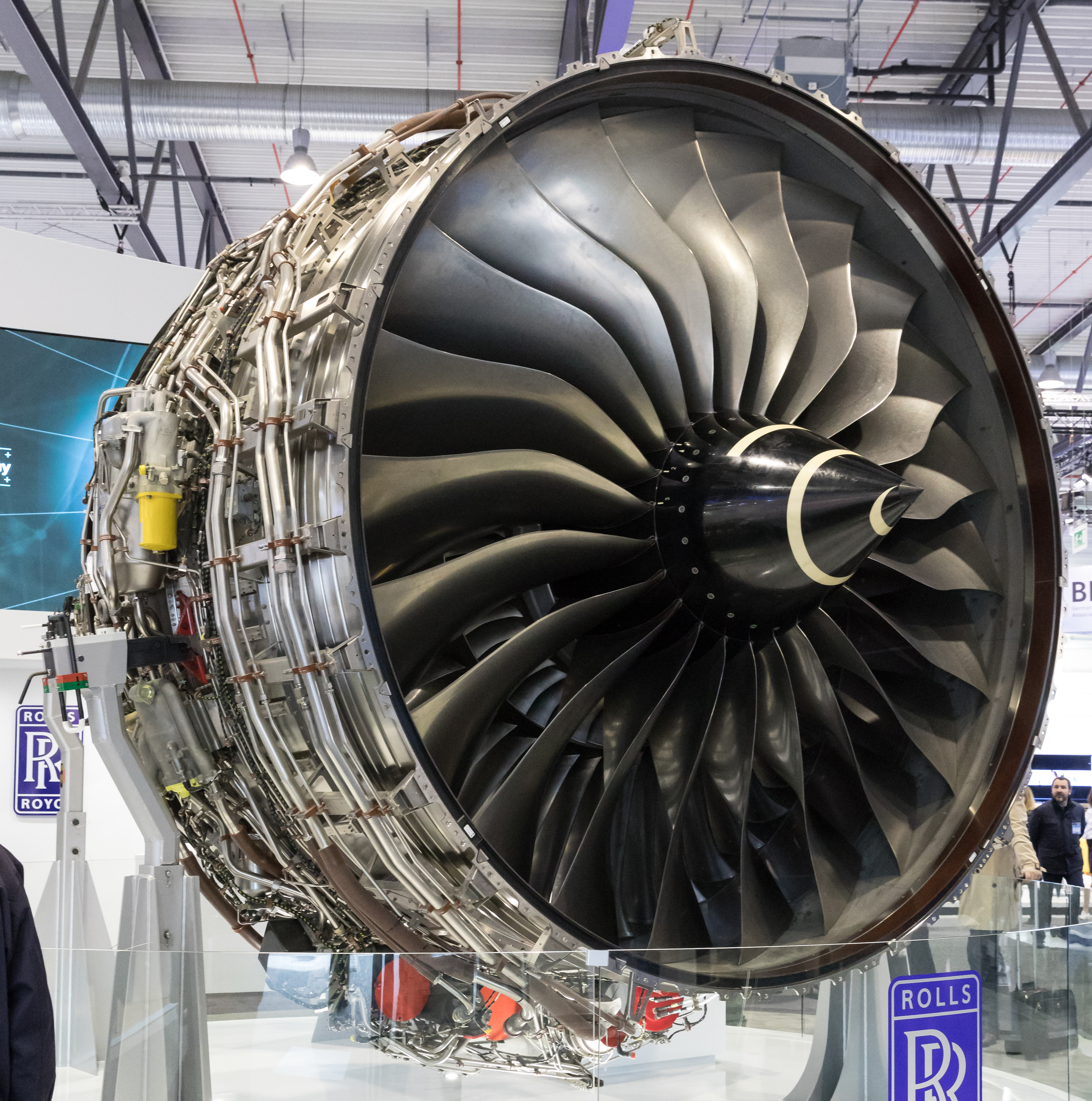
22 blades, 3.00 m (118 in) fan

The Trent XWB is an axial flow high bypass turbofan keeping the characteristic coaxial three-shaft architecture of the Trent family. The 3 m (120 in) fan is driven by a 6-stage turbine; an 8-stage IP compressor is powered by a 2-stage turbine (rather than a single stage used on previous Trent engines). The LP and IP shafts rotate in the same direction. The HP shaft turns the other way; a single-stage turbine drives a six-stage compressor.

The 97,000 lbf (430 kN) engine version for the A350-1000 maintains the same 3m fan size and a 5% larger core. The additional thrust will require the fan to run 6% faster which will require strengthening to withstand the increased fan-blade forces produced. It has thicker titanium fan blades and a stronger fan casing and takes advantage of technologies developed through the European Environmentally Friendly Engine (EFE) research programme. Its core operating temperature capability will be increased.

The engine features a rubber-tipped spinner, a patented design innovation developed by a graduate to mitigate ice accumulation at high altitudes. The natural vibration of the flexible rubber prevents ice crystals from forming on the cone, where ice first forms, ensuring they are shed before they can enter the engine intake and cause potential damage.

== Orders ==
On 18 June 2007, Rolls-Royce announced that it had signed a contract with Qatar Airways worth US$5.6 billion at list prices, to power 80 Airbus A350 XWBs: US$35 million each.

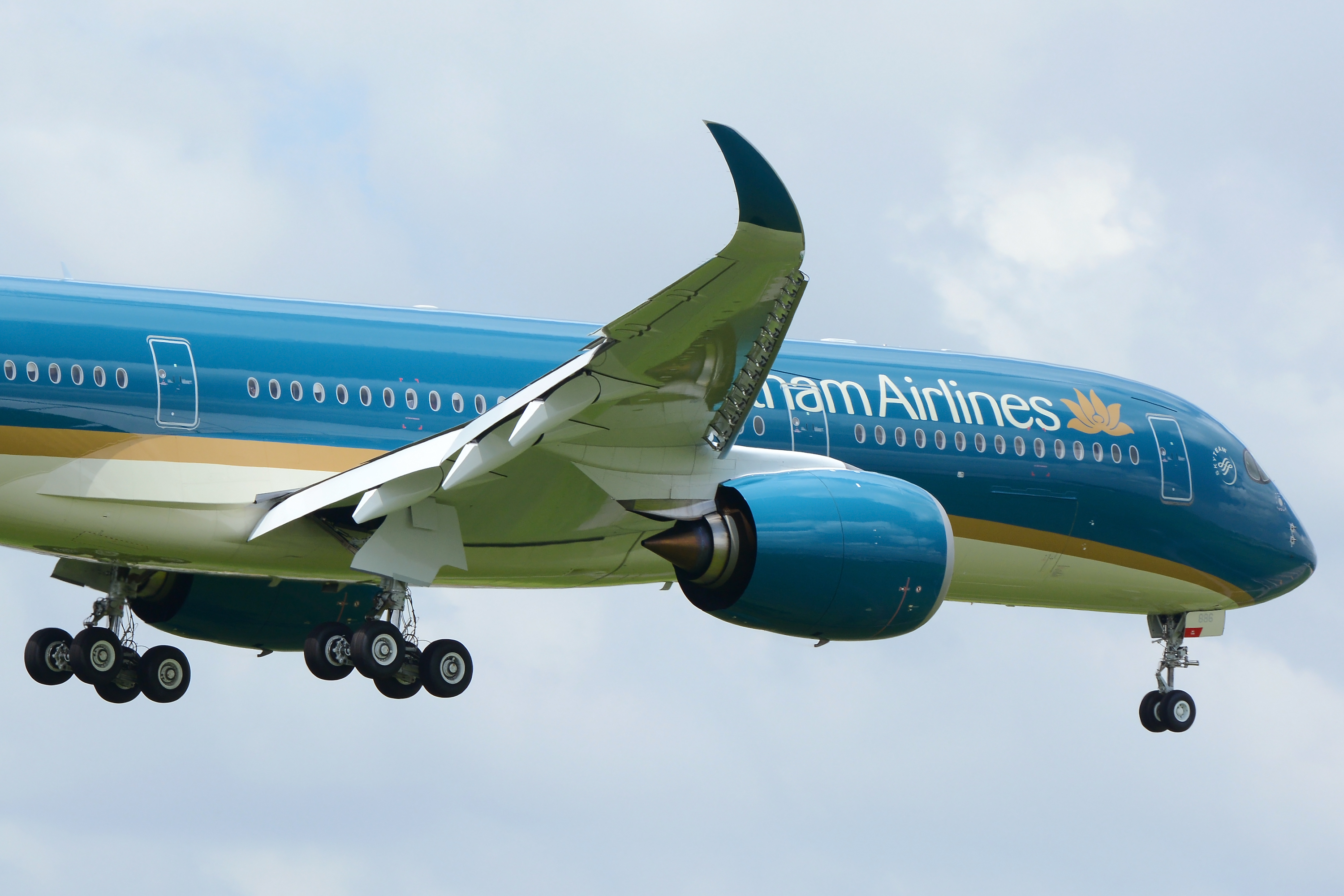
A Vietnam Airlines Airbus A350-900 with its Trent XWB engines

A large contract with Emirates to power 70 aircraft with Trent XWBs was announced on 11 November 2007, but never filled. The announced contract concerned 50 A350-900 and 20 A350-1000 aircraft, with a further 50 option rights. Due to be delivered from 2014, the Emirates order was potentially worth up to $8.4 billion at list prices, including options. However, on 11 June 2014, Airbus announced that Emirates had decided to cancel its order of 70 A350 XWB aircraft.

More than 1,500 engines had been sold by July 2015 to 40 customers. Rolls-Royce offered its maintenance programme to Vietnam Airlines for £340 million for 14 airplanes, or £12.1 million per engine.

On May 2022, Qantas signed a contract for 12 A350-1000ULRs powered by Rolls Royce Trent XWB-97 engines for Project Sunrise, which demanded maximum efficiency across long-haul flights.

On 15 December 2023, Rolls-Royce announced that Turkish Airlines had ordered 100 XWB-84 and 40 XWB-97 engines. In addition to the airline's existing 66 Trent engines, resulting in a total of nearly 210, the airline has become the largest operator of Trent XWB engines.

== Variants ==
Trent XWB variants
| Designation | Certified | Net Take-off Rating | Net Maximum Continuous |
|---|---|---|---|
| Trent XWB-75 | 7 February 2013 | 74,200 lbf (330 kN) | 66,600 lbf (296 kN) |
| Trent XWB-79 | 7 February 2013 | 78,900 lbf (351 kN) | 71,400 lbf (318 kN) |
| Trent XWB-79B | 7 February 2013 | 78,900 lbf (351 kN) | 71,400 lbf (318 kN) |
| Trent XWB-84 | 7 February 2013 | 84,200 lbf (375 kN) | 71,400 lbf (318 kN) |
| Trent XWB-97 | 31 August 2017 | 97,000 lbf (430 kN) | 83,100 lbf (370 kN) |
| Trent XWB-75EP | 3 December 2024 | 74,200 lbf (330 kN) | 66,600 lbf (296 kN) |
| Trent XWB-79EP | 3 December 2024 | 78,900 lbf (351 kN) | 71,400 lbf (318 kN) |
| Trent XWB-79BEP | 3 December 2024 | 78,900 lbf (351 kN) | 71,400 lbf (318 kN) |
| Trent XWB-84EP | 3 December 2024 | 84,200 lbf (375 kN) | 71,400 lbf (318 kN) |

== Specifications ==
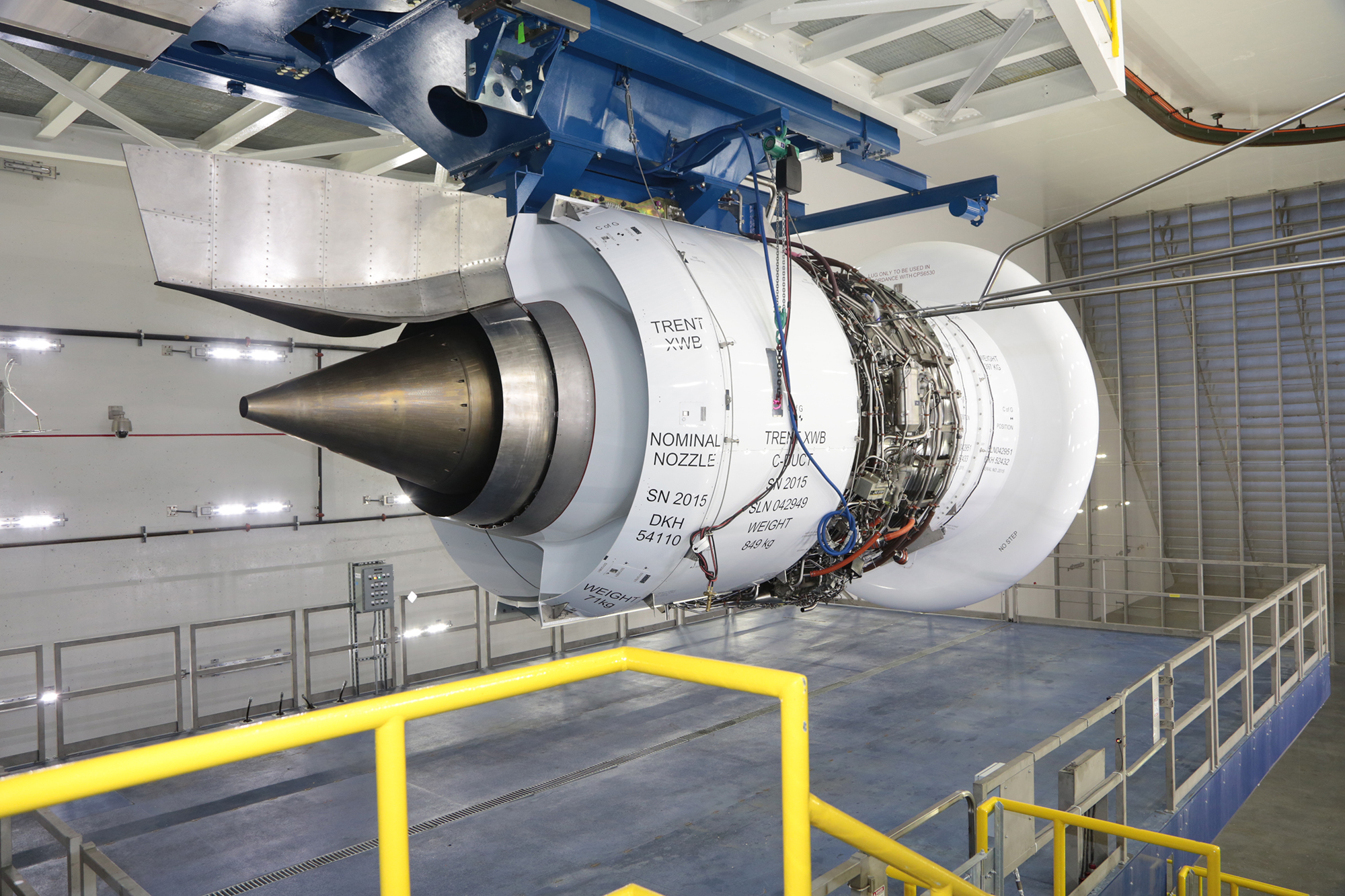
In a Delta TechOps Test Cell

Type Certificate Data Sheet
| Variant | -84 | -97 |
|---|---|---|
| Type | Three-shaft, high bypass ratio, axial flow, turbofan | |
| Fan | 1-stage, 3.00 m / 118" diameter, 22 blades (Note: swept fan, low hub:tip ratio) | |
| Compressor | 8-stage IP, 6-stage HP | |
| Combustor | annular, 20 fuel spray nozzles | |
| Turbine | single stage HP, 2-stage IP, 6-stage LP (Note: one more IP stage than previous Trents, air-cooled HPT and IPT, uncooled LPT) | |
| Length | 5,812 mm / 228.8 in (Note: tip of spinner to rear of Cold Nozzle) | |
| Dry weight | 7,277 kg (16,043 lb) original 7,000 kg (15,000 lb) EP | 7,549 kg (16,643 lb) |
| Takeoff thrust | 84,200 lbf (375 kN) | 97,000 lbf (431 kN) |
| TSFC (cruise) | | 0.478 lb/(lbf⋅h) (13.5 g/(kN⋅s)) |
| Specific impulse | | 7,530 s |
| Rotor speed (RPM) | LP: 2700, IP: 8200, HP: 12600 | |
| Bypass ratio | 9.6:1 | |
| Pressure ratio | 50:1 | |
| Thrust-to-weight ratio | 5.25 | 5.82 |
| Air mass flow | 1,436 kg/s / 3,166 lb/s | |

== See also ==
Related development

- Rolls-Royce Trent 1000

Comparable engines

- General Electric GEnx
- General Electric GE9X

Related lists

- List of aircraft engines
