= Carlton Forge Works =

American aerospace company

Carlton Forge Works is an aerospace manufacturing company that produces seamless rolled rings. Carlton was founded in 1929 and was privately held. According to Manta and Business Week, the company has about 250-300 employees. The company was previously owned by Allan Carlton.

Carlton Forge Works manufactures mostly rolled rings by open-die forging and some forged parts by closed-die forging. The forged rings or forged parts are often refer to as “forgings” in the forging or aerospace industry. The forgings are made using either ferrous metals or nonferrous metals. However, Carlton utilizes mainly nonferrous metals. Properties of nonferrous alloys are resistance to corrosion, electrical conductivity, and ease of fabrication. The production of these materials, for example, includes titanium, aluminum, iron, nickel, cobalt based alloys, stainless steels, carbon steels, copper, and lead.

The primary products of Carlton Forge Works are rotating and structural components, land-based turbine engines, and aircraft parts for commercial and military aviation; the company serves the aerospace, gas turbine, commercial, and nuclear industries. Unlike other forge shops, Carlton makes high quality forgings for major customers such as General Electric, United Technologies (Pratt & Whitney), Honeywell International, Rolls-Royce, GKN, MTU, Mitsubishi, Samsung, and other smaller companies. Although not a large corporation, its departments consist of sales, purchasing, accounting, production, engineering, manufacturing, metallurgy, and quality.

== History ==
Since its inception in 1929, Carlton Forge Works' business experienced expansion and contraction. The revenues of the company have gone up and down due to the cycle of the aerospace industry. In the past, there had been reported layoffs. Carlton is located in Paramount California and has two websites, carltonforgeworks.com as their primary website and pccforgedproducts.com/brands as part of parent company PCC.

In 2009, Precision Castparts Corporation (PCC) acquired Carlton Forge Works in a $850 million deal that broadened the company's forging operations. The transaction also includes another hammer forging operation in Oxnard, California, called Arcturus Manufacturing Corporation. The CEO of PCC Mark Donegan said that Carlton had been a target for acquisition for a long time because the company had been doing several big aerospace projects, including the Boeing 787 and Airbus aircraft. Furthermore, the acquisition enables PCC to provide a full range of products to current customers, and increases the forging capabilities.
