= Airbus A340 =

Four-engined twin-aisle airliner family

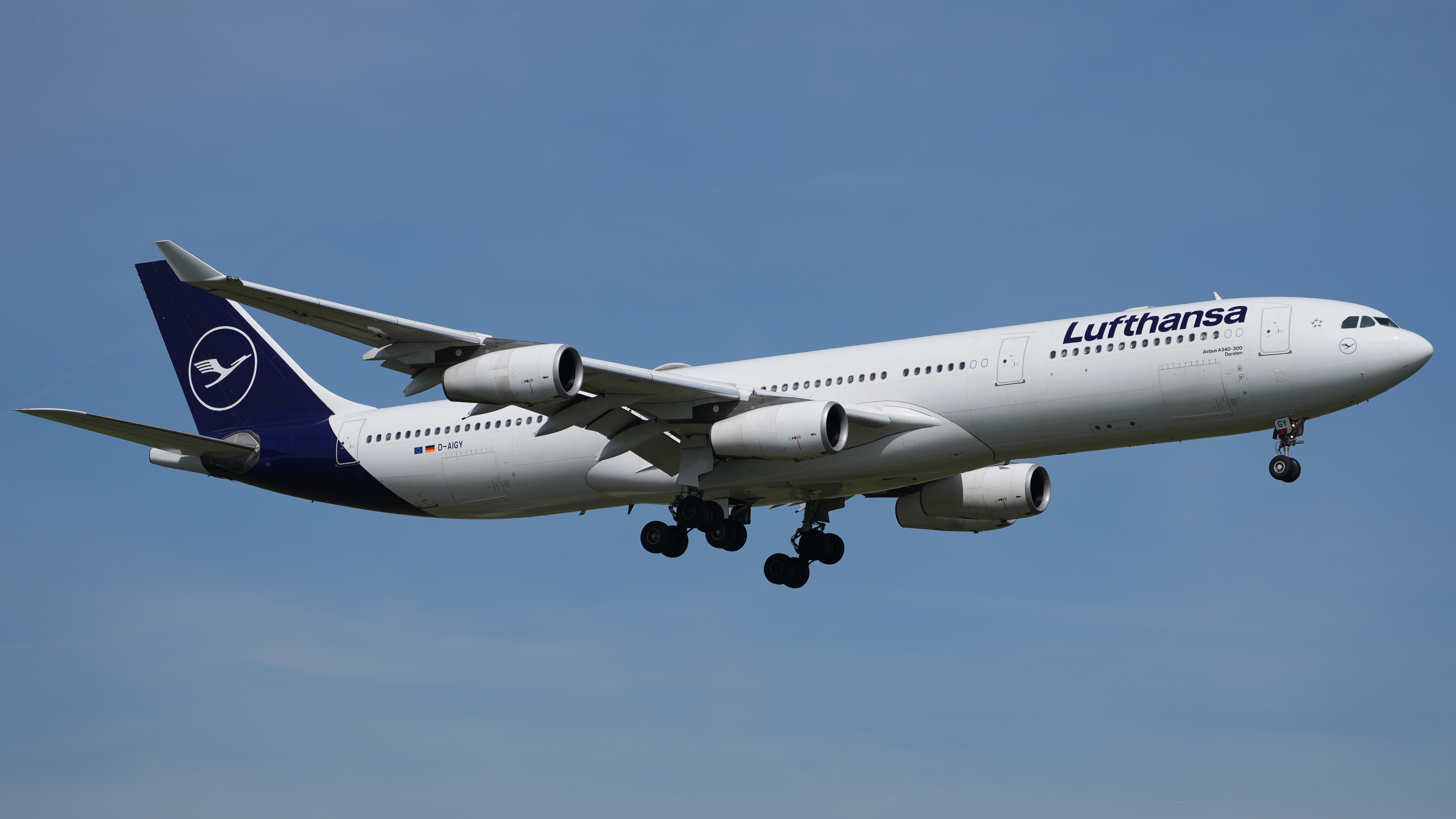
- An Airbus A340-300 operated by Lufthansa, one of the two launch customers of the aircraft family, as well as its largest operator

General information
- Role: Wide-body airliner
- National origin: Multi-national (Note: Final assembly in France.)
- Manufacturer: Airbus
- Status: In service
- Primary users: Lufthansa: Mahan Air; Conviasa; Edelweiss Air
- Number built: 377

History
- Manufactured: 1991–2012
- Introduction date: 15 March 1993 with Lufthansa and Air France
- First flight: 25 October 1991; 35 years ago
- Developed from: Airbus A300

The Airbus A340 is a long-range, wide-body passenger airliner that was developed and produced by Airbus.

In the mid-1970s, Airbus conceived several derivatives of the A300, its first airliner, and developed the A340 quadjet in parallel with the A330 twinjet. In June 1987, Airbus launched both designs with their first orders, with the A340-300 taking its maiden flight on 25 October 1991. It was certified along with the A340-200 on 22 December 1992, and both versions entered service in March 1993 with launch customers Lufthansa and Air France. The larger A340-500 and -600 were launched on 8 December 1997; the A340-600 first flying on 23 April 2001 and entering service on 1 August 2002.

Keeping the eight-abreast economy cross-section of the A300, the early A340-200 and -300 has a similar airframe to the A330-200 and -300, sharing a wing design yet having slightly different fuselage lengths. Other differences include four 151 kN (34,000 lbf) CFM56s instead of two high-thrust turbofans to bypass ETOPS restrictions on trans-oceanic routes, and a three-leg main landing gear instead of two for a heavier 276 t (608,000 lb) Maximum Takeoff Weight (MTOW). Both airliners have fly-by-wire controls, first introduced on the A320, as well as a similar glass cockpit. The A340-500 and -600 both have significantly longer fuselages, a larger wing, and are powered by 275 kN (62,000 lbf) Rolls-Royce Trent 500 for a heavier 380 t (840,000 lb) MTOW.

The shortest A340-200 measured 59.4 m (194 ft 11 in), and has a 15,000-kilometre (8,100-nautical-mile; 9,300-mile) range with 210–250 seats in a three-class configuration. The most common A340-300 reaches 63.7 m (209 ft 0 in) to accommodate 250–290 passengers and could cover 13,500 km (7,300 nmi; 8,400 mi). The A340-500 is 67.9 m (222 ft 9 in) long to seat 270–310 over 16,670 km (9,000 nmi; 10,360 mi), the longest-range airliner at the time. The longest A340-600 is stretched to 75.4 m (247 ft 5 in), in its day the longest airliner, to accommodate 320–370 passengers to cover 14,450 km (7,800 nmi; 8,980 mi).

As improving engine reliability allowed ETOPS operations for almost all routes, more economical twinjets such as the Boeing 777 replaced the A340 and other quadjets on many routes, leading to the A340's declining sales and gradual withdrawal from service, and in response Airbus developed the A350 as the successor. On 10 November 2011, Airbus announced that the production reached its end, after 380 orders had been placed and 377 delivered from Toulouse, France. As of February 2026, there were 71 A340 aircraft in active service with 27 operators worldwide.

== Development ==
=== Background ===
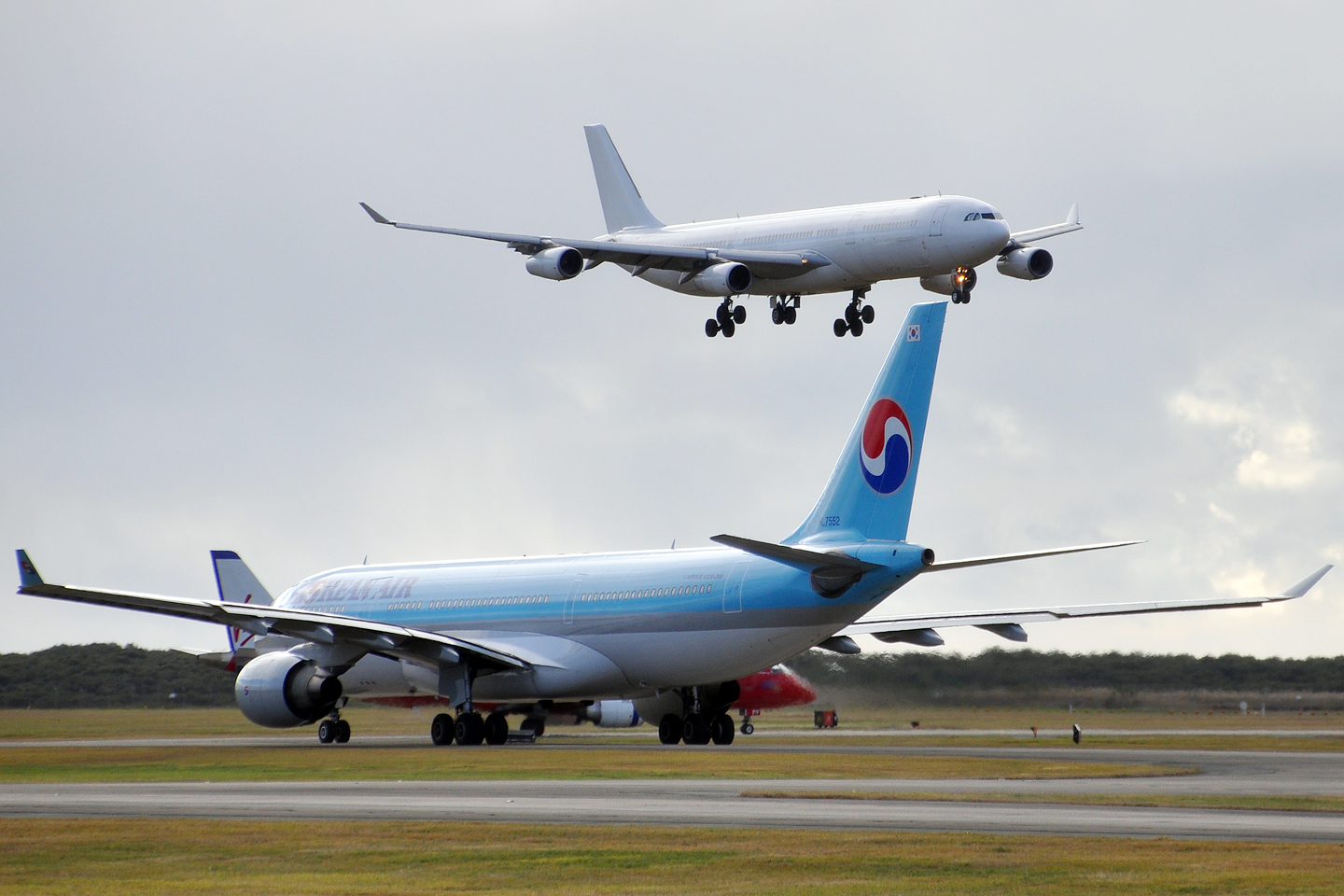
Compared to the A340 quadjet (flying), the lighter A330 (on ground) has two engines and no centre-line wheel bogie.

When Airbus designed the Airbus A300 during the 1970s it envisioned a broad family of airliners to compete against Boeing and McDonnell Douglas, two established US aerospace manufacturers. From the moment of formation, Airbus had begun studies into derivatives of the Airbus A300B in support of this long-term goal. Prior to the service introduction of the first Airbus airliners, Airbus had identified nine possible variations of the A300 known as A300B1 to B9. A tenth variation, conceived in 1973, later the first to be constructed, was designated the A300B10. It was a smaller aircraft that would be developed into the long-range Airbus A310. Airbus then focused its efforts on the single-aisle market, which resulted in the Airbus A320 family, which was the first digital fly-by-wire commercial aircraft. The decision to work on the A320, instead of a four-engine aircraft proposed by the Germans, created divisions within Airbus. As the SA or "single aisle" studies (which later became the successful Airbus A320) underwent development to challenge the successful Boeing 737 and Douglas DC-9 in the single-aisle, narrow-body airliner market, Airbus turned its focus back to the wide-body aircraft market.

The A300B11, a derivative of the A310, was designed upon the availability of "ten ton" thrust engines. Using four engines, it would seat between 180 and 200 passengers, and have a range of 6,000 nautical miles (11,000 km; 6,900 mi). It was deemed a replacement for the less-efficient Boeing 707s and Douglas DC-8s still in service. The A300B11 was joined by another design, the A300B9, which was a larger derivative of the A300. The B9 was developed by Airbus from the early 1970s at a slow pace until the early 1980s. It was essentially a stretched A300 with the same wing, coupled with the most powerful turbofan engine available at the time. It was targeted at the growing demand for high-capacity, medium-range, transcontinental trunk routes. The B9 offered the same range and payload as the McDonnell Douglas DC-10, but it used between 25% and 38% less fuel. The B9 was therefore considered a replacement for the DC-10 and the Lockheed L-1011 Tristar.

To differentiate the programme from the SA studies, the B9 and B11 were redesignated the TA9 and TA11 (SA standing for "single aisle" and TA standing for "twin aisle"). In an effort to save development costs, it was decided that the two would share the same wing and airframe; the projected savings were estimated at US$500 million (about £490 million or €495 million). The adoption of a common wing structure also had one technical advantage: the TA11's outboard engines could counteract the weight of the longer-range model by providing bending relief. Another factor was the split preference of those within Airbus and, more importantly, prospective airliner customers. Airbus vice president for strategic planning, Adam Brown, recalled,

North American operators were clearly in favour of a twin[jet], while Asians wanted a quad[jet]. In Europe, opinion was split between the two. The majority of potential customers were in favour of a quad despite the fact, in certain conditions, it is more costly to operate than a twin. They liked that it could be ferried with one engine out, and could fly 'anywhere'— ETOPS (extend-range twin-engine operations) hadn't begun then.

=== Design effort ===
The first specifications of the TA9 and TA11 were released in 1982. While the TA9 had a range of 3,300 nautical miles (6,100 km; 3,800 mi), the TA11 range was up to 6,830 nautical miles (12,650 km; 7,860 mi). At the same time, Airbus also sketched the TA12, a twin-engine derivative of the TA11, which was optimised for flights of a 2,000 nautical miles (3,700 km; 2,300 mi) lesser range. By the time of the Paris Air Show in June 1985, more refinements had been made to the TA9 and TA11, including the adoption of the A320 flight deck, fly-by-wire (FBW) flight control system and side-stick control. Adopting a common cockpit across the new Airbus series allowed operators to make significant cost savings; flight crews would be able to transition from one to another after one week of training. The TA11 and TA12 would use the front and rear fuselage sections of the A310. Components were modular and also interchangeable with other Airbus aircraft where possible to reduce production, maintenance, and operating costs.

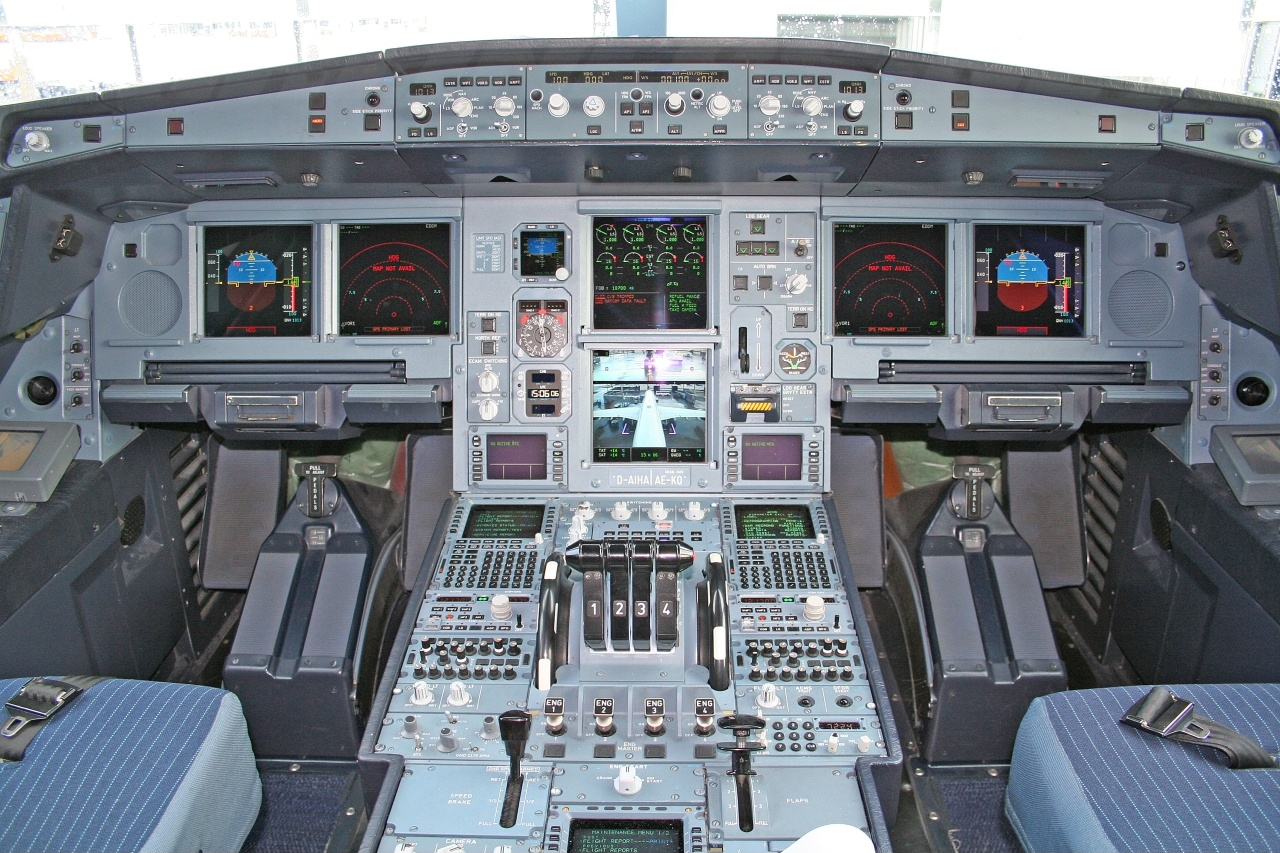
The A330/A340 shares a common flight deck with the A320.

Airbus briefly considered a variable camber wing; the concept was that the wing could change its profile to produce the optimum shape for a given phase of flight. Studies were carried out by British Aerospace (BAe) at Hatfield and Bristol. Airbus estimated this would yield a 2% improvement in aerodynamic efficiency. However, the plan was later abandoned on grounds of cost and difficulty of development.

Airbus had held discussions with McDonnell Douglas to jointly produce the aircraft, which would have been designated as the AM 300. This aeroplane would have combined the wing of the A330 with the fuselage of the McDonnell Douglas MD-11. However, talks were terminated as McDonnell Douglas insisted on the continuation of its trijet heritage. Although from the start it was intended that the A340 would be powered by four CFM56-5 turbofans, each capable of 110 kilonewtons (25,000 lbf), Airbus had also considered developing the aircraft as a trijet due to the limited power of engines available at the time, namely the Rolls-Royce RB211-535 and Pratt & Whitney JT10D-232 (redesignated PW2000 in December 1980).

As refinements in the A340's design proceeded, a radical new engine option, the IAE SuperFan, was offered by International Aero Engines, a group comprising Rolls-Royce, Pratt & Whitney, Japanese Aero Engines Corporation, Fiat and MTU Aero Engines (MTU). The engine nacelles of the superfan engine consisted of provisions to allow a large fan near the rear of the engine. As a result of the superfan cancellation by IAE, the CFM56-5C4 was used as the sole engine choice instead of being an alternative option as originally envisioned. The later, longer-range versions, namely the A340-500 and −600, are powered by Rolls-Royce Trent 500 engines.

On 27 January 1986, the Airbus Industrie Supervisory Board held a meeting in Munich, West Germany, after which board chairman Franz Josef Strauß released a statement,

Airbus Industrie is now in a position to finalise the detailed technical definition of the TA9, which is now officially designated the A330, and the TA11, now called the A340, with potential launch customer airlines, and to discuss with them the terms and conditions for launch commitments.

The designations were originally reversed and were switched so the quad-jet airliner would have a "4" in its name. On 12 May 1986, Airbus dispatched fresh sale proposals to five prospective airlines including Lufthansa and Swissair.

=== Production and testing ===
In preparations for production of the A330/A340, Airbus's partners invested heavily in new facilities. Filton was the site of BAe's £7 million investment in a three-storey technical centre with an extra 15,000 square metres (160,000 sq ft) of floor area. BAe also spent £5 million expanding the Broughton wing production plant by 14,000 m^{2} (150,000 sq ft) to accommodate a new production line. However, France saw the biggest changes with Aérospatiale starting construction of a new Fr.2.5 billion ($411 million) assembly plant, adjacent to Toulouse-Blagnac Airport, in Colomiers. By November 1988, the first 21 m (69 ft) pillars were erected for the new Clément Ader assembly hall. The assembly process, meanwhile, would feature increased automation with holes for the wing-fuselage mating process drilled by eight robots. The use of automation for this particular process saved Airbus 20% on labour costs and 5% on time.

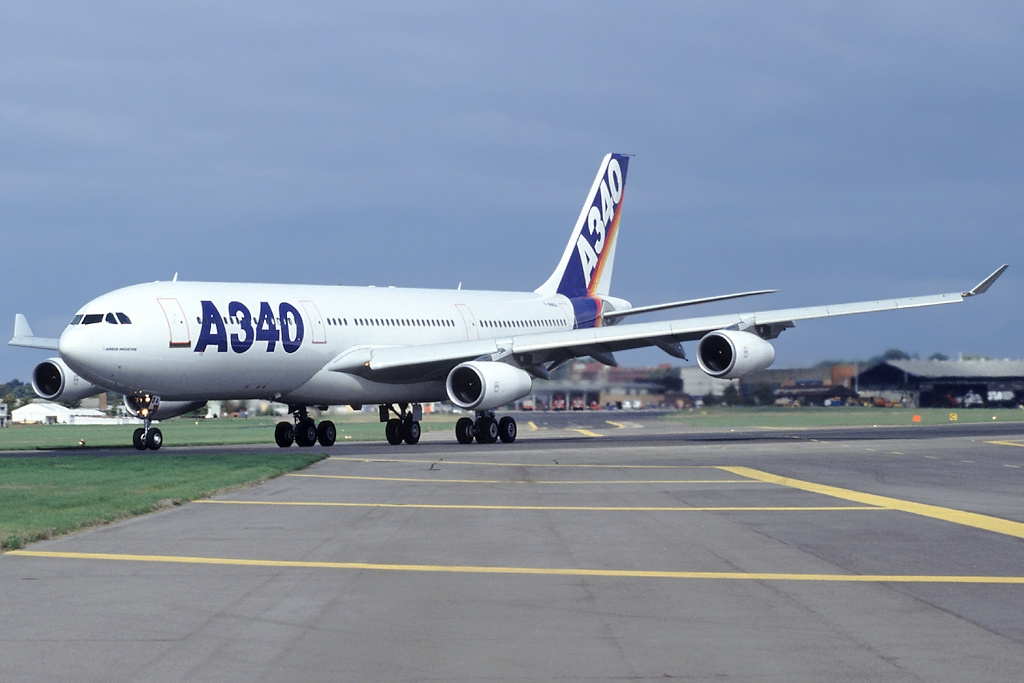
An A340-200 demonstrator at the 1992 Farnborough Air Show

British Aerospace accepted £450 million funding from the UK government, short of the £750 million originally requested. Funds from the French and West German governments followed thereafter. Airbus also issued subcontracts to companies in Austria, Australia, Canada, China, Greece, Italy, India, Japan, South Korea, Portugal, the United States, and Yugoslavia. The A330 and A340 programmes were jointly launched on 5 June 1987, just prior to the Paris Air Show. The program cost was $3.5 billion with the A330, in 2001 dollars. The order book then stood at 130 aircraft from 10 customers, apart from the above-mentioned Lufthansa and International Lease Finance Corporation (ILFC). Eighty-nine of the total orders were A340 models. At McDonnell Douglas, ongoing tests of the MD-11 revealed a significant shortfall in the aircraft's performance. An important carrier, Singapore Airlines (SIA), required a fully laden aircraft that could fly from Singapore to Paris, against strong headwinds during mid-winter in the northern hemisphere. The MD-11, according to test results, would experience fuel starvation over the Balkans. Due to the less-than-expected performance figures, SIA cancelled its 20-aircraft MD-11 order on 2 August 1991, and ordered 20 A340-300s instead.

The first flight of the A340 occurred on 25 October 1991, marking the start of a 2,000-hour test flight programme involving six aircraft. From the start, engineers noticed that the wings were not stiff enough to carry the outboard engines at cruising speed without warping and fluttering. To alleviate this, an underwing bulge called a plastron was developed to correct airflow problems around the engine pylons and to add stiffness. European JAA certification was obtained on 22 December 1992; the FAA followed on 27 May 1993. In 1992, the unit cost of an A340-200 was US$105M and US$110M for an A340-300. (equivalent to $216 million in 2025 dollars).

=== Entry into service and demonstration ===
The first A340, a −200, was delivered to Lufthansa on 2 February 1993 and entered service on 15 March. The 228-seat airliner was named Nürnberg. The first A340-300, the 1000th Airbus, was delivered to Air France on 26 February, the first of nine it planned to operate by the end of the year. Air France replaced its Boeing 747s with A340s on its Paris–Washington D.C. route, flying four times weekly. Lufthansa intended to replace aging DC-10s with the A340s on Frankfurt–New York services.

On 16 June 1993, an A340-200 dubbed the World Ranger flew from the Paris Air Show to Auckland, New Zealand in 21 hours 32 minutes and back in 21 hours 46 minutes after a five-hour stop; this was the first non-stop flight between Europe and New Zealand and the longest non-stop flight by an airliner at the time. The 19,277 km (10,409 nmi; 11,978 mi) flight from Paris to Auckland broke six world records with 22 persons and five center tanks. Taking off at 11:58 local time, it arrived back in Paris 48 hours and 22 minutes later, at 12:20. This record held until 1997 when a Boeing 777-200ER flew 20,044 km (10,823 nmi; 12,455 mi) from Seattle to Kuala Lumpur.

=== Stretch: -500/-600 variants ===
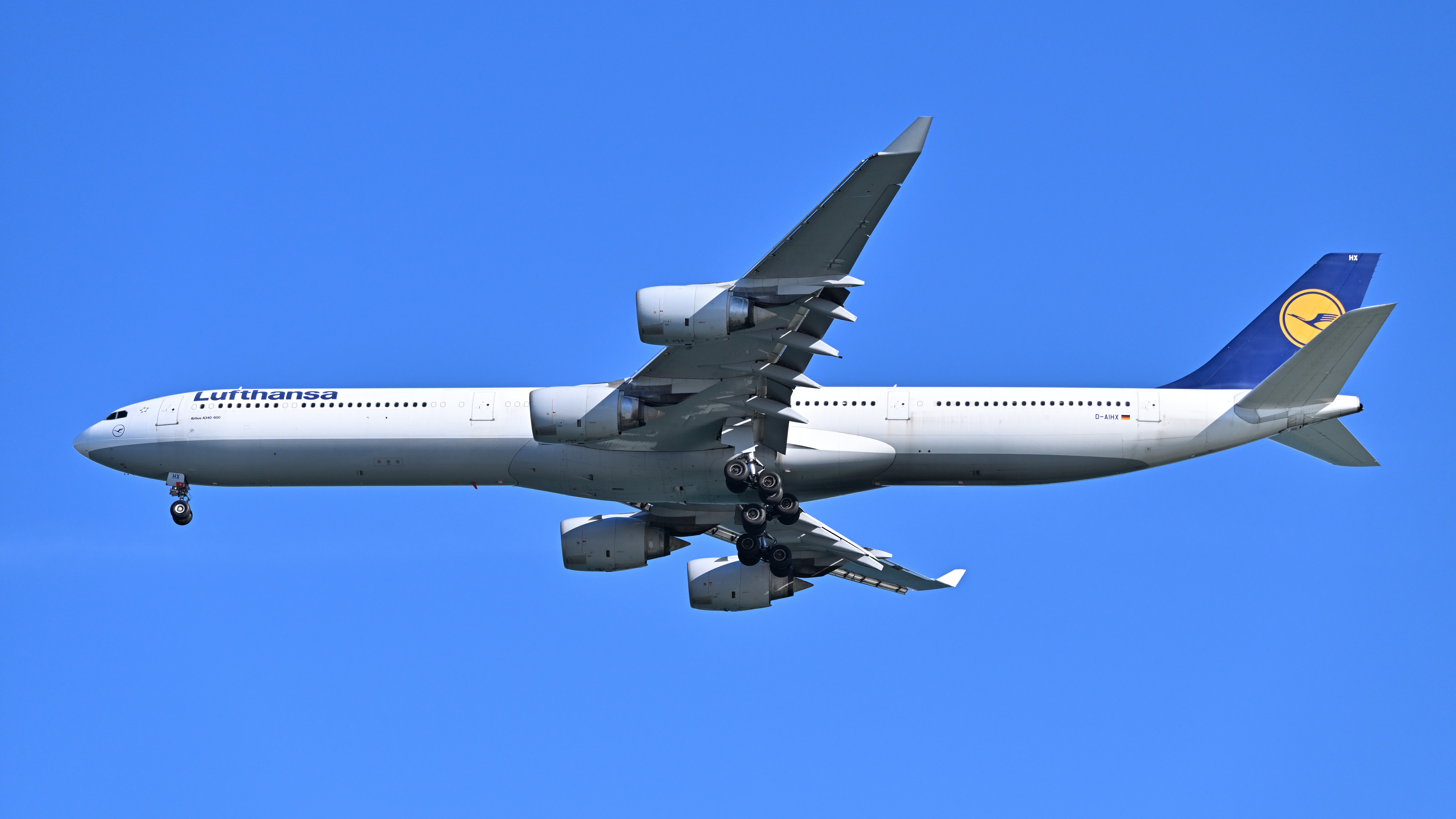
The A340-600 was the longest passenger airliner until the introduction of the Boeing 747-8 in 2010.

During the 1990s, neither the Airbus A340 nor the McDonnell Douglas MD-11 attained much success, as a total of 200 MD-11s and 246 A340 (of the original -200 and -300 variants) were sold. Both types were outpaced in sales by the Boeing 777, whose twinjet configuration was more fuel-efficient for high capacity long-haul routes, as airlines ordered 570 Boeing 777s (the -200, -200ER, and -300 variants); in particular the extended range 777-200ER proved popular as it eliminated the range advantage formerly held by the A340 and MD-11. In 1996, McDonnell Douglas proposed but never developed two MD-11 derivatives, a MD-XX Stretch which had a longer fuselage than the MD-11 to accommodate a typical three-class seating of 375, and the MD-XX LR which had a longer range and be the same length as the MD-11 with a typical three-class seating of 309. Boeing acquired McDonnell Douglas in 1997, inheriting the MD-11 program which was terminated in 2000 after fulfilling existing orders.

Meanwhile, Airbus decided to continue the A340 program so they investigated a stretched airframe in the form of the A340-400X, since airlines were looking for replacement aircraft for their 1970s-era Boeing 747-100s and -200s. Formulated in 1991, the original A340-400X concept was a simple 12-frame, 20 ft 10 in (6.35 m) stretch of the −300 from 295 to 335 passengers with the MTOW increased to 553,360 to 588,600 lb (251 to 267 t) and the range decreased by 1,390 to 10,930 km (750 to 5,900 nmi). CFM International was then set to develop a new engine for $1–1.5 billion that generated a thrust rating between the 150 kN (34,000 lbf) CFM56 and the 315–400 kN (70–90,000 lbf) GE90. In 1994, Airbus was studying a heavier A340 Advanced with a reinforced wing and a selection of 178 kN (40,000 lbf) engines; these included the Pratt & Whitney advanced ducted propulsor, CFM International CFMXX or Rolls-Royce RB411, to a −300 stretch for 50 more passengers over the same range, a −300 with the −200 range and a −200 with more range. These models were slated to be introduced in 1996. In 1995, the A340-400 was slated for introduction in the year 2000, seating 380 passengers with a 300 t (660,000 lb) take-off weight. This proved unpopular with customers, as the CFM56 engines were at the limits of their growth capability and the range would have decreased to around 10,000 km (5,400 nmi). A new plan to develop an A340 variant with a larger wing and engine combination was decided upon.

In April 1996, GE Aviation obtained an exclusivity for the 13,000 km (7,000 nmi; 8,100 mi) 375-passenger −600 stretch with 226 kN (51,000 lbf) engines, above the 225.5 kN (50,700 lbf) limit of the CFM International engines made in partnership with SNECMA and dropping the 191 kN (43,000 lbf) CFMXX. The −600 would be stretched by 20–22 frames to 75 m (246 ft), unit thrust was raised from 227 kN (51,000 lbf) to 249 kN (56,000 lbf) and maximum takeoff weight would be increased to 330 t (730,000 lb). The wing area would increase by 56 m^{2} (600 sq ft) to 420 m^{2} (4,500 sq ft) through a larger chord needing a three-frame center fuselage insert and retaining the existing front and rear spars, and a span increased by 3.5 to 63.8 m (11 to 209 ft), alongside a 25% increase in wing fuel capacity and four wheels replacing the center twin-wheel bogie. A −500 with the larger wing and engines and three extra frames for 310 passengers would cover 15,725 km (9,770 mi; 8,490 nmi) to replace the smaller 14,800 km (9,200 mi; 8,000 nmi) range of the A340-200. At least $1 billion would be needed to develop the airframe, excluding the $2 billion required for engine development supported by the engine manufacturer. A 12 frame −400 simple stretch would cover 11,290 km (6,100 nmi; 7,020 mi) with 340 passengers in a three-class configuration.

It was enlarged by 40% to compete with the second-generation Boeing 777 (eventually released as the 777-300ER/200LR) that was in development: the wing would be expanded with a tapered wing box insert along the span extension, it would have enlarged horizontal stabilizers and the larger A330-200 fin and it would need 222–267 kN (50–60,000 lbf) of unit thrust. The ultra-long-haul 1.53 m (5.0 ft) -500 stretch would seat 316 passengers, a little more than the −300, over 15,355 km (8,290 nmi; 9,540 mi), while the 10.07 m (33.0 ft) -600 stretch would offer a 25% larger cabin for 372 passengers over a range of 13,700 km (7,400 nmi; 8,500 mi). MTOW was increased to 356 t (785,000 lb).

Unwilling to commit to a $1 billion development without good return on investment prospects and a second application, in 1997 GE Aviation stopped exclusivity talks for GE90 scaled down to 245–290 kN (55–65,000 lbf), leaving Rolls-Royce proposing a more cost-effective Rolls-Royce Trent variant needing less development and Pratt & Whitney suggesting a PW2000 advanced ducted propulsor, a PW4000 derivative or a new geared turbofan. In June 1997, the 250 kN (56,000 lbf) Rolls-Royce Trent 500 was selected, with growth potential to 275 kN (62,000 lbf), derived from the Rolls-Royce Trent 700 for the Airbus A330 and the Rolls-Royce Trent 800 for the Boeing 777-200/-200ER/-300, with a reduced fan diameter and a new LP turbine for a 7.7% lower TSFC than the 700. Airbus claims 10% lower operating costs per seat than the −300, 3% below those of what Boeing was then advertising for the 777-300X. The $2.9 billion program was launched in December 1997 with 100 commitments from seven customers worth $3 billion, aiming to fly the first −600 in January 2001 and deliver it from early 2002 to capture at least half of the 1,500 sales forecast in the category through 2010.

In 1998, the −600 stretch was stabilised at 20 frames for 10.6 m (35 ft), the MTOW rose to 365 t (805,000 lb) and the unit thrust to 52,000 to 60,000 lbf (230 to 270 kN), keeping the Trent 700 2.47 m (8.1 ft) fan diameter with its scaled IP and HP compressors and the high-speed, low-loading HP and IP turbines of the Trent 800.

A340 stretch concepts
Period	1991	1994	1995	1996	1998
Unit thrust		178 kN (40,000 lbf)		267 kN (60,000 lbf)	267 kN (60,000 lbf)
Stretch	12 frames (40 pax)	50 pax		20–22 frames, 10.07 m (33.0 ft)	20 frames, 10.6 m (35 ft)
Passengers	335		380	375	380
Range	10,900 km (5,900 nmi; 6,800 mi)	same as −300		13,700 km (7,400 nmi; 8,500 mi)	13,900 km (7,500 nmi; 8,600 mi)
MTOW	267.0 t (588,600 lb)		300 t (660,000 lb)	356 t (785,000 lb)	365 t (805,000 lb)

In January 2006, Airbus confirmed it had studied an A340-600E (Enhanced) that was more fuel-efficient than earlier A340s, reducing the per-seat fuel consumption by 8–9% compared to the −600. This model would become more competitive with the Boeing 777-300ER by utilizing new Trent 1500 engines and technologies from the A350 initial design.

=== End of production ===
Although the A340−500/-600 attempted to compete in the long-range 300–400 seat market, the type was outsold by the Boeing 777-200LR/-300ER (the second generation variants of the 777 family), with 838 of the 777-300ER being ordered compared to 97 examples of the A340-600. The 777-300ER proved to be a successful evolution from first-generation 777s thanks to the basic design being optimized for larger variants paired up with development of higher-thrust GE90 engines, by contrast the substantial reworking of the wing and fuselage from the A340-300 resulted in the A340-600 being overweight and inefficient. The A340-500IGW/600HGW high gross weight variants did not arouse much sales interest. In 2005, 155 Boeing 777s were ordered against 15 Airbus A340s: twin engine ETOPS restrictions were overcome by lower operating costs compared to quad jets and the relaxation of ETOPS requirements for the 777 and other twinjets. Nonetheless, Airbus predicted in 2007 that another 127 A340 aircraft would likely be produced through 2016, the projected end of production.

On 10 November 2011, Airbus announced the end of the A340 program, stating that all firm orders were delivered. The decision to terminate the program came as A340-500/600 orders came to a halt, with analyst Nick Cunningham pointing out that the A340 "was too heavy and there was a big fuel burn gap between the A340 and Boeing's 777 [specifically the A340-600 against the 777-300ER]". Bertrand Grabowski, managing director of DVB Bank, noted, "in an environment where the fuel price is high, the A340 has had no chance to compete against similar twin engines, and the current lease rates and values of this aircraft reflect the deep resistance of any airlines to continue operating it". At 380 passengers, the advertised three-class seating of the A340−600 was well above the real world average of 323 seats, while the Boeing 777-300ER is advertised for 365 and offers 332, impacting seat costs. By 2018, a -600 built in 2006 was worth $18M and while a -600 built in 2003 was valued at $10M, projected to fall to $7M in 2021 with a $200,000/month lease rate falling to $180,000 in 2021; its D check cost $4.5M and its engine overhaul $3–6M.

As a sales incentive amid low customer demand during the Great Recession, Airbus had offered buy-back guarantees to airlines that chose to procure the A340. In 2011, the unit cost of an A340-300 was US$238.0M ($340.6M today), US$261.8M for an A340-500 ($374.7M today) and US$275.4M for an A340-600 ($394.2M today). By 2013, the resale value of an A340 declined by 30% over ten years, and both Airbus and Rolls-Royce were incurring related charges amounting to hundreds of millions of euros. Some analysts have expected the price of a flight-worthy, CFM56-powered A340 to drop below $10 million by 2023. A 10-year-old A340-300 had a base value of $35m and a market value of $24m, leading to $320,000/mo ($240,000–$350,000) lease rate, while a −500 is $425,000 and a −600 is leased $450,000 to $500,000 per month, versus $1.3m for a 777-300ER. The lighter A340-300 consumes 5% less fuel per trip with 300 passengers than the 312 passengers 777-200ER while the heavier A340-600 uses 12% more fuel than a 777-300ER. In 2013, as ultra-long range routes remained a niche market, the A340 became less attractive for most airlines' typical needs, with the best usage on long, thin routes from hot-and-high airports or as interim air charter.

As an effort to support the A340's resale value, Airbus has proposed reconfiguring the aircraft's interior for a single class of 475 seats. As the Trent 500 engines are half the maintenance cost of the A340, Rolls-Royce proposed a cost-reducing maintenance plan similar to the company's existing program that reduced the cost of maintaining the RB211 engine powering Iberia's Boeing 757 freighters. Key to these programs is the salvaging, repair and reuse of serviceable parts from retired older engines.

Airbus has offered used A340s to airlines wishing to retire older aircraft, such as the Boeing 747-400, claiming that the cost of purchasing and maintaining a second-hand A340 with increased seating and improved engine performance reportedly compared favourably to the procurement costs of a new Boeing 777. Airbus also offers to convert retired A340 airliners to VIP transport configuration, the ACJ340, via its subsidiary Airbus Corporate Jets.

Airbus has positioned the A350, specifically the A350-900 and A350-1000, as the successors to the A340-500 and A340-600.

== Design ==
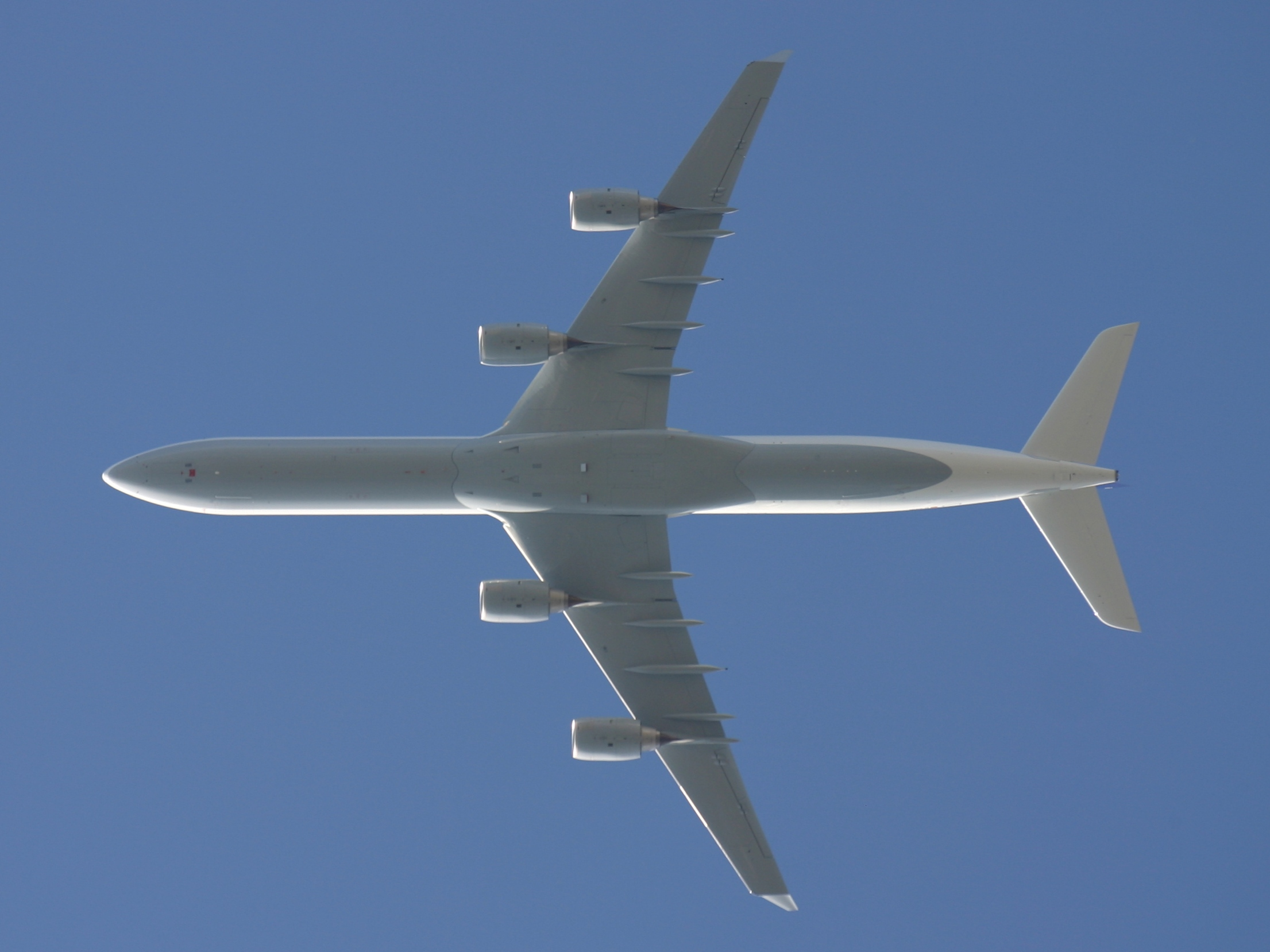
The 9.2 aspect ratio and 31° sweep of the A340-600 wing

The Airbus A340 is a twin-aisle passenger airliner that was the first long-range Airbus, powered by four turbofan jet engines. It was developed with technology from earlier Airbus aircraft and their features, like the A320 glass cockpit; it shares many components with the A330, notably identical fly-by-wire control systems and similar wings. Its features and improvements were usually shared with the A330. The four engines configuration avoided the ETOPS constraints such as more frequent inspections.

The A340 has a low cantilever wing; the A340-200/300 wing is virtually identical to that of the A330, with both engine pylons used while only the inboard one is used on the A330. The two engines for each wing provide a more distributed weight and a more outboard engine weight for a lower wing root bending moment at equal TOW, allowing a higher wing limited MTOW for more range. However, the four engines of the A340-200/300 burn more fuel than the A330-200/300. The wings were designed and manufactured by BAe, which developed a long, slender wing with a high aspect ratio for a higher aerodynamic efficiency. (Note: The higher the aspect ratio, the greater the aerodynamic efficiency: A higher aspect ratio wing has a lower drag and a slightly higher lift than a lower aspect ratio wing.)

The wing is swept back at 30 degrees, allowing a maximum operating Mach number of 0.86. To reach a long span and high aspect ratio without a significant weight penalty, the wing has a relatively high thickness-to-chord ratio of 11.8% or 12.8%. (Note: This is the thickness to chord ratio of the early Airbus A340 variants, which share the same wing with the A330) Jet airliners have thickness-to-chord ratios ranging from 9.4% (MD-11 or Boeing 747) to 13% (Avro RJ or 737 Classic). Each wing also has a 2.74 m (9.0 ft) tall winglet instead of the wingtip fences found on earlier Airbus aircraft. The failure of the ultra-high-bypass IAE SuperFan, promising around 15% better fuel burn, led to wing upgrades to compensate. Originally designed with a 56 m (184 ft) span, the wing was later extended to 58.6 m (192 ft) and finally to 60.3 m (198 ft). This wingspan is similar to that of the larger Boeing 747-200, but with 35% less wing area.

The A340 uses a modified A320 glass cockpit, with side-stick controls instead of a conventional yoke. The main instrument panel is dominated by six displays, cathode-ray tube monitors initially then liquid crystal displays. Flight information is directed via the Electronic Flight Instrument System (EFIS) and systems information through the Electronic Centralised Aircraft Monitor (ECAM).

The aircraft monitors various sensors and automatically alerts the crew to any parameters outside their normal range. Pilots can also inspect individual systems. Electronic manuals are used instead of paper ones, and web-based updates are optional. Maintenance difficulty and cost were reduced to half of that of the earlier and smaller Airbus A310. Improved engine control and monitoring improved time on the wing. The centralised maintenance computer can transmit real-time information to ground facilities via the onboard satellite-based ACARS datalink. Heavy maintenance, like structural changes, remained unchanged, while cabin enhancements, like the in-flight entertainment, were increased over preceding airliners.

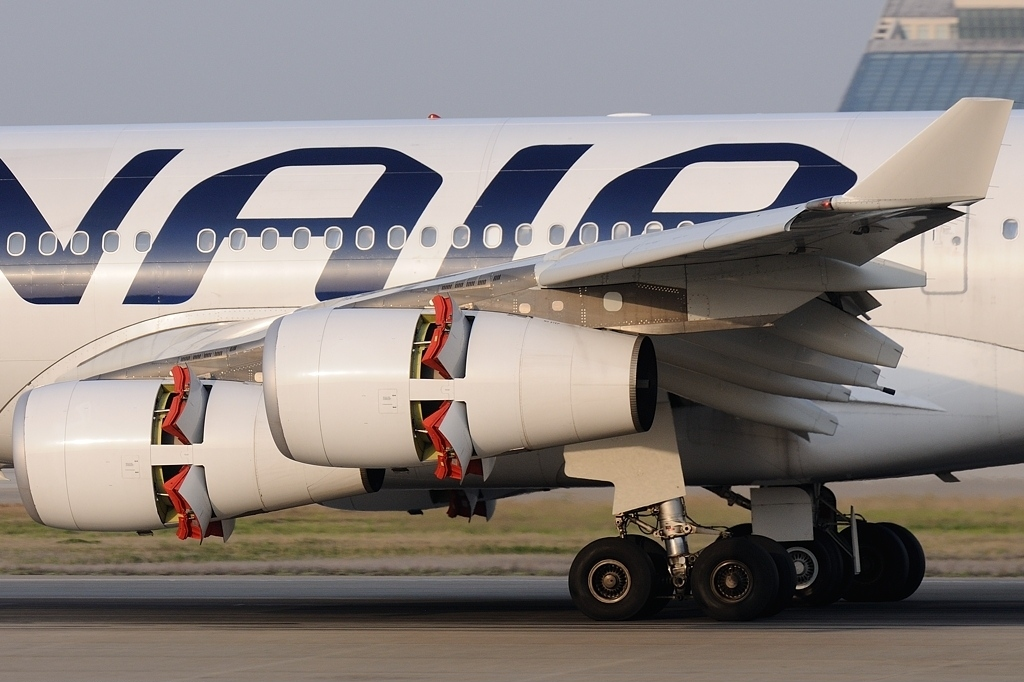
The A340-200/300 is powered by four CFM56-5Cs with exhaust mixers.

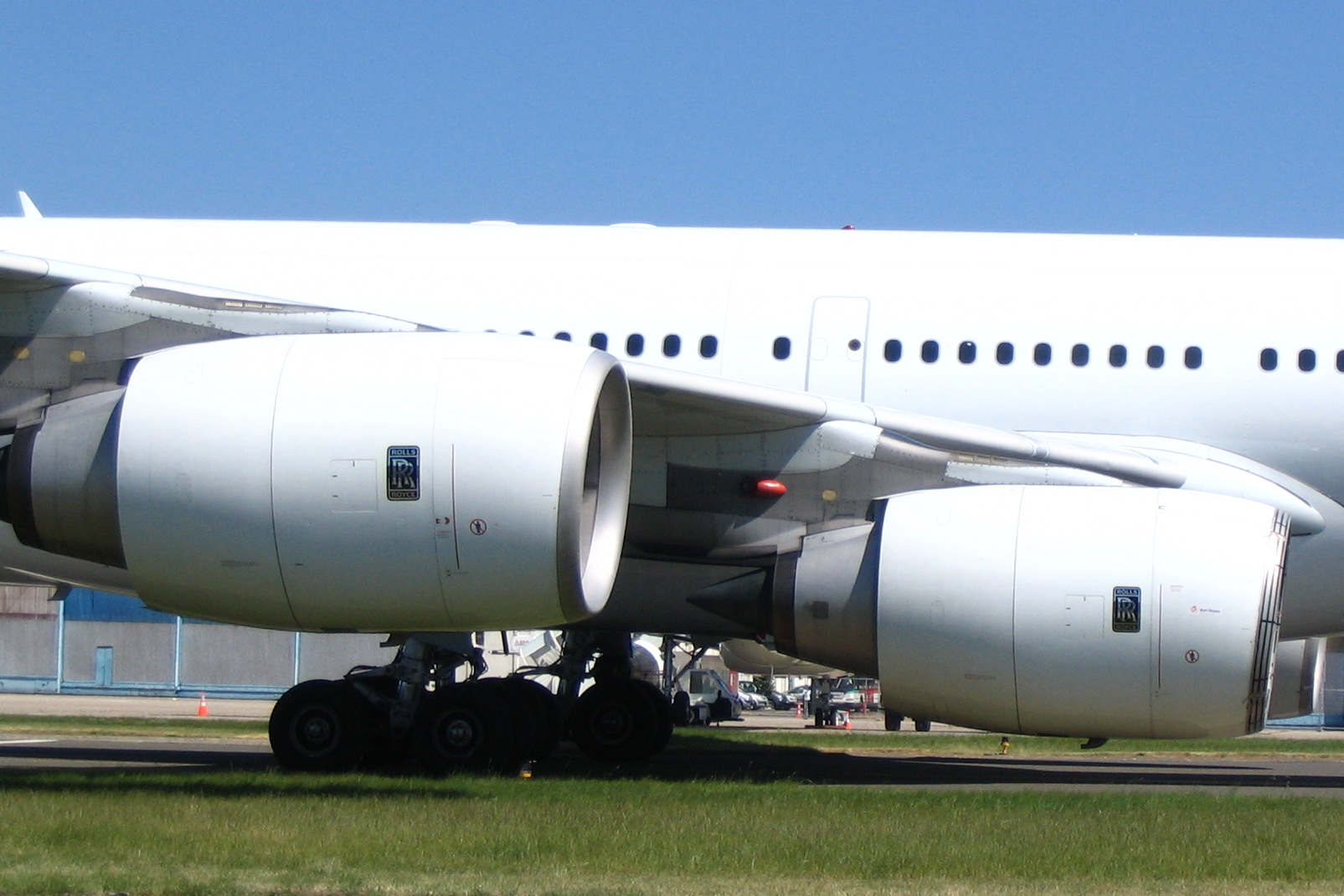
The A340-500/600 is powered by four larger Rolls-Royce Trent 500s with separate flows.

== Operational history ==
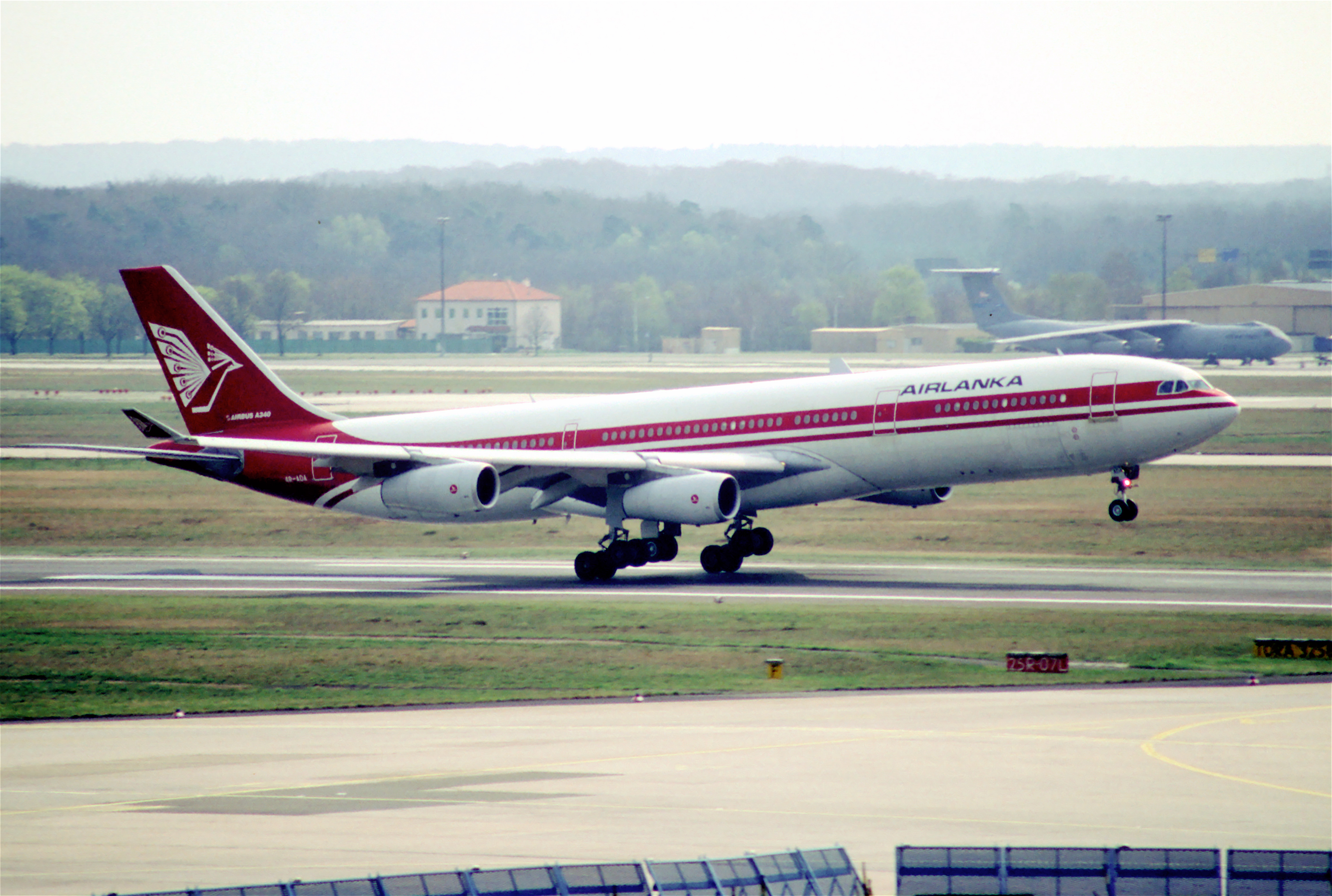
Air Lanka (now SriLankan Airlines) was the Asian launch customer of the aircraft.

The first variant of the A340 to be introduced, the A340-200, entered service with the launch customer, Lufthansa, in 1993. It was followed shortly thereafter by the A340-300 with its operator, Air France. Lufthansa's first A340, dubbed Nürnberg (D-AIBA), began revenue service on 15 March 1993. Lufthansa later selected the A340-600 over the Boeing 777-300ER for high capacity long-haul routes, due to the A340-600's commonality with their existing fleets of A340-300 and the related A330-300 which would bring training and logistical savings, although the 777-300ER as a twinjet has lower operational costs and better fuel-efficiency than the A340-600. Air Lanka (later renamed SriLankan Airlines) became the Asian launch customer of the Airbus A340; the airline received its first A340-300, registered (4R-ADA), in September 1994. British airline Virgin Atlantic was an early adopter of the A340; in addition to operating several A340-300 aircraft, Virgin Atlantic announced in August 1997 that it would be the worldwide launch customer for the new A340-600. Virgin performed the first commercial flight of the A340-600 in July 2002.

Singapore Airlines ordered 17 A340-300s and operated them until October 2003. Boeing purchased those A340-300s as part of an order for Boeing 777-200ERs in 1999. The airline then purchased five long-range A340-500s, which joined the fleet in December 2003. In February 2004, the airline's A340-500 performed the longest non-stop commercial air service worldwide, conducting a non-stop flight between Singapore and Los Angeles. In 2004, Singapore Airlines launched an even longer non-stop route using the A340-500 between Newark and Singapore, SQ 21, a 15,344 kilometres (8,285 nmi; 9,534 mi) journey that was the longest scheduled non-stop commercial flight in the world. The airline continued to operate this route regularly until the airline decided to retire the type in favour of new A380 and A350 aircraft; its last A340 flight was performed in late 2013.

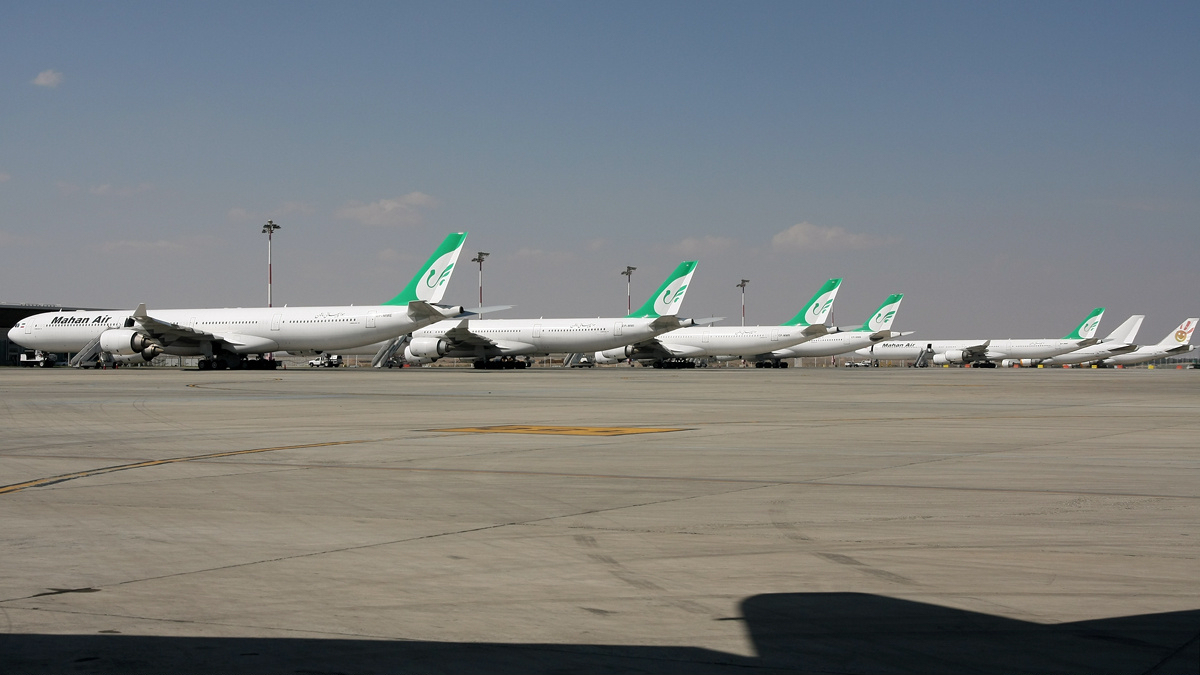
Line up of Mahan Air Airbus A340 at IKA Airport

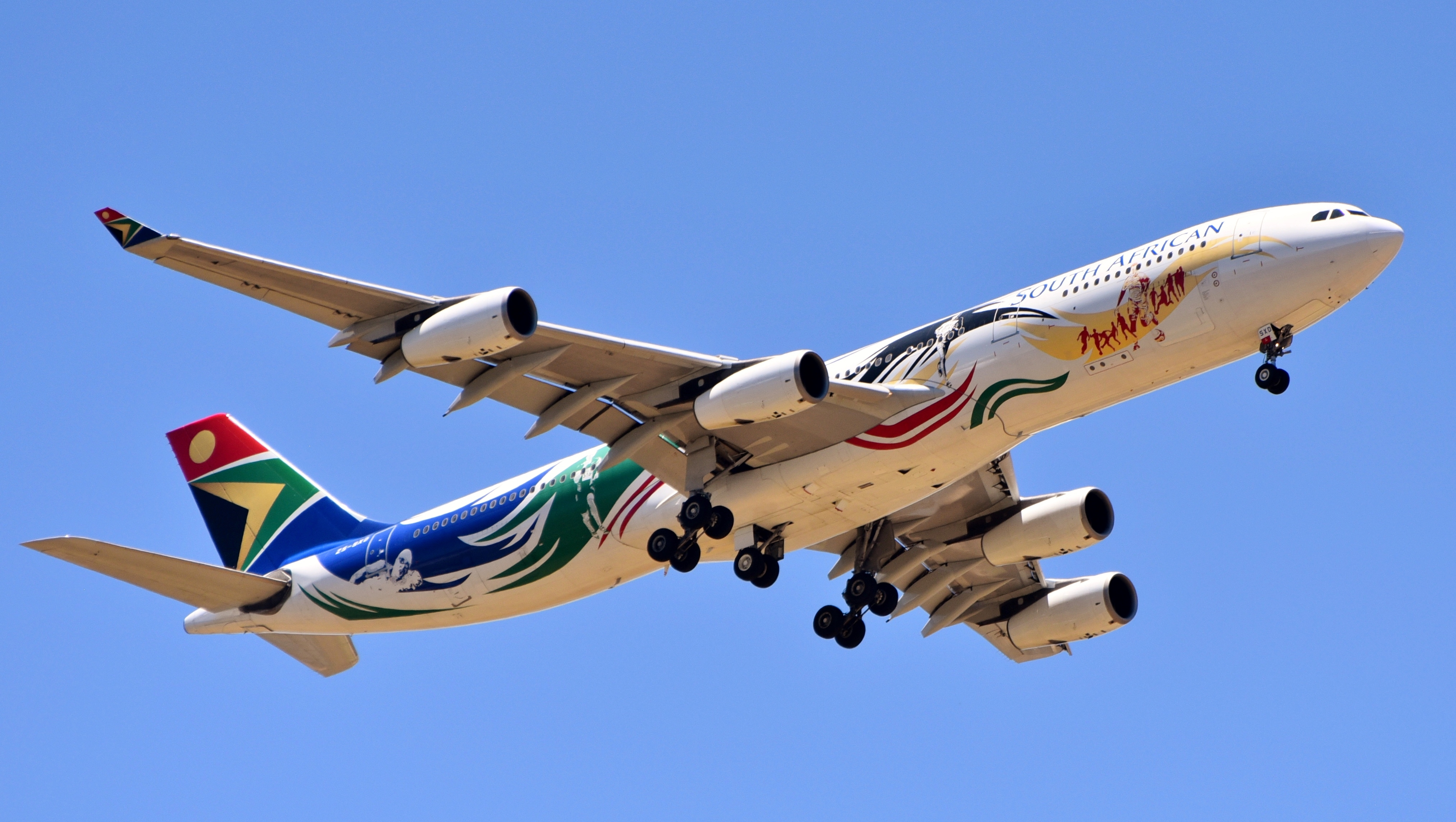
A South African Airways A340-300 with 2-wheel centre-line bogie in 2018

The A340-300 was typically used by airlines as a medium-sized long-haul aircraft, while the A340-600 was pitched as a replacement for older Boeing 747-200/300 as it was more likely to be profitable than the less efficient 747. However their primary competition, the Boeing 777-200ER and especially the 777-300ER, became the choice of airlines due to lower operating costs as a twinjet and the relaxation of ETOPS requirements. The original A340-300 also proved slow and underpowered in commercial service. A pilot remarked that "on a long flight from Hong Kong to London on the A340-300, they would often leave a lot of baggage behind when the plane was full. The Singapore flight took a long time to take off in the US – three-quarters of the full runway." The A340-200 and A340-500 were largely niche models not procured in large numbers due to their being inefficient in achieving their extreme range, as they were developed as fuselage shrinks with increased fuel capacity compared to their A340-300 and A340-600 siblings, respectively. Furthermore, operating in the specialized ultra long-haul market proved challenging, given the substantial fuel load required for such extended flights, making it a segment where profitability was hard to achieve. The A340-500's specialization for flights ranging from 15 to 18 hours limited its daily utilisation, compared to its direct rival Boeing 777-200LR which was more versatile in its deployment as a twinjet.

In 2008, jet fuel prices doubled compared to the year before; consequently, the A340's fuel consumption led airlines to reduce flight stages exceeding 15 hours. Thai Airways International cancelled its 17-hour, nonstop Bangkok–New York/JFK route on 1 July 2008, and placed its four A340-500s for sale. While short flights stress aircraft more than long flights and result in more frequent fuel-thirsty take-offs and landings, ultra-long flights require completely filled fuel tanks to ensure an adequate fuel supply upon landing. The higher weights in turn require a greater proportion of an aircraft's fuel fraction just to take off and to stay airborne. In 2008, Air France-KLM's chief executive Pierre-Henri Gourgeon disparagingly referred to the A340 as a "flying tanker with a few people on board". While Thai Airways consistently filled 80% of the seats on its New York City–Bangkok flights, it estimated that, at 2008 fuel prices, it would need an impossible 120% of seats filled just to break even. Other airlines also re-examined long-haul flights. In August 2008, Cathay Pacific issued a declaration expressing concern over the adverse impact of escalating fuel expenses on its trans-Pacific long-haul routes, emphasizing a disproportionate burden on these particular flights. Consequently, the airline outlined its strategic decision to curtail the frequency of such flights and reallocate its fleet to cater to shorter routes, notably those connecting Hong Kong and Australia. The company's primary objective, as articulated by the airline's CEO Tony Tyler, entailed a comprehensive network restructuring aimed at optimizing operational efficiency by ensuring flights were directed to destinations that would yield cost coverage and financial gain simultaneously. Aviation Week noted that rapid performance increases of twin-engine aircraft has led to the detriment of four-engine types of comparable capacity such as the A340 and 747; at this point most 747s had accumulated significant flying hours before retirement in contrast to A340s which were relatively young when grounded.

By 2014, Singapore Airlines had sold their A340-500s back to Airbus, discontinuing SQ21 and SQ22, which had been the longest non-stop scheduled flights in the world. Emirates decided to accelerate the retirement of its A340 fleet, writing down the value of the A340-500 type to zero despite the oldest −500 only being 10 years old, with president Tim Clark saying they were "designed in the late 1990s with fuel at $25–30. They fell over at $60 and at $120 they haven't got a hope in hell".

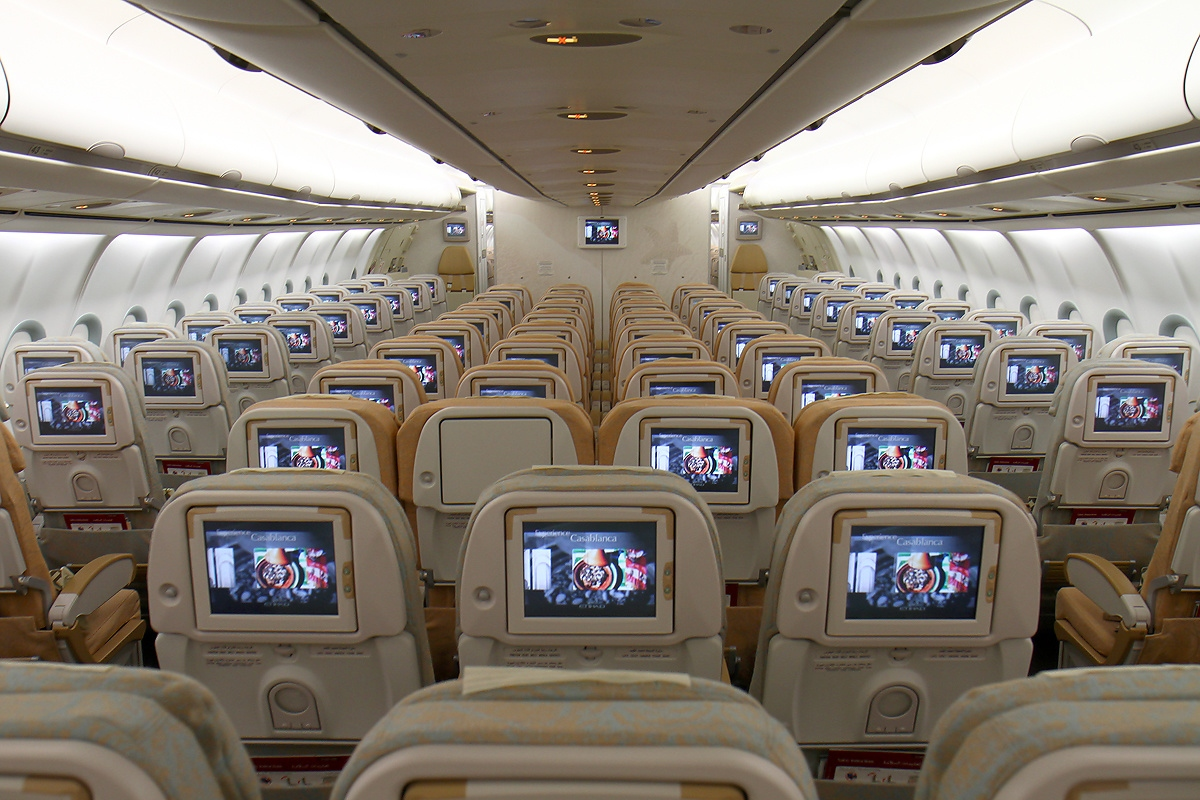
Eight-abreast, 2-4-2 economy cabin

International Airlines Group, the parent of Iberia Airlines (which is also the operator of the last production A340 built), is overhauling its A340-600s for continued service for the foreseeable future, while it is retiring its A340-300s. The IAG overhaul featured improved conditions and furnishings in the business and economy classes; the business-class capacity was raised slightly while not changing the type's overall operating cost. Lufthansa, which operated both Airbus A340-300s and −600s, concluded that, while it is not possible to make the A340 more fuel efficient, it can respond to increased interest in business-class services by replacing first-class seats with more business-class seats to increase revenue.

In January 2021, Lufthansa, which was the largest remaining operator by then, announced that their entire Airbus A340-600 fleet will be retired with immediate effect and not return to service in the wake of the COVID-19 pandemic. Ultimately, Lufthansa reactivated their A340-600s in the summer of 2022 with their final revenue flights being made on 19 October 2026, while remaining committed to operating the smaller Airbus A340-300 until 2028. The A340-600s were retired first despite being younger since they were more fuel-hungry and more expensive to fly, making them less flexible than the A340-300s. Lufthansa's A340s were already paid off by 2010 so they were no longer incurring capital costs (interest payments or lease payments) that would have had to be accounted for when buying new aircraft. Although the A340 is not as fuel-efficient as contemporary twinjets, the airline has concentrated the in-house maintenance expertise for the A340s at their hub in Frankfurt which reduces the operating costs somewhat. As Lufthansa had not procured any Boeing 777s (first or second generation variants), their existing A340s (along with other quadjets like the Boeing 747-400 and A380) have been kept in service to maintain these long-range high-capacity routes, since the newer twinjets ordered (Airbus A350, Boeing 787, and Boeing 777X) have had their deliveries held up due to delays from supply chain issues or certification. Lufthansa flies the A340s on high-volume long-haul routes which remain lucrative as their cabin configuration caters to high-value travelers.

As of December 2021, the global A340 fleet had carried over 600 million passengers and completed more than 2.5 million flights over 20 million block hours since its entry into service with 99 percent operational reliability and zero fatal accidents.

=== Government and VIP service ===
Airbus produced several A340s as large private jets for VIP customers, often to replace ageing Boeing 747s in this same role. In 2008, Airbus launched a dedicated corporate jetliner version of the A340-200: one key selling point of this aircraft was a range of up to 8,000 nautical miles (15,000 km). Airbus had built up to nine different customised versions of the A340 to satisfy private customers' specific demands before 2008.

The A340 has frequently been operated as a dedicated transport for heads of state. A pair of A340-300s were acquired from Lufthansa by the Flugbereitschaft of the German Air Force; they serve as VIP transports for the German Chancellor and other key members of the German government. The A340-200 was also operated by the air transport division of the French Air and Space Force, where it was used as a strategic transport for troop deployments and supply missions, as well as to transport government officials, until both aircraft were sold in 2020. A one-of-a-kind aircraft, the A340-8000, was originally built for Prince Jefri Bolkiah, brother of the Sultan of Brunei Hassanal Bolkiah. The aircraft was unused and stored in Hamburg until it was procured by Prince Al-Waleed bin Talal of the House of Saud, and later sold to Colonel Muammar Gaddafi, then-President of Libya; the aircraft was operated by Afriqiyah Airways and was often referred to as Afriqiyah One.

=== Other uses ===
In 2013, Snecma announced that they planned to use the A340 as a flying testbed for the development of a new open rotor engine. This test aircraft is forecast to conduct its first flight in 2019. Open rotor engines are typically more fuel-efficient but noisier than conventional turbofan engines; introducing such an engine commercially has been reported as requiring significant legislative changes within engine approval authorities due to its differences from contemporary jet engines. The engine, partly based on the Snecma M88 turbofan engine used on the Dassault Rafale, is being developed under the European Clean Sky research initiative.

== Variants ==
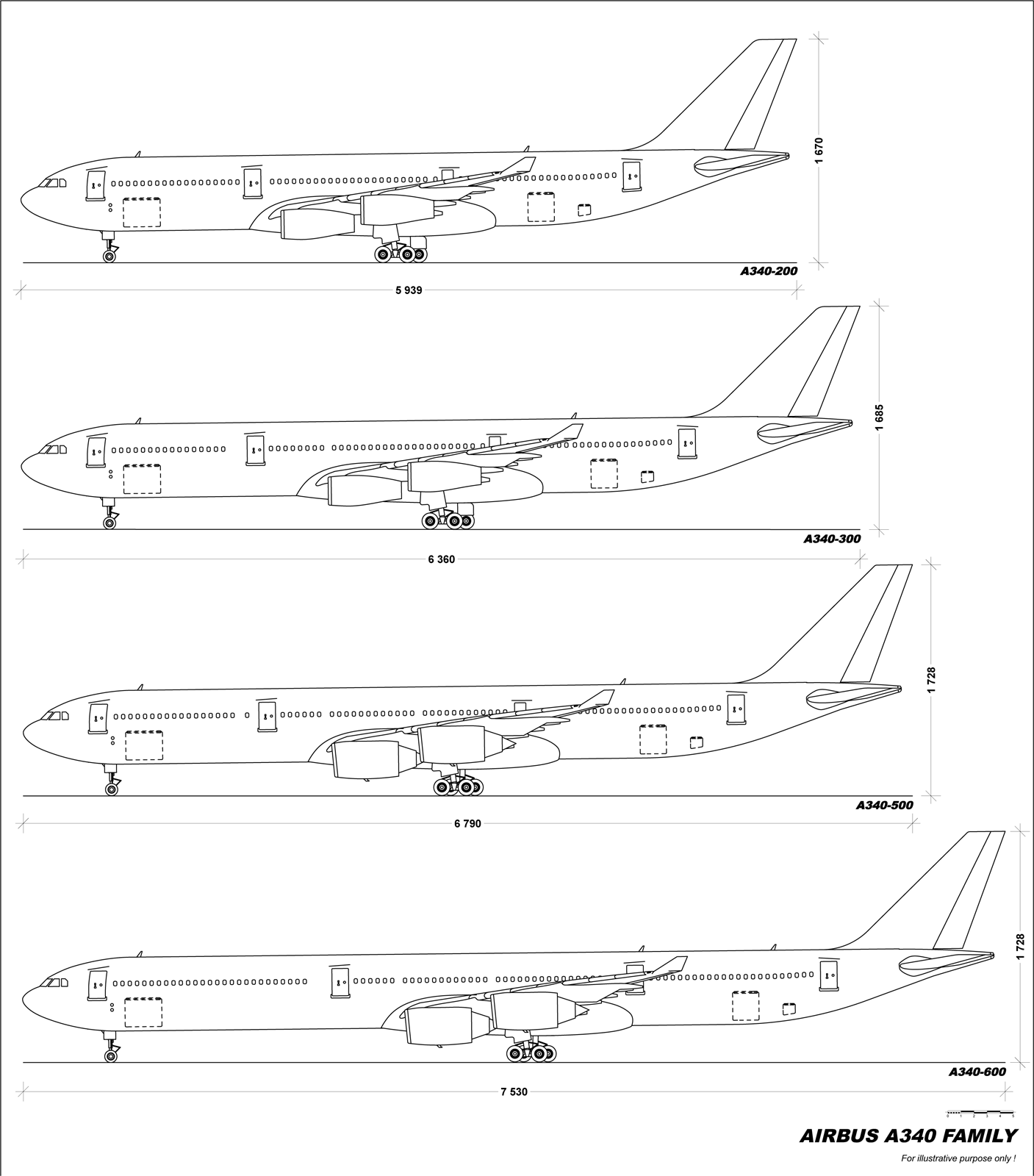
Airbus A340 family

Airbus A340 variants
ICAO code	Model(s)
A342	A340-200
A343	A340-300
A345	A340-500
A346	A340-600

There are four variants of the A340. The A340-200 and A340-300 were launched in 1987 with introduction into service in March 1993 for the −200. The A340-500 and A340-600 were launched in 1997 with introduction into service in 2002. All variants were available in a corporate version.

=== A340-200 ===
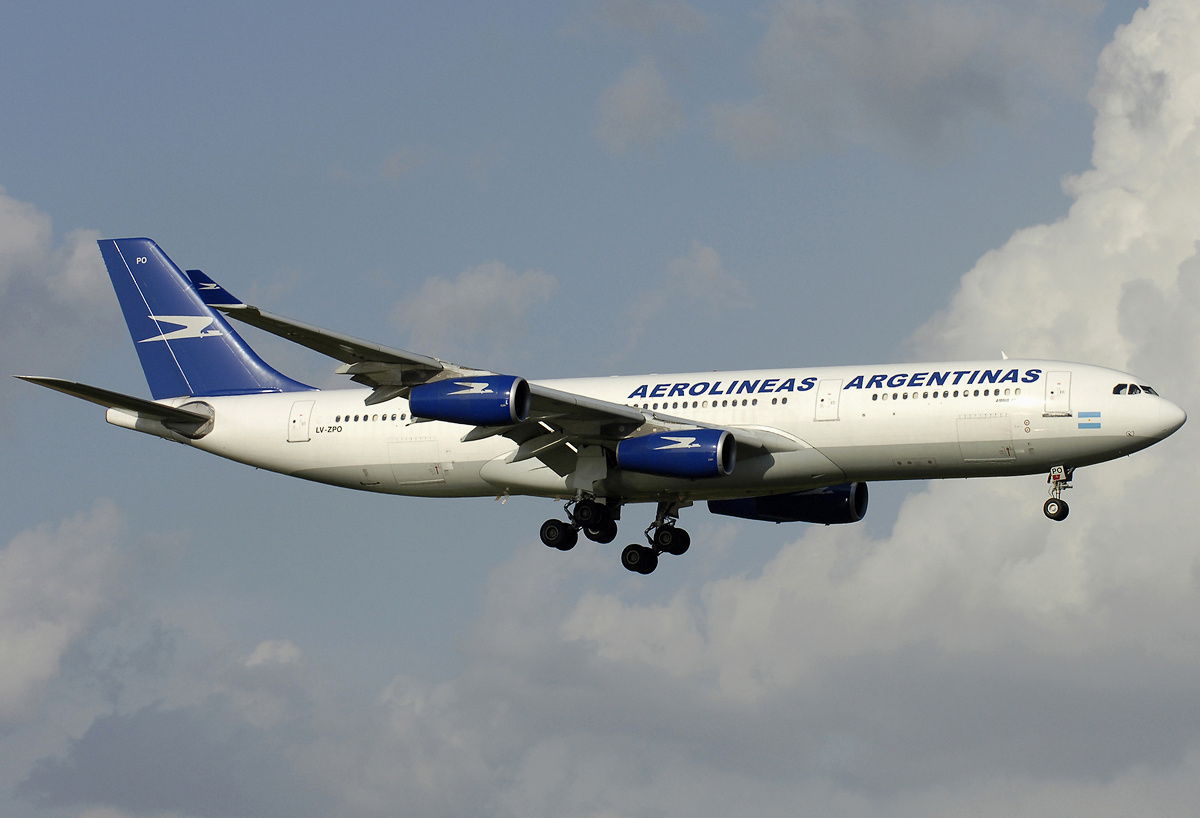
Aerolíneas Argentinas A340-200

The −200 is one of two initial versions of the A340; it has seating for 261 passengers in a three-class cabin layout with a range of 13,800 km (7,500 nmi; 8,600 mi) or seating for 240 passengers also in a three-class cabin layout for a range of 15,000 km (8,100 nmi; 9,300 mi). This is the shortest version of the family and the only version with a wingspan measuring greater than its fuselage length. It is powered by four CFMI CFM56-5C4 engines and uses the Honeywell 331–350[A] auxiliary power unit (APU). It initially entered service with Air France in May 1993. Due to its large wingspan, four engines, low capacity and general inferiority to the larger and more improved A340-300, the −200 proved very unpopular with mainstream airlines. Only 28 A340-200s were produced. Boeing did not produce a direct competitor.

One version of this type (referred to by Airbus as the A340-8000) was ordered by the prince Jefri Bolkiah, with the request for a non-stop range of 15,000 km (8,100 nmi; 9,300 mi). This A340-8000, in the Royal Brunei Airlines livery had an increased fuel capacity, an MTOW of 275 tonnes (606,000 lb), similar to the A340-300, and minor reinforcements to the undercarriage. It is powered by the 150 kilonewtons (34,000 lbf) thrust CFM56-5C4s similar to the −300E. Only one A340-8000 was produced. Besides the −8000, some A340-200s are used for VIP or military use; these include Royal Brunei Airlines, Qatar Amiri Flight, Arab Republic of Egypt Government, Royal Saudi Air Force, Jordan and the French Air and Space Force. Following the −8000, other A340-200s were later given performance improvement packages (PIPs) that helped them achieve similar gains in capability as to the A340-8000. Those aircraft are labeled A340-213X. The range for this version is 15,000 km (8,100 nmi; 9,300 mi).

=== A340-300 ===
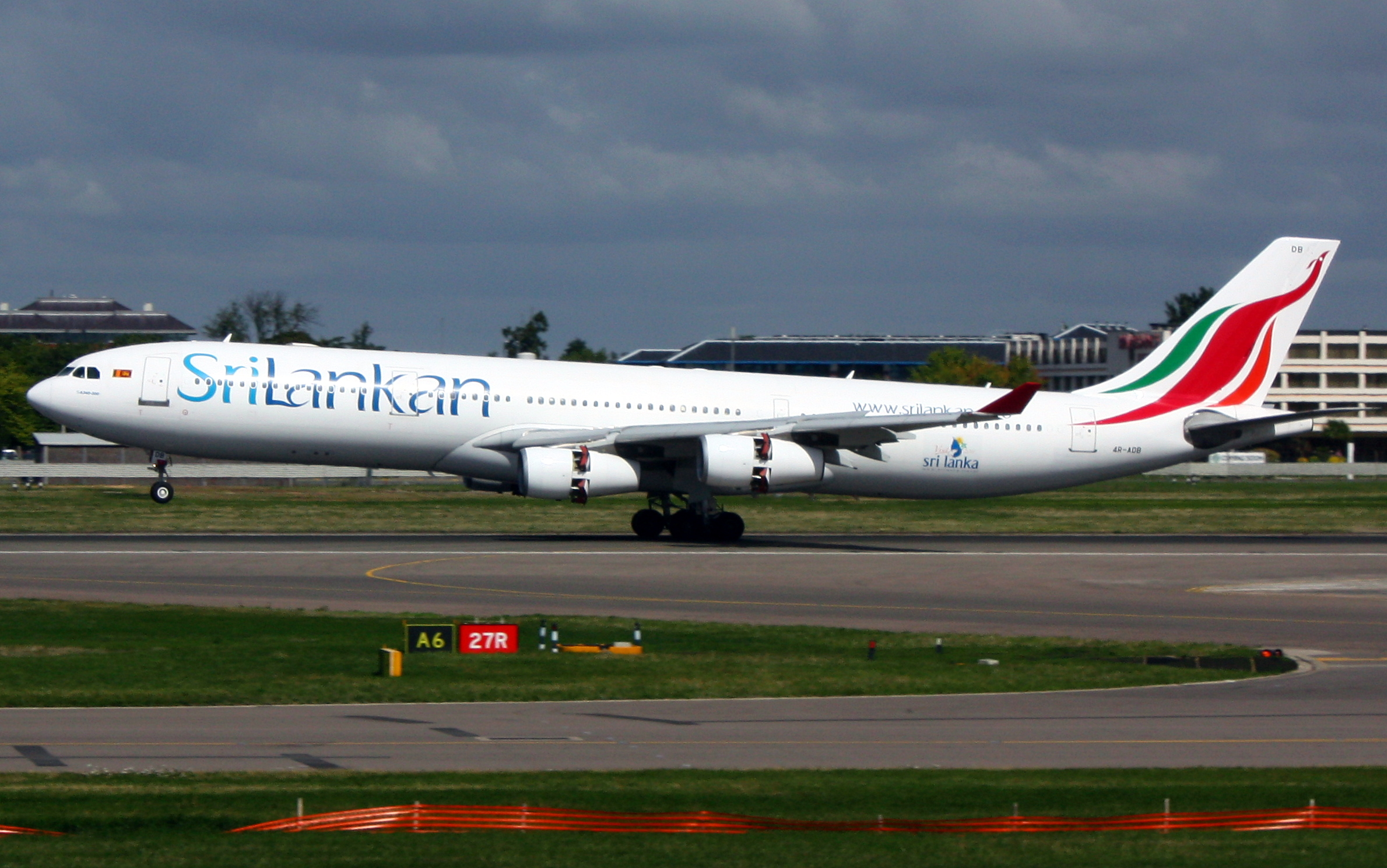
SriLankan Airlines Airbus A340-300

The A340-300 flies 295 passengers in a typical three-class cabin layout over 6,700 nautical miles (12,400 km; 7,700 mi). This is the initial version, having flown on 25 October 1991, and it entered service with Lufthansa and Air France in March 1993. It is powered by four CFMI CFM56-5C engines and uses the Honeywell 331–350[A] APU, similar to the version used on the −200. The A340-300 was superseded by the A350-900. Its closest competitor was the Boeing 777-200ER and the McDonnell Douglas MD-11. A total of 218 -300s were delivered.

The A340-300E, often mislabelled as A340-300X, has an increased MTOW of up to 275 tonnes (606,000 lb) and is powered by the more powerful 34,000 lbf (150 kN) thrust CFMI CFM56-5C4 engines. Typical range with 295 passengers is between 7,200 and 7,400 nautical miles (13,300 and 13,700 km; 8,300 and 8,500 mi). The largest operator of this type is Lufthansa, who has operated a fleet of 30 aircraft. The A340-300 Enhanced is the latest version of this model and was first delivered to South African Airways in 2003, with Air Mauritius receiving the A340-300 Enhanced into its fleet in 2006. It received newer CFM56-5C4/P engines and improved avionics and fly-by-wire systems developed for the A340-500 and −600.

=== A340-500 ===
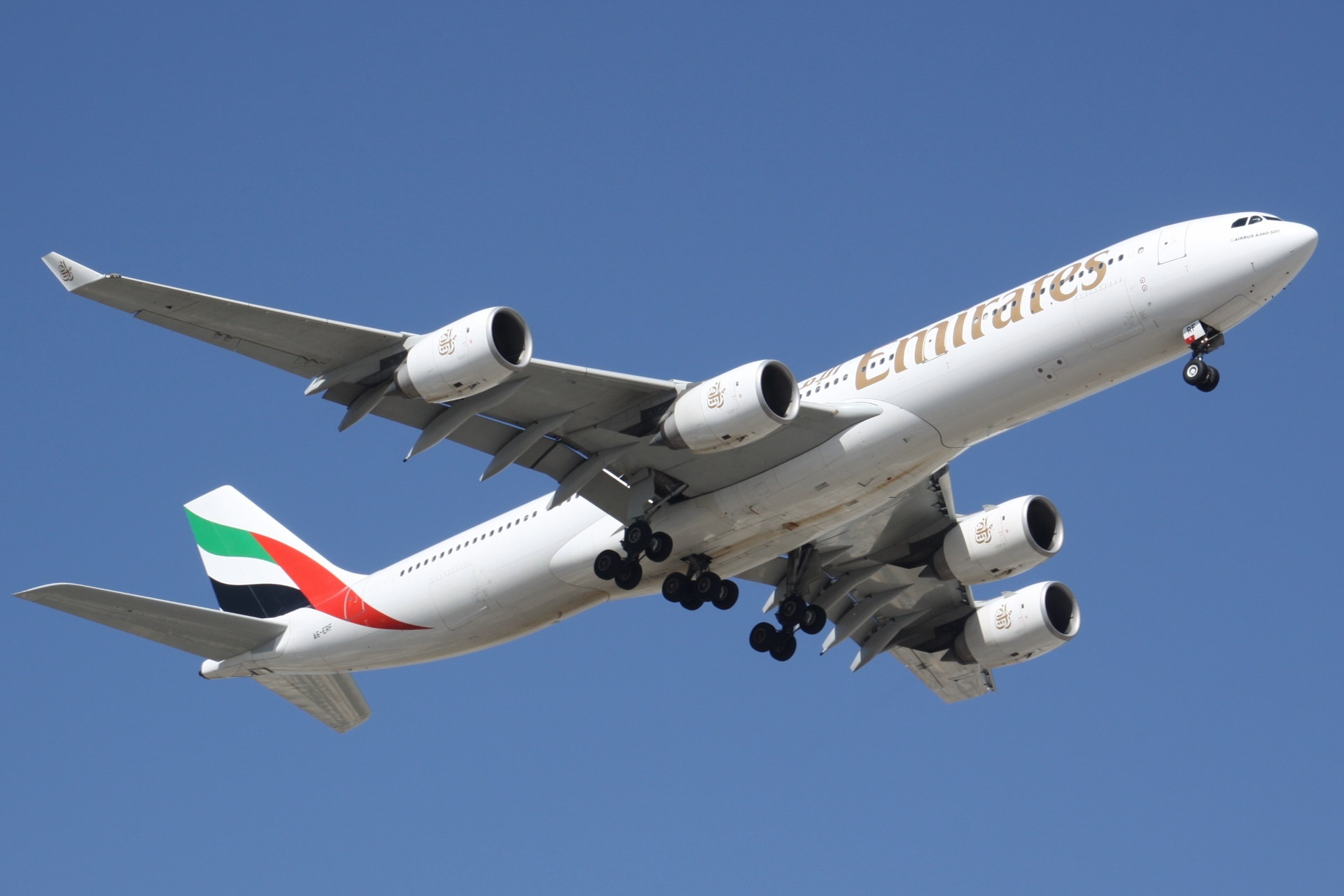
Slightly longer than the −300, the −500 has a larger wing, larger Rolls-Royce Trent 500 turbofans and three 4-wheel bogies for the main landing gear, it was introduced by Emirates in 2003.

When the A340-500 was introduced, it was the world's longest-range commercial airliner. It first flew on 11 February 2002 and was certified on 3 December 2002. Air Canada was supposed to be the launch customer but filed for bankruptcy in January 2003, delaying delivery to March. This allowed early deliveries to the new launch customer, Emirates, allowing the carrier to launch nonstop service from Dubai to New York—its first route in the Americas. The A340-500 can fly 313 passengers in a three-class cabin layout over 16,020 km (8,650 nmi; 9,950 mi)

Compared with the A340-300, the −500 features a 4.3-metre (14.1 ft) fuselage stretch, an enlarged wing, a significant increase in fuel capacity (around 50% larger than the −300), slightly higher cruising speed, a larger horizontal stabiliser and a larger vertical tailplane. The centerline main landing gear was changed to a four-wheel bogie to support the additional weight, although the -500 does not have the additional centreline landing gear (CLG) found in the longer -600. The A340-500 is powered by four 240 kN (54,000 lbf) thrust Rolls-Royce Trent 553 turbofans and uses the Honeywell 331–600[A] APU.

Designed for ultra-long-haul routes, the −500 has a range of 9,000 nmi (10,000 mi). Due to its range, the −500 is capable of travelling non-stop from London to Perth, Western Australia, though a return flight requires a fuel stop due to headwinds. Singapore Airlines used this model (initially in a two-class 181-passenger layout, later in a 100-passenger business-only layout) between early 2004 and late 2013 for its Newark–Singapore and Singapore–Newark nonstop routes SQ21 and SQ22. The former was an 18-hour, 45-minute 'westbound' (actually a polar route northbound to 130 km (70 nmi; 81 mi) across the North Pole, then south across Russia, Mongolia and the People's Republic of China) and the latter was an 18-hour, 30-minute eastbound, 15,344 km (8,285 nmi; 9,534 mi) journey. At the time, the flight was the longest-scheduled non-stop commercial flight in the world. Singapore Airlines even added a special compartment to the aircraft to store a corpse if a passenger were to die during the flight, though it was reported that its use had not been necessary. Singapore Airlines suspended operating the flight from 2013 onwards partly due to high fuel prices at that time and returned its aircraft to Airbus in exchange for ordering new Airbus A350 aircraft. The SQ21/SQ22 route was eventually resumed, flown by Airbus A350-900ULR aircraft.

The A340-500IGW (Increased Gross Weight) version has a range of 17,000 km (9,200 nmi; 11,000 mi) and a MTOW of 380 t (840,000 lb) and first flew on 13 October 2006. It uses the strengthened structure and enlarged fuel capacity of the A340-600. Nigerian airline Arik Air received a pair of A340-542s in November 2008, using the type to launch two new routes immediately Lagos–London Heathrow and Lagos–Johannesburg; a non-stop Lagos–New York route began in January 2010. The A340-500IGW is powered by four 250 kN (56,000 lbf) thrust Rolls-Royce Trent 556 turbofans.

The A340-500 proved to be unpopular with customers, with no airlines from Western Europe nor North America purchasing the type although some airlines from these continents leased the -500 for seasonal or ad hoc long haul operations. This was primarily attributed to its inefficiency in achieving its extreme range, retaining most of the heavy structural elements of its larger sibling from which it was derived, the A340-600, with the -500 having an increased fuel capacity and carrying considerably fewer passengers in a shorter fuselage. Furthermore, operating in the specialized ultra long-haul market proved challenging, given the substantial fuel load required for such extended flights, making it a segment where profitability was hard to achieve. The A340-500's specialization for flights ranging from 15 to 18 hours limited its daily utilisation, compared to its direct rival Boeing 777-200LR (itself a shrink of the 777-300ER) which has more versatile in its deployment as a twinjet.

As of May 2025, there are no longer any commercial A340-500 in service. The remaining A340-500 are currently operating private service or as government planes, such as Las Vegas Sands and Qatar Amiri Flight.

=== A340-600 ===
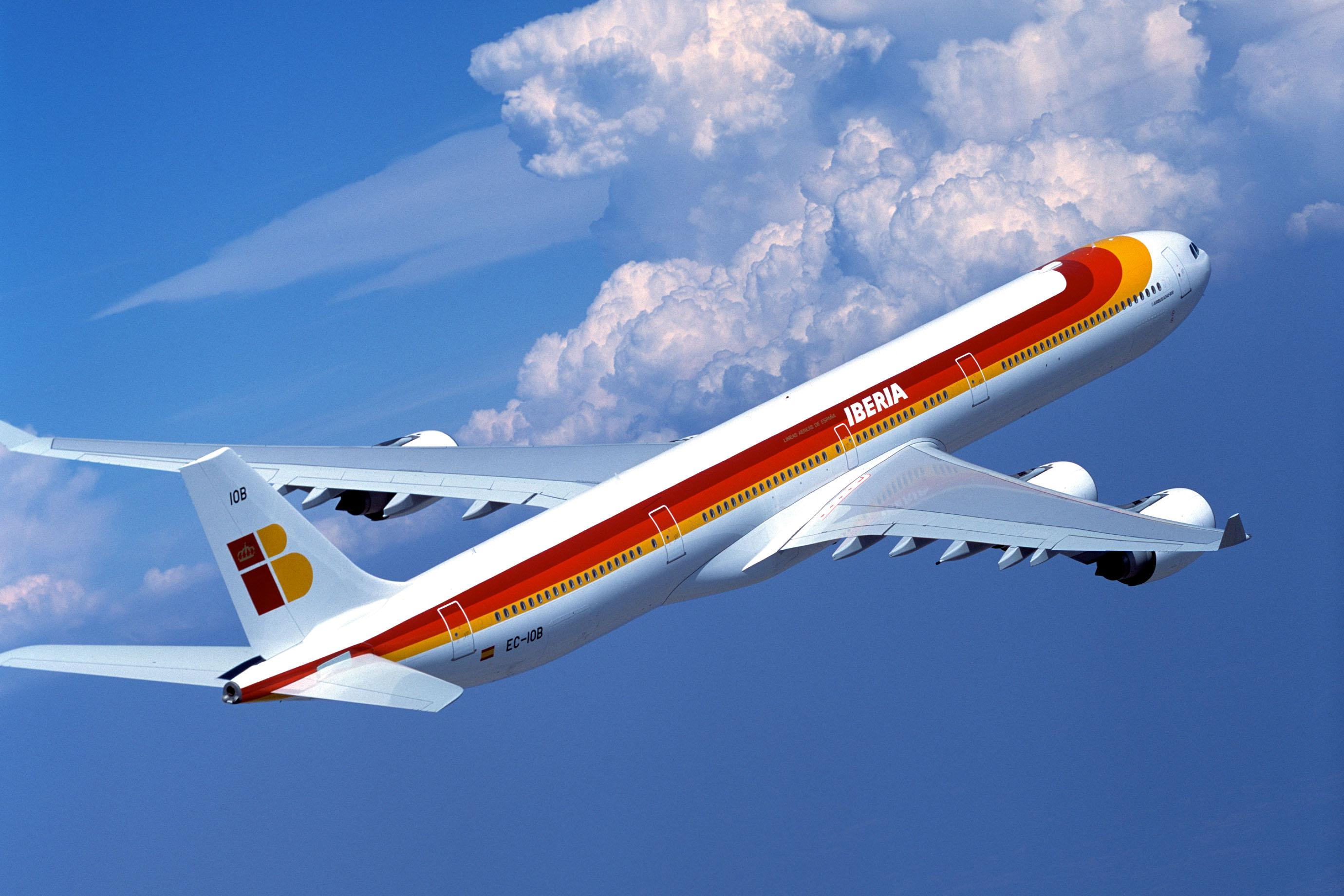
The A340-600 has five doors per side, as seen here on a since-retired Iberia aircraft.

Designed to replace early-generation Boeing 747-200/300 airliners, the A340-600 can carry 379 passengers in a three-class cabin layout for 13,900 km (7,500 nmi; 8,600 mi). It provides a passenger capacity similar to a 747 but with 25 per cent more cargo volume and lower trip and seat costs. The first flight of the A340-600 was made on 23 April 2001. Virgin Atlantic began commercial services in August 2002.

A340-600 and A340-200 cockpit comparison
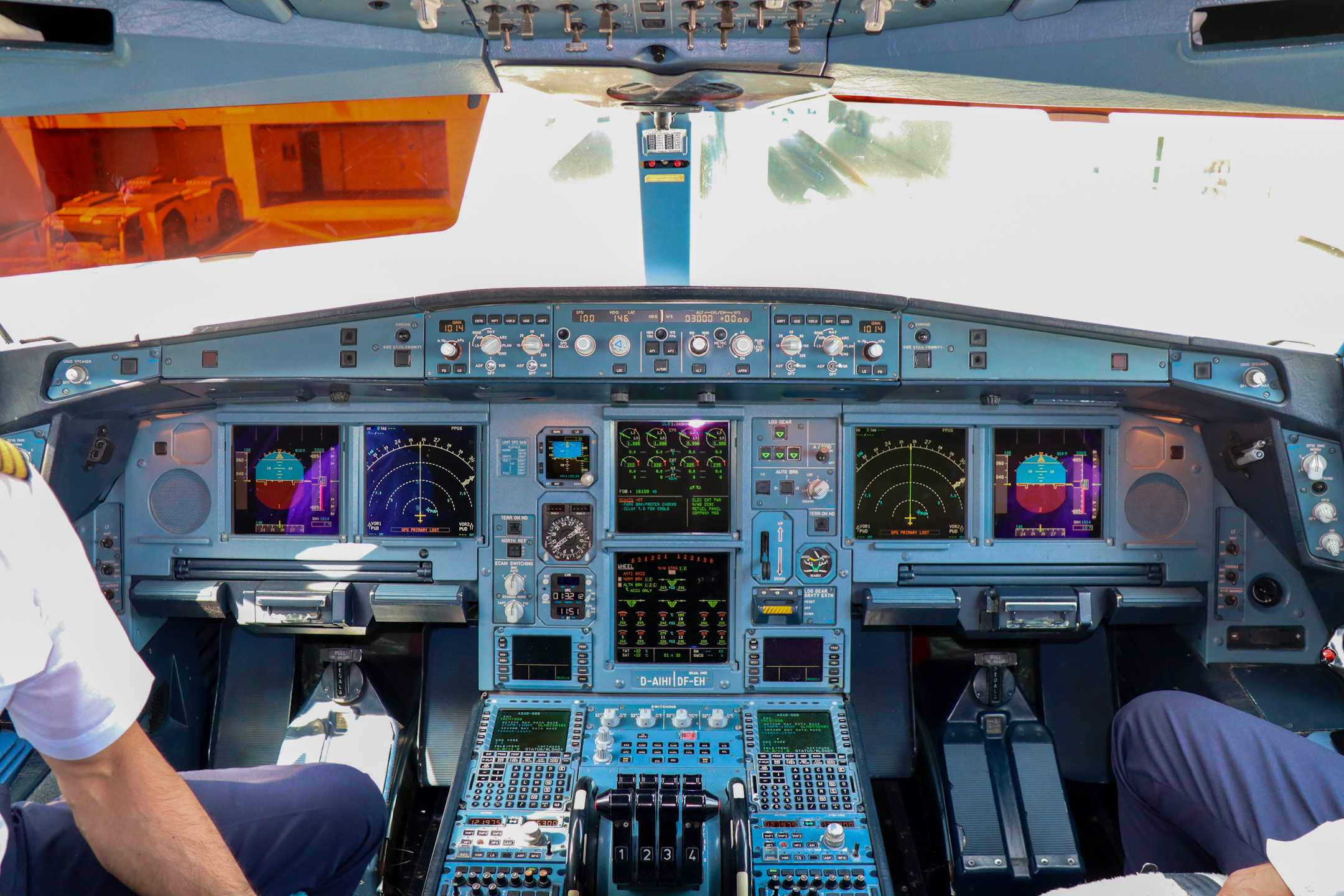

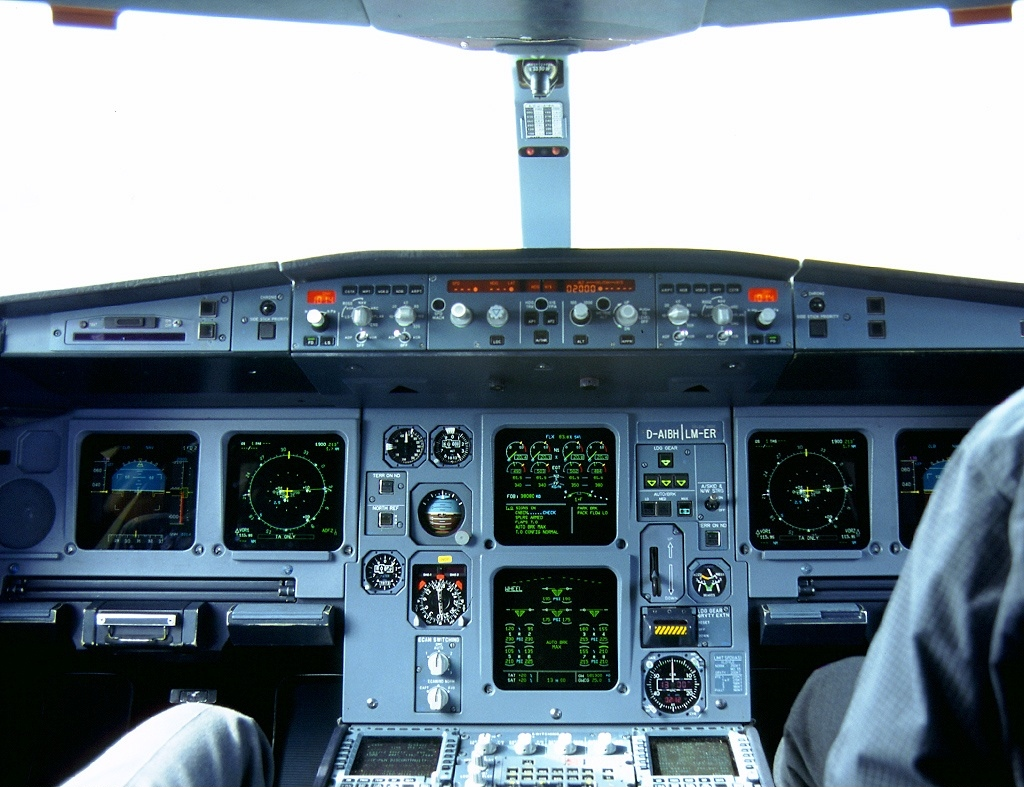
The flight deck of an Lufthansa A340-600, showing updated equipment and flight displays compared to the older A340-200/300 (below)

The A340-600 is 12 m (39 ft 4.4 in) longer than a −300, more than 4 m (13 ft 1.5 in) longer than the Boeing 747-400 and 2.3 m (7 ft 6.6 in) longer than the A380, and has two emergency exit doors added over the wings. It held the record for the world's longest commercial aircraft until the first flight of the Boeing 747-8 in February 2010. The A340-600 is powered by four 250 kN (56,000 lbf) thrust Rolls-Royce Trent 556 turbofans and uses the Honeywell 331–600[A] APU. As with the −500, it has a four-wheel undercarriage bogie on the fuselage centre-line to cope with the increased MTOW along with the enlarged wing and rear empennage, plus the -600 also has an additional centreline landing gear (CLG) due to its greater length and weight distribution. Standard on the -600 and optional on the -500 is the Taxiing Aid Camera System (TACS) consisting of two external cameras to provide pilots with a composite taxi view on the cockpit displays due to their longer airframes.

Due to the A340-600's long fuselage providing an unusually large lower-deck volume and structural flexibility, upper deck main cabin space can be optionally increased by locating facilities such as crew rest areas, galleys, and lavatories upon the aircraft's lower deck, to improve passenger flow on long-haul flights. Lufthansa was reportedly the only scheduled airline to implement lower deck lavatories. In early 2007, Airbus reportedly advised carriers to reduce cargo in the forward section by 5.0 t (11,000 lb) to compensate for overweight first and business-class sections; the additional weight caused the aircraft's centre of gravity to move forward, thus reducing cruise efficiency. Affected airlines considered filing compensation claims with Airbus.

The A340-600HGW (High Gross Weight) version first flew on 18 November 2005 and was certified on 14 April 2006. It has an MTOW of 380 t (840,000 lb) and a range of up to 14,630 km (7,900 nmi; 9,090 mi), made possible by strengthened structure, increased fuel capacity, more powerful engines, and new manufacturing techniques like laser beam welding. The A340-600HGW is powered by four 61,900 lbf (275 kN) thrust Rolls-Royce Trent 560 turbofans. Emirates became the launch customer for the −600HGW when it ordered 18 at the 2003 Paris Air Show; but postponed its order indefinitely and later cancelled it. Rival Qatar Airways, which placed its order at the same airshow, took delivery of only four aircraft, with the first aircraft on 11 September 2006. The airline has since let its purchase options expire in favour of orders for the Boeing 777-300ER.

The variant's main competitor is the 777-300ER. The A340-600 was replaced by the A350-1000.

=== Military designations ===
B.L.19
(Thai: บ.ล.๑๙) Royal Thai Armed Forces designation for the A340-541.

== Operators ==
Over the duration of the programme, a total of 377 A340 family aircraft were delivered, of which 187 are in service as of April 2025. The five largest scheduled airline operators are Lufthansa (12), Mahan Air (15), Conviasa (6), Edelweiss Air (5), and Swiss International Air Lines (4).

=== Deliveries ===
Deliveries
Type	Total	2012	2011	2010	2009	2008	2007	2006	2005	2004	2003	2002	2001	2000	1999	1998	1997	1996	1995	1994	1993
A340-200	28	–	–	–	–	–	–	–	–	–	–	–	–	–	–	1	3	3	5	4	12
A340-300	218	–	–	–	–	3	2	2	4	5	10	8	22	19	20	23	30	25	14	21	10
A340-500	34	2	–	2	2	1	4	5	9	7	2	–	–	–	–	–	–	–	–	–	–
A340-600	97	–	–	2	8	8	8	18	15	14	16	8	–	–	–	–	–	–	–	–	–
A340 family	377	2	–	4	10	12	14	25	28	26	28	16	22	19	20	24	33	28	19	25	22

'Note: The total number of deliveries corresponds to the Airbus O&D file, while the details are given in the ABCD list..'

== Accidents and incidents ==
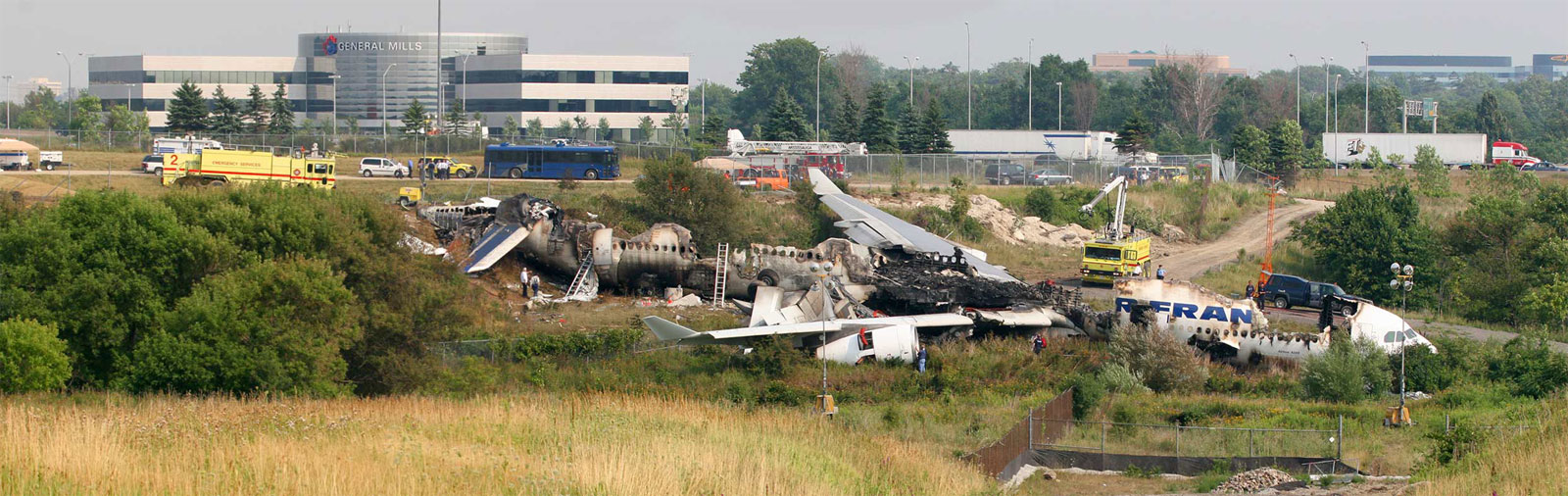
Remains of Air France Flight 358 at Toronto Pearson International Airport

The A340 has never been involved in a fatal accident, although there have been seven hull-loss accidents:

- 20 January 1994 – an Air France Airbus A340-200 registered as F-GNIA was destroyed by fire during servicing at Paris Charles de Gaulle Airport. This marks the first hull-loss of an A340.
- 5 November 1997 – Virgin Atlantic Flight 024, an Airbus A340-300 registered as G-VSKY China Girl, conducted an emergency landing on Runway 27L at London Heathrow Airport with the aircraft's left-main landing gear partially extended. The aircraft was repaired and returned to service.
- 29 August 1998 – a Sabena Airbus A340-200 registered as OO-SCW was severely damaged while landing on Runway 25L at Brussels Airport. The right main gear collapsed; the right engines and wingtip hit the runway and slid to the right in soft ground. The 248 passengers and 11 crew were safely evacuated. The cause of the gear failure was found to be a fatigue crack. Although severely damaged, the aircraft was repaired and returned to service for 16 years until it was stored.
- 24 July 2001 – a SriLankan Airlines Airbus A340-300 registered as 4R-ADD was destroyed on the ground at Bandaranaike International Airport, being one of 26 aircraft which were damaged or destroyed during an attack upon the airport by Liberation Tigers of Tamil Eelam militants.
- 2 August 2005 – Air France Flight 358, an Airbus A340-300 registered as F-GLZQ, was destroyed by a crash and subsequent fire after it overran runway 24L at Toronto Pearson International Airport while landing in a thunderstorm. The aircraft slid into Etobicoke Creek and caught fire. All 297 passengers and 12 crew survived; 43 people were injured, 12 seriously.
- 9 November 2007 – Iberia Flight 6463, an Airbus A340-600 registered as EC-JOH, was badly damaged after sliding off the runway at Ecuador's Mariscal Sucre International Airport. The landing gear collapsed and two engines broke off. All 345 passengers and 14 crew members were evacuated by inflatable slides, and there were no serious injuries. The aircraft was written off and scrapped.
- 15 November 2007 – An undelivered Airbus A340-642X, registered as F-WWCJ and destined for Etihad Airways, was undergoing ground testing at Toulouse–Blagnac Airport when it struck a blast wall, causing severe damage to the aircraft and injuries to the nine persons on board. The aircraft was written off and scrapped.
- 20 March 2009 – Emirates Flight 407, an Airbus A340-500 registered as A6-ERG, failed to take off properly from Melbourne Airport, hitting several structures at the end of the runway before eventually climbing enough to return to the airport for a safe landing. There were no injuries, but the occurrence was severe enough to be classified an accident by the Australian Transport Safety Bureau. The plane was subsequently repaired, and returned to service for five years before it was scrapped.
- 11 June 2018 – A Lufthansa Airbus A340-300 registered as D-AIFA was being towed with maintenance staff on board to the departure gate at Frankfurt Airport's terminal when the tow truck caught fire. The flames substantially damaged the aircraft's front section, and ten people on the ground received minor injuries. The damage was assessed to be beyond economical repair and the aircraft was written off.

== Aircraft on display ==
- The first prototype Airbus A340-300 (MSN001, registration F-WWAI), which performed the type's maiden flight on 25 October 1991, was donated to the Musée de l'air et de l'espace at Le Bourget in 2017 as part of a joint preservation initiative by Airbus. Following its relocation, it was preserved and put on public display alongside the museum's historic commercial aircraft collection.
- The original test prototype of the stretched Airbus A340-600 variant (MSN360, registration F-WWTTE) was donated by Airbus at the same time and delivered to the Aeroscopia museum at Toulouse-Blagnac Airport, Toulouse. It is exhibited alongside other pioneer company flight-test airframes, including the first Airbus A320 and the second test Airbus A380 (MSN2), which were transferred to the museum site under the same regional preservation agreement.
- A former AirAsia X Airbus A340-300 (MSN278, registration 9M-XAC) is preserved at the Angkasa Aviation Academy in Malacca, Malaysia. Following its retirement from commercial service, the aircraft was acquired by the academy and moved to its campus, where the intact airframe serves as both a static landmark exhibit and an interactive instructional ground trainer for engineering and cabin crew education.

== Specifications ==
Variant	A340-200	A340-300	A340-500	A340-600
Cockpit crew	Two			
3-class seats	210–250	250–290	270–310	320–370
typ. layout	303 (30F + 273Y)	335 (30F + 305Y)	313 (12F + 36J + 265Y)	380 (12F + 54J + 314Y)
Exit limit	420 (Note: 4 Type A doors) (Note: 9-abreast)/375 (Note: 8-abreast)	375/440	375	440/475
Length	59.4 m; 194 ft 11 in	63.69 m; 208 ft 11 in	67.93 m; 222 ft 10 in	75.36 m; 247 ft 3 in
Wingspan	60.3 m (198 ft)		63.45 m (208.2 ft)	
Wing	363.1 m^{2} (3,908 sq ft), 29.7° sweep, 10 AR		437.3 m^{2} (4,707 sq ft), 31.1° sweep, 9.2 AR	
Height	17.03 m (55.9 ft)	16.99 m (55.7 ft)	17.53 m (57.5 ft)	17.93 m (58.8 ft)
Fuselage	5.287 m (208.1 in) cabin width / 5.64 m (18.5 ft) outside width			
Cargo volume	132.4 m^{3} (4,680 cu ft)	158.4 m^{3} (5,590 cu ft)	149.7 m^{3} (5,290 cu ft)	201.7 m^{3} (7,120 cu ft)
MTOW	275 t (606,000 lb)	276.5 t (610,000 lb)	380 t (840,000 lb)	
Max. PL	51 t (112,000 lb)	52 t (115,000 lb)	54 t (119,000 lb)	66 t (146,000 lb)
OEW	118 t (260,000 lb)	131 t (289,000 lb)	168 t (370,000 lb)	174 t (384,000 lb)
Max. Fuel	110.4 t (243,395 lb)		175.2 t (386,292 lb)	155.5 t (342,905 lb) (Note: no aux. tank, 164 t (361,595 lb) with 1 aux. tank)
Engines (×4)	CFM International CFM56-5C		RR Trent 553	RR Trent 556
Thrust (×4)	138.78–151.24 kN (31,200–34,000 lb_{f})		248.12–275.35 kN (55,780–61,902 lbf)	
Speed	Max.: Mach 0.86 (494 kn; 915 km/h; 568 mph) at 12,000 m (39,000 ft); Cruise: Mach 0.82 (471 kn; 872 km/h; 542 mph) at 12,000 m (39,000 ft)			
Range, 3-class	13,500 km (7,300 nmi; 8,400 mi)	12,408 km (6,700 nmi; 7,710 mi)	16,670 km (9,000 nmi; 10,360 mi)	14,450 km (7,800 nmi; 8,980 mi)
Take off (Note: MTOW, SL, ISA)	2,900 m (9,500 ft)	3,000 m (10,000 ft)	3,350 m (10,990 ft)	3,400 m (11,200 ft)
Ceiling	12,527 m (41,099 ft)	12,634 m (41,450 ft)		

Line drawings

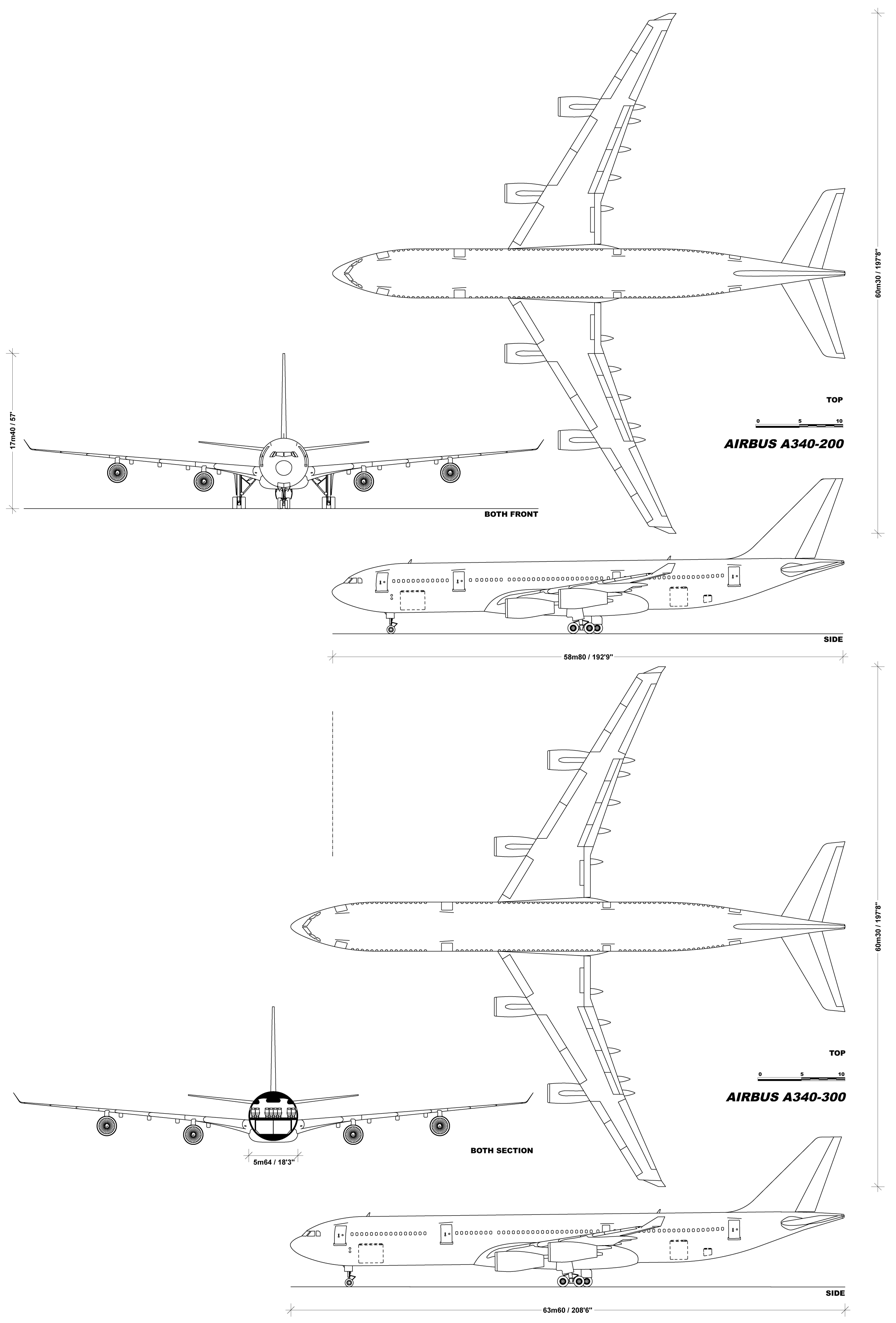
A340-200/300

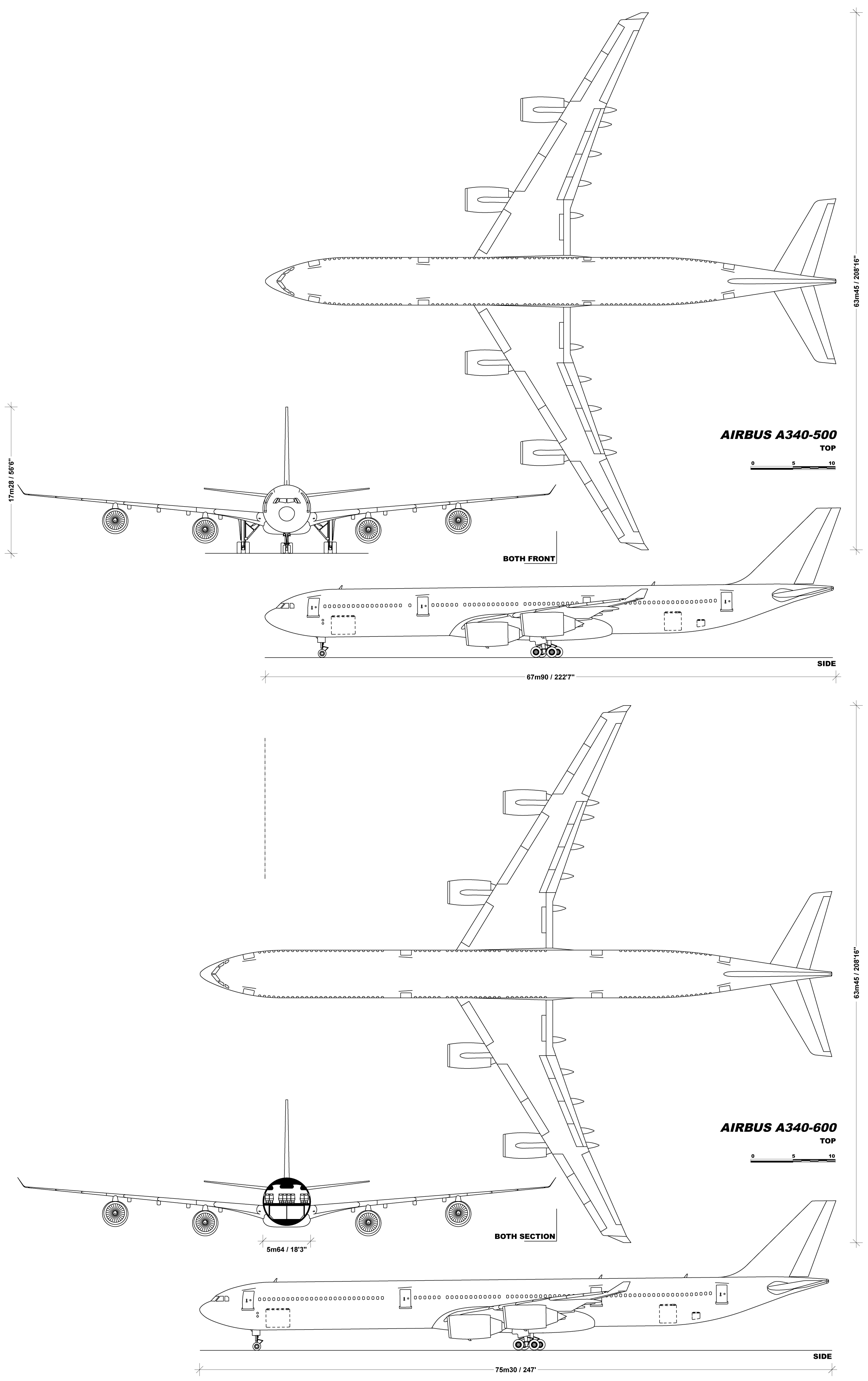
A340-500/600

=== Engines ===
Model	Certification date	Engines
A340-211	22 December 1992	CFM 56-5C2
A340-212	14 March 1994	CFM 56-5C3
A340-213	19 December 1995	CFM 56-5C4
A340-311	22 December 1992	CFM 56-5C2
A340-312	14 March 1994	CFM 56-5C3
A340-313	16 March 1995	CFM 56-5C4
A340-541	3 December 2002	RR Trent 553-61 / 553A2-61
A340-542	15 February 2007	RR Trent 556A2-61
A340-642	21 May 2002	RR Trent 556-61 / 556A2-61
A340-643	11 April 2006	RR Trent 560A2-61

== See also ==
- Competition between Airbus and Boeing
- Deli Mike, an Airbus A340-300 notable for its strange unreliability

Related development

- Airbus A330

Aircraft of comparable role, configuration, and era

- Boeing 777
- Ilyushin Il-96
- McDonnell Douglas MD-11

Related lists

- List of jet airliners
- List of civil aircraft
