= Virgin Atlantic Flight 024 =

1997 aviation accident in England

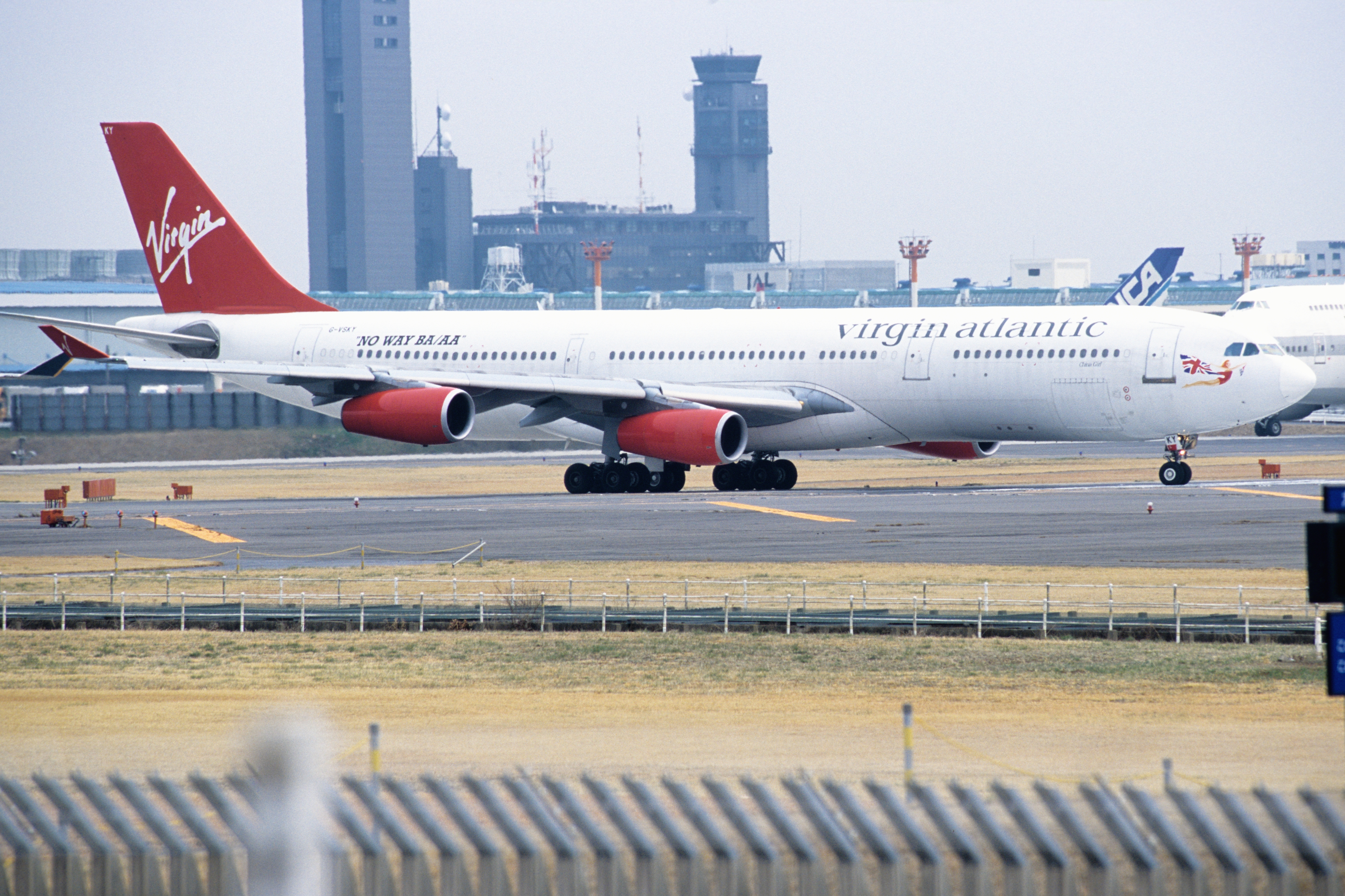
- G-VSKY, the aircraft involved in the accident

Accident
- Date: 5 November 1997
- Summary: Emergency landing after left main landing gear failed to deploy
- Site: Heathrow Airport, London, United Kingdom; 51°27′53″N 00°27′53″W

Aircraft
- Aircraft type: Airbus A340-311
- Aircraft name: China Girl
- Operator: Virgin Atlantic
- IATA flight No.: VS24
- ICAO flight No.: VIR24
- Call sign: VIRGIN 24
- Registration: G-VSKY
- Flight origin: Los Angeles International Airport, Los Angeles, California, United States
- Destination: Heathrow Airport, London, United Kingdom
- Occupants: 114
- Passengers: 98
- Crew: 16
- Fatalities: 0
- Injuries: 7
- Survivors: 114

Virgin Atlantic Flight 024 was a regularly scheduled Virgin Atlantic passenger flight from Los Angeles, California, to London, United Kingdom. On 5 November 1997, the Airbus A340 was forced to make an emergency landing at London Heathrow Airport after the left main landing gear failed to deploy. During the crash landing, the aircraft was damaged and later repaired. Of the 114 passengers and crew aboard, 7 were lightly injured.

== Aircraft ==
The aircraft involved was an Airbus A340-311, registered G-VSKY with manufacturer serial number 016. It made its first flight on 3 November 1993 and was delivered soon after to Virgin Atlantic on 21 January 1994. At the time of the accident, the aircraft had flown 19,323 hours. It was fitted with four CFM International CFM56-5C2 high-bypass turbofan engines.

== Accident ==
At 05:09 GMT (21:09 local time), flight VS024 departed from runway 24L in Los Angeles following a 19-minute delay. While climbing, the crew noticed that the landing gear was slow to retract. Later, during a routine in-flight systems scan, it was noted that the no. 6 brake temperature sensor on the inboard rear wheel of the main landing gear had failed, but the flight was otherwise uneventful.

At 15:04 GMT, while on final approach to Runway 27L at London Heathrow, the crew received an aural "Gear unsafe" alert after deploying the landing gear, After which, the first officer, who was the pilot flying, elected to go around at 2.5 nm from the runway threshold and return to a holding pattern to attempt to resolve the problem.

The crew decided to fly near the ATC tower to have a controller visually identify any problem. It was found that after attempting to gravity drop the left main landing gear, that it was stuck in a partially deployed position. The crew tried to complete several manoeuvres to free the landing gear without success. The crew had planned to touch the runway with the right main landing gear and immediately go around, hoping to shake the landing gear into a locked position but this was not attempted.

When the crew realized that it was impossible to deploy the left main landing gear, the passengers and airport were prepared for an emergency landing. At 16:08 with the aircraft nearly out of fuel, a "Mayday" was declared. The crew chose to land the plane on runway 27L, believing the lopsided aircraft would turn away from airport facilities once on the ground and towards empty space.

As the aircraft touched down, engine 4 struck the runway and the right main landing gear tyres burst. Soon after, engines 1 and 2 also struck the ground, bursting into flames. Once the aircraft veered to the left and stopped passengers were evacuated, seven of which suffered minor injuries.

== Cause ==
The accident was caused by the following factors:

- Full deployment of the left main landing gear was prevented because the unrestrained end of the No. 6 brake torque rod became trapped in the keel beam structure within the gear bay. It jammed the landing gear in a partially deployed position.
- The torque pin that had connected the No. 6 brake torque rod to the wheel brake had disengaged during landing gear retraction after takeoff from Los Angeles, allowing the unrestrained rod to pivot freely about the retained end.
- The torque pin and its retaining assembly had been subject to higher axial and torsional loads than predicted during aircraft braking in service. These loads were the result of elastic deformation of the wheel axle, brake, and torque rod, and due to assembly without the correct axial clearance as a result of prior undetected displacement of the associated bushes. The precise mode of failure of the retaining assembly bolt, nut, and cotter, could not be ascertained in the absence of these parts.
- This design of wheel brake assembly had satisfactorily passed the related wheel brake structural torque test. The latter however, contained no requirement to use a representative axle or other means to reproduce the axle deflections which occur during aircraft braking in service. As a result, the inspection did not require post torque test strip assessment of brake assemblies, in turn resulted in an over stressing deformation which produced component failure.

== Aftermath ==
The aircraft sustained considerable damage, including to three engines and the landing gear. Runway 27L was damaged after the tyres burst.

== See also ==
- List of accidents and incidents involving commercial aircraft
- LOT Polish Airlines Flight 16
- Jeju Air Flight 2216
