= Airbus A330 =

Twin-aisle airliner family

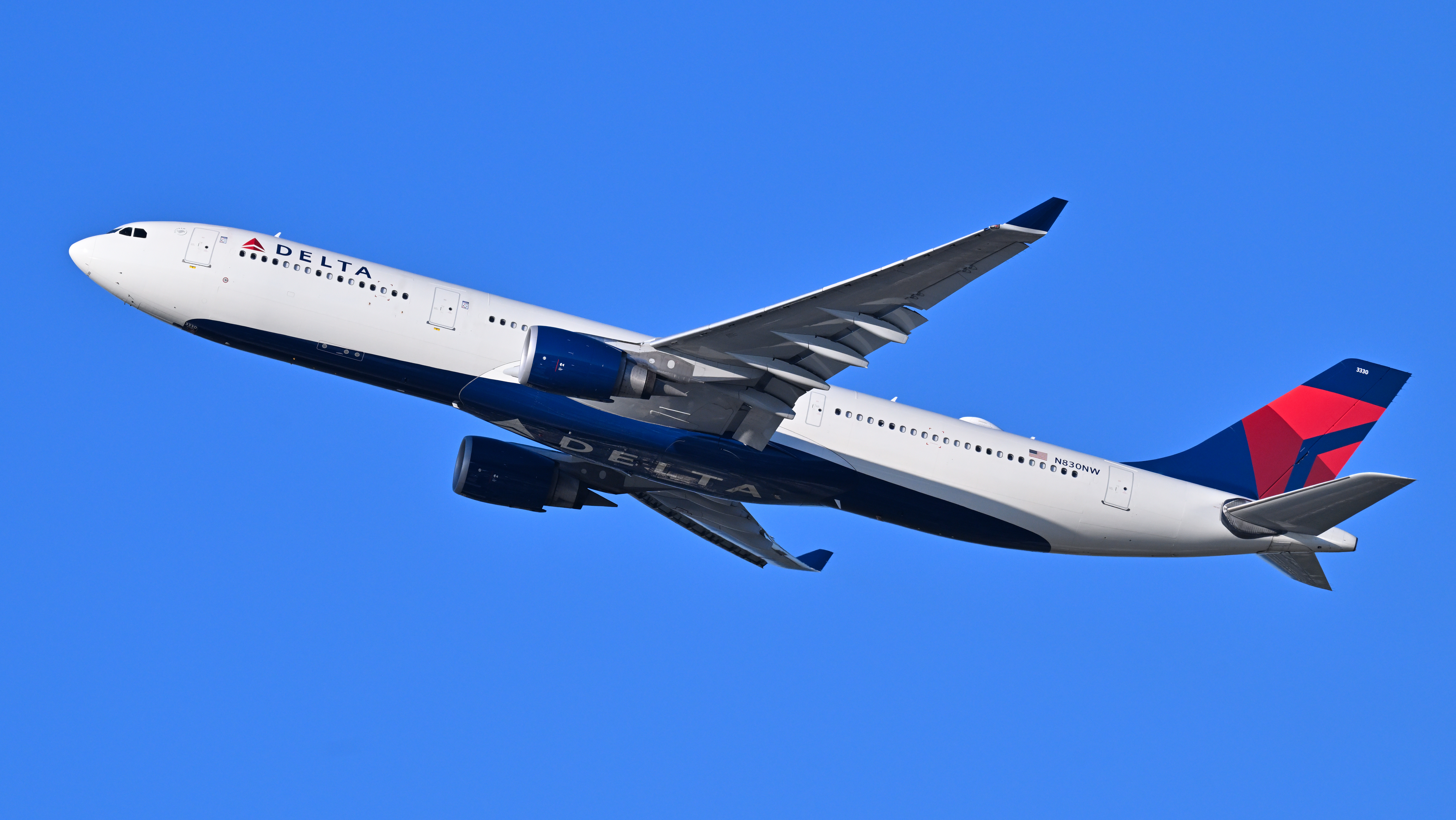
- An Airbus A330-300 operated by Delta Air Lines, the largest operator of the family

General information
- Role: Wide-body airliner
- National origin: Multi-national (Note: Final assembly in France)
- Manufacturer: Airbus
- Status: In service
- Primary users: Delta Air Lines: Turkish Airlines; China Eastern Airlines; Cathay Pacific
- Number built: 1,678 as of October 2026

History
- Manufactured: 1992–2020 (A330ceo); 2015–present (A330neo)
- Introduction date: 17 January 1994 with Air Inter
- First flight: 2 November 1992; 34 years ago
- Developed from: Airbus A300
- Variants: Airbus A330 MRTT; Airbus CC-330 Husky
- Developed into: Airbus A330neo; Airbus Beluga XL

The Airbus A330 is a wide-body airliner developed and produced by Airbus. Airbus began developing larger A300 derivatives in the mid–1970s, giving rise to the A330 twinjet as well as the Airbus A340 quadjet, and launched both designs along with their first orders in June 1987. The A330-300, the first variant, took its maiden flight in November 1992 and entered service with Air Inter in January 1994. The A330-200, a shortened longer-range variant, followed in 1998 with Canada 3000 as the launch operator.

The A330 shares many underpinnings with the airframe of the early A340 variants, most notably the same wing components, and by extension the same structure. However, the A330 has two main landing gear legs instead of three, lower weights, and slightly different fuselage lengths. Both airliners have fly-by-wire controls as well as a similar glass cockpit on order to increase commonality between the types. The A330 was Airbus's first airliner to offer a choice of three engines: the General Electric CF6, Pratt & Whitney PW4000, or the Rolls-Royce Trent 700. The A330-300 has a range of 11,750 km (6,340 nmi; 7,300 mi) with 277 passengers, while the shorter A330-200 can cover 13,450 km (7,260 nmi; 8,360 mi) with 247 passengers. Other variants include the A330-200F dedicated freighter, the A330 MRTT military aerial refueling variant, and the ACJ330 corporate jet. The A330 MRTT was proposed as the EADS/Northrop Grumman KC-45 for the US Air Force's KC-X competition, but lost to the Boeing KC-46 in appeal after an initial win.

In July 2014, Airbus announced the re-engined A330neo (new engine option) comprising the A330-800 and -900, which entered service with TAP Air Portugal in December 2018. With the exclusive, more efficient Trent 7000 turbofan and improvements including sharklets, it offers up to 14% better fuel economy per seat. The first-generation A330s (-200, -200F, and -300) are now called A330ceo (current engine option).

Delta Air Lines is the largest A330 family operator with 81 aircraft in its fleet as of October 2026. A total of 2,040 orders have been placed for the A330 family, of which 1,678 have been delivered and 1,403 are in service with 150 operators. The global A330 fleet had accumulated more than 75 million flight hours since its entry into service. The A330 is the second most delivered wide-body airliner after the Boeing 777, and competes with larger variants of the Boeing 767, smaller variants of the 777, and the 787. It is complemented by the larger Airbus A350, which succeeded the four-engined A340. As of June 2024, the Airbus A330 has been involved in 46 aviation accidents and incidents, including 14 hull-losses (10 due to flight related accidents and 4 due to strikes as part of armed conflicts), for a total of 339 fatalities.

== Development ==
=== Background ===
Airbus jetliners, 1974–1994
Model	A300	A310	A320	A330	A340
Introduced	1974	1983	1988	1994	1993
Body	Wide	Wide	Narrow	Wide	Wide
Engines	2	2	2	2	4
Range	4,050 nmi (7,500 km; 4,660 mi)	4,350 nmi (8,060 km; 5,010 mi)	3,000 nmi (5,600 km; 3,500 mi)	6,350 nmi (11,760 km; 7,310 mi)	7,300 nmi (13,500 km; 8,400 mi)

A330 and A340 seating and range comparison

Airbus's first airliner, the A300, was envisioned as part of a diverse family of commercial aircraft. Pursuing this goal, studies began in the early 1970s into derivatives of the A300. Before introducing the A300, Airbus identified nine possible variations designated B1 through B9. A tenth variant, the A300B10, was conceived in 1973 and developed into the longer-range Airbus A310. Airbus then focused its efforts on single-aisle (SA) studies, conceiving a family of airliners later known as the Airbus A320 family, the first commercial aircraft with digital fly-by-wire controls. During these studies, Airbus turned its focus back to the wide-body aircraft market, simultaneously working on both projects.

In the mid 1970s, Airbus began development of the A300B9, a larger derivative of the A300, which would eventually become the A330. The B9 was essentially a lengthened A300 with the same wing, coupled with the most powerful turbofan engines available. It was targeted at the growing demand for high-capacity, medium-range, transcontinental trunk routes. Offering the same range and payload as the McDonnell Douglas DC-10 but with 25 per cent better fuel efficiency, the B9 was seen as a viable replacement for the DC-10 and the Lockheed L-1011 TriStar trijets. It was also considered as a medium-ranged successor to the A300.

At the same time, a 200-seat four-engine version, the B11 (which would eventually become the A340) was also under development. The B11 was originally planned to take the place of narrow-body Boeing 707s and Douglas DC-8s then in commercial use, but would later evolve to target the long-range, wide-body trijet replacement market. To differentiate from the SA series, the B9 and B11 were re-designated as the TA9 and TA11, with TA standing for "twin aisle". Development costs were reduced by the two aircraft using the same fuselage and wing, with projected savings of US$500 million. Another factor was the split preference of those within Airbus and, more importantly, those of prospective customers; twinjets were favoured in North America, quad-jets desired in Asia, and operators had mixed views in Europe. Airbus ultimately found that most potential customers favoured four engines for their exemption from existing twinjet range restrictions and their ability to be ferried with one inactive engine. As a result, development plans prioritised the four-engined TA11 ahead of the TA9.

=== Design effort ===
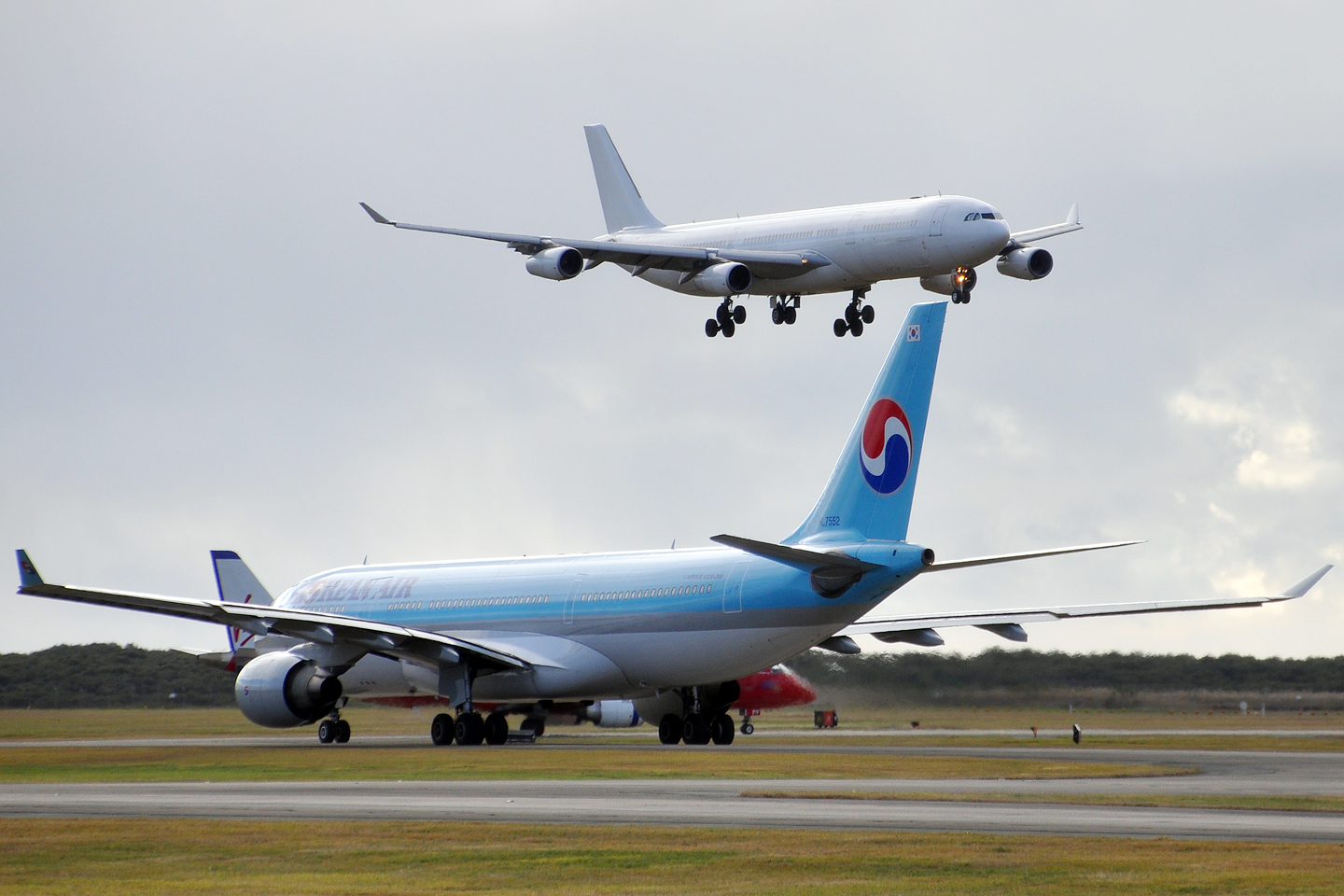
Compared to the A330 twinjet (on ground), the heavier A340 (in flight) has four engines and a centre-line wheel bogie.

The first specifications for the TA9 and TA11 aircraft that could accommodate 410 passengers in a one-class layout emerged in 1982. They showed a large underfloor cargo area that could hold five cargo pallets or sixteen LD3 cargo containers in the forward, and four pallets or fourteen LD3s in the aft hold—double the capacity of the Lockheed L-1011 TriStar or DC-10, and 8.46 metres (27.8 ft) longer than the Airbus A300. By June 1985, the TA9 and TA11 had received more improvements, including the adoption of the A320 flight deck, digital fly-by-wire (FBW) control system, and side-stick control. Airbus had developed a common cockpit for their aircraft models to allow quick transition by pilots. The flight crews could transition from one type to another after only one week's training, which reduces operator costs. The two TAs would use the vertical stabiliser, rudder, and circular fuselage sections of the A300-600, extended by two barrel sections.

Airbus briefly considered the variable camber wing, a concept that requires changing the wing profile for a given phase of flight. Studies were carried out by British Aerospace (BAe), now part of BAE Systems, at Hatfield and Bristol. Airbus estimated this would yield a two per cent improvement in aerodynamic efficiency, but the feature was rejected because of cost and difficulty of development. A true laminar flow wing (a low-drag shape that improves fuel efficiency) was also considered but rejected.

With necessary funding available, the Airbus Supervisory Board approved the development of the A330 and A340 with potential customers on 27 January 1986. Its chairman Franz Josef Strauss stated afterwards:

"Airbus Industrie is now in a position to finalise the detailed technical definition of the TA9, now officially designated as the A330, and the TA11, now called the A340, with potential launch customer airlines, and to discuss with them the terms and conditions for launch commitments."

The designations were originally reversed and were switched so the quad-jet airliner would have a "4" in its name. Airbus hoped for five airlines to sign for both the A330 and A340, and on 12 May, sent sale proposals to the most likely candidates, including Lufthansa and Swissair.

==== Engines ====
From the beginning of the TA9's development, a choice of engines from the three major engine manufacturers, Rolls-Royce, Pratt & Whitney, and GE Aviation, was planned. GE Aviation first offered the CF6-80C2. However, later studies indicated that more thrust was needed to increase the initial power capability from 267 to 289 kN (60,000 to 65,000 lbf). GE enlarged the CF6-80C2 fan from 236 to 244 centimetres (92.9 to 96.1 in) and reduced the number of fan blades from 38 to 34 to create the CF6-80E1 with a thrust of 300–320 kN (67,000–72,000 lbf).

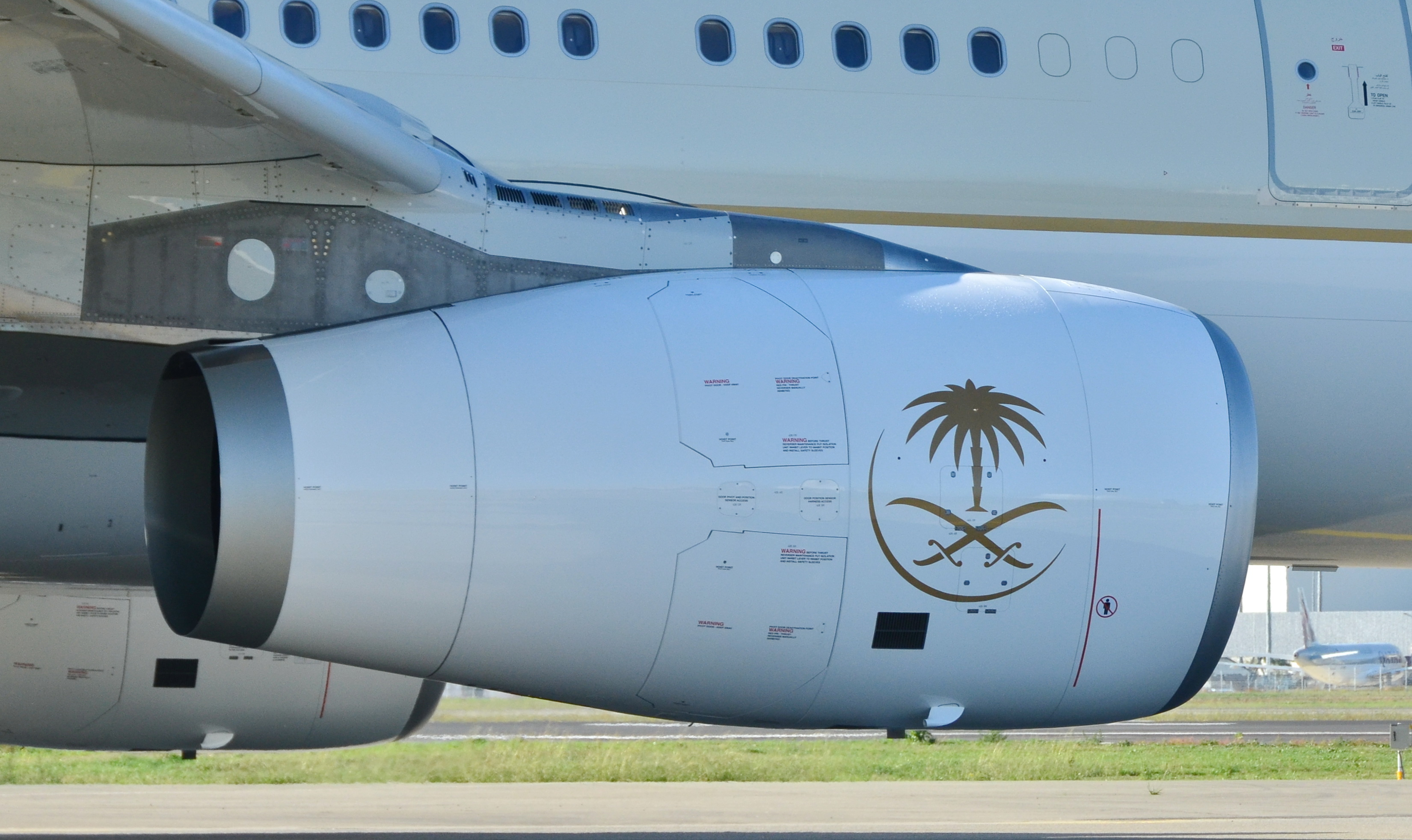
Rolls-Royce's Trent 700 features a mixed exhaust.

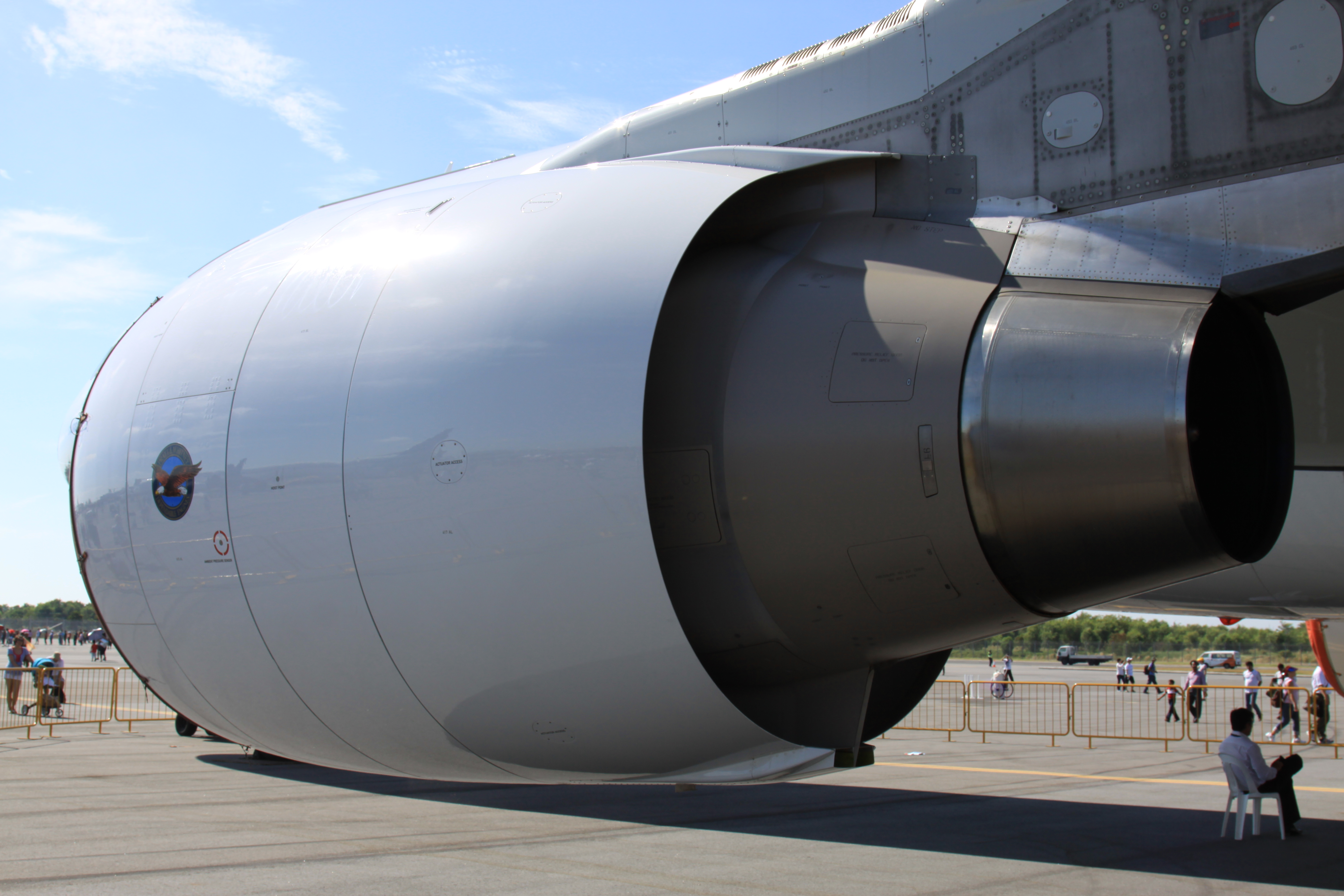
Pratt & Whitney's PW4000 has a more conventional unmixed exhaust.

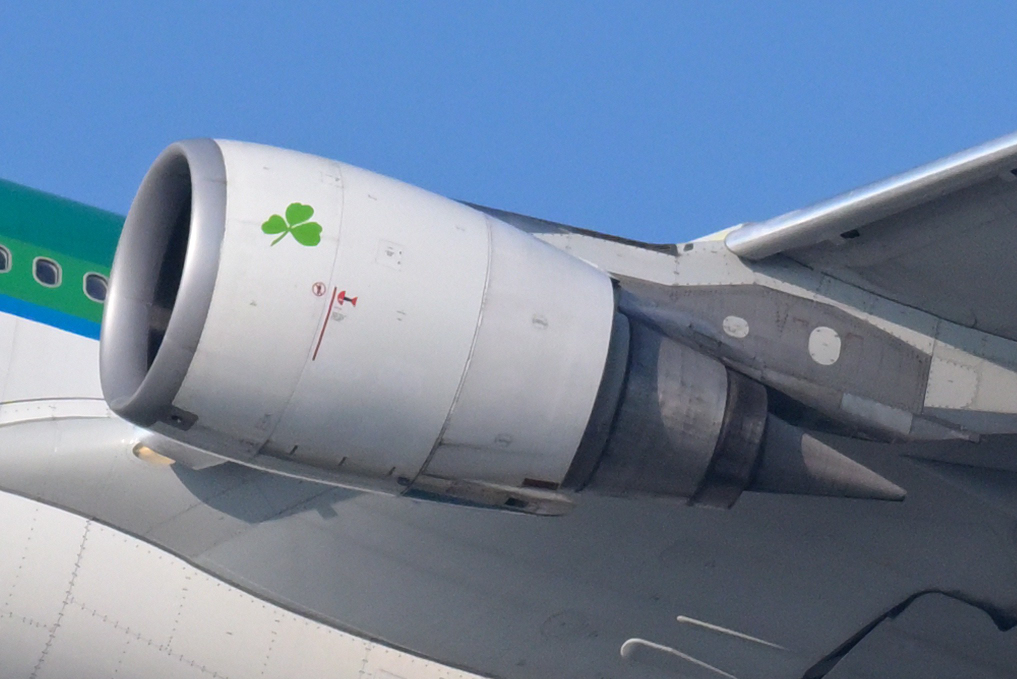
The GE CF6 also has an unmixed exhaust, but adds a pointed exhaust cone.

Rolls-Royce initially wanted to use the 267 kN (60,000 lbf) Trent 600 to power Airbus's newest twinjet and the upcoming McDonnell Douglas MD-11. However, the company later agreed to develop an engine solely for the A330, the Trent 700, with a larger diameter and 311 kN (69,900 lbf) of thrust. The A330 became the first Airbus aircraft for which Rolls-Royce supplied engines.

Similarly, Pratt & Whitney signed an agreement that covered the development of the A330-exclusive PW4168. The company increased the fan size from 94 in (2.39 m) to 100 in (2.54 m), enabling the engine to deliver 311 kN (69,900 lbf) of thrust. Like the CF6-80E1, 34 blades were used instead of the 38 found on the smaller PW4000 engines.

=== Production and testing ===
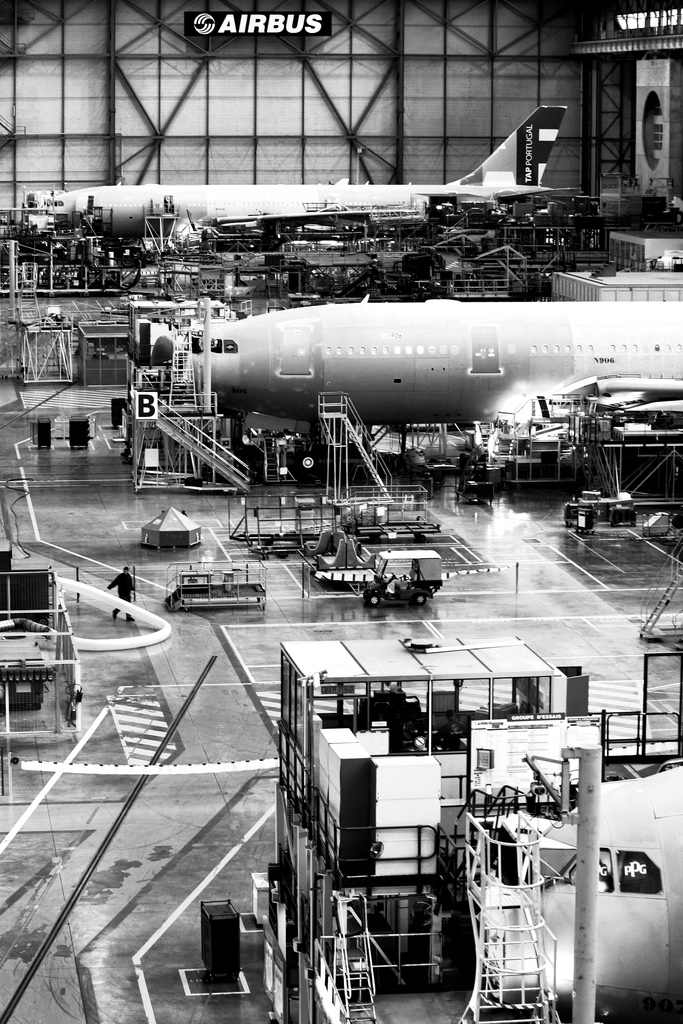
A330 final assembly line in Toulouse in 2007

In preparation for the production of the A330 and the A340, Airbus's partners invested heavily in new facilities. In south-western England, BAe made a £7 million investment in a three-storey technical centre with 15,000 m^{2} (161,000 sq ft) of floor area at Filton. In north Wales, BAe also spent £5 million on a new production line at its Broughton wing production plant. In Germany, Messerschmitt-Bölkow-Blohm (MBB) invested DM400 million ($225 million) on manufacturing facilities in the Weser estuary, including at Bremen, Einswarden, Varel, and Hamburg. France saw the biggest investments, with Aérospatiale constructing a new Fr.2.5 billion ($411 million) final-assembly plant adjacent to Toulouse-Blagnac Airport in Colomiers; by November 1988, the pillars for the new Clément Ader assembly hall had been erected. The assembly process featured increased automation, such as robots drilling holes and installing fasteners during the wing-to-fuselage mating process.

On 12 March 1987, Airbus received the first orders for the twinjet. Domestic French airline Air Inter placed 5 firm orders and 15 options, while Thai Airways International requested 8 aircraft, split evenly between firm orders and options. Airbus announced the next day that it would formally launch the A330 and A340 programmes by April 1987, with deliveries of the A340 to begin in May 1992 and A330 deliveries to start in 1993. Northwest Airlines signed a letter of intent for twenty A340s and ten A330s on 31 March. In 2001, the program cost with the A340 was $3.5 billion (equivalent to $6.07 billion in 2025).

BAe eventually received £450 million of funding from the UK government, well short of the £750 million it had originally requested for the design and construction of the wings. The German and French governments also provided funding. Airbus issued subcontracts to companies in Australia, Austria, Canada, China, Greece, Italy, India, Japan, South Korea, Portugal, the United States, and the former Yugoslavia. With funding in place, Airbus launched the A330 and A340 programmes on 5 June 1987, just before the Paris Air Show. At that time, the order book stood at 130 aircraft from ten customers, including lessor International Lease Finance Corporation (ILFC). Of the order total, forty-one were for A330s. In 1989, Asian carrier Cathay Pacific joined the list of purchasers, ordering nine A330s and later increasing this number to eleven.

The wing-to-fuselage mating of the first A330, the tenth airframe of the A330 and A340 line, began in mid February 1992. This aircraft, coated with anti-corrosion paint, was rolled out on 31 March without its General Electric CF6-80E1 engines, which were installed by August. During a static test, the wing failed just below requirement; BAe engineers later resolved the problem. At the 1992 Farnborough Airshow, Northwest deferred delivery of sixteen A330s to 1994, following the cancellation of its A340 orders.

The first completed A330 was rolled out on 14 October 1992, with the maiden flight following on 2 November. Weighing 181,840 kg (401,000 lb), including 20,980 kg (46,300 lb) of test equipment, the A330 became the largest twinjet to have flown until the first flight of the Boeing 777. The flight lasted five hours and fifteen minutes during which speed, height, and other flight configurations were tested. Airbus intended the test flight programme to comprise six aircraft flying a total of 1,800 hours. On 21 October 1993, the A330 received the European Joint Aviation Authorities (JAA) and the US Federal Aviation Administration (FAA) certifications simultaneously after 1,114 cumulative airborne test hours and 426 test flights. At the same time, weight tests came in favourable, showing the plane was 500 kg (1,100 lb) underweight.

On 30 June 1994, a fatal crash occurred during certification of the Pratt & Whitney engine when an A330 crashed near Toulouse. Both pilots and the five passengers died. The flight was designed to test autopilot response during a one-engine-off worst-case scenario with the centre of gravity near its aft limit. Shortly after takeoff, the pilots had difficulty setting the autopilot, and the aircraft lost speed and crashed. An investigation by an internal branch of Direction Générale d'Aviation concluded that the accident resulted from slow response and incorrect actions by the crew during the recovery. This led to a revision of A330 operating procedures.

=== Entry into service ===
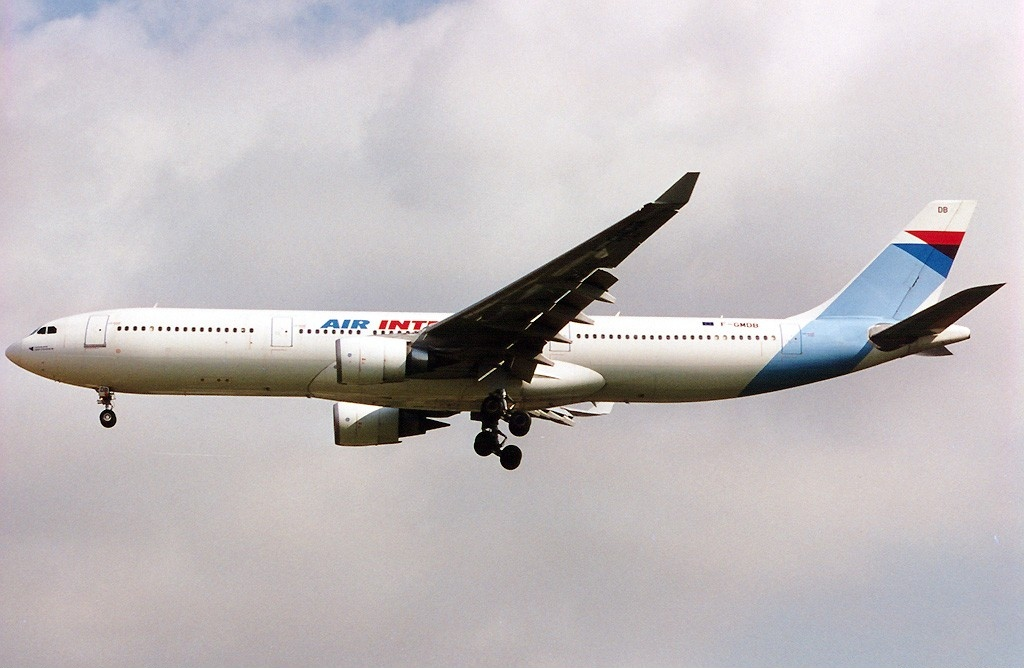
Air Inter introduced the A330-300 on 17 January 1994 as its launch operator.

Air Inter became the first operator of the A330, having put the aircraft into service on 17 January 1994 between Orly Airport, Paris, and Marseille. Deliveries to Malaysia Airlines (MAS) and Thai Airways International were postponed to address delamination of the composite materials in the PW4168 engine's thrust reverser assembly. Thai Airways received its first A330 during the second half of the year, operating it on routes from Bangkok to Taipei and Seoul. Cathay Pacific received its Trent 700 A330s following the certification of that engine on 22 December 1994. MAS received its A330 on 1 February 1995 and then rescheduled its other ten orders. Its initial range was around 4,000 nautical miles but subsequent refinements increased the range of newer models to 5,000 nautical miles and by 2015, the range was 6,100 nautical miles.

=== A330-200 ===
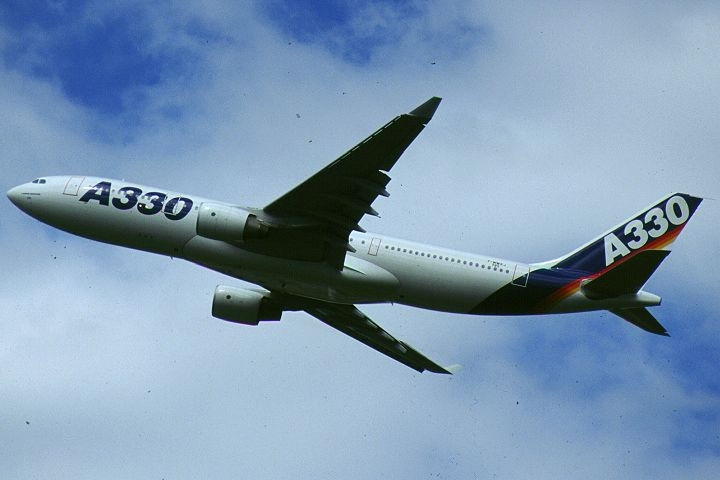
The A330-200 first flew on 13 August 1997.

In response to a decline in A330-300 sales, increased market penetration by the Boeing 767-300ER, and airline requests for increased range and smaller aircraft, Airbus developed the A330-200. Known as the A329 and A330M10 during development, the A330-200 would offer nine per cent lower operating costs than the Boeing 767-300ER. The plane was aimed at the 11,900 km (6,430 nmi; 7,390 mi) sector, where Airbus predicted demand for 800 aircraft between 1995 and 2015. The project, with US$450 million in expected development costs, was approved by the Airbus Industrie Supervisory Board on 24 November 1995.

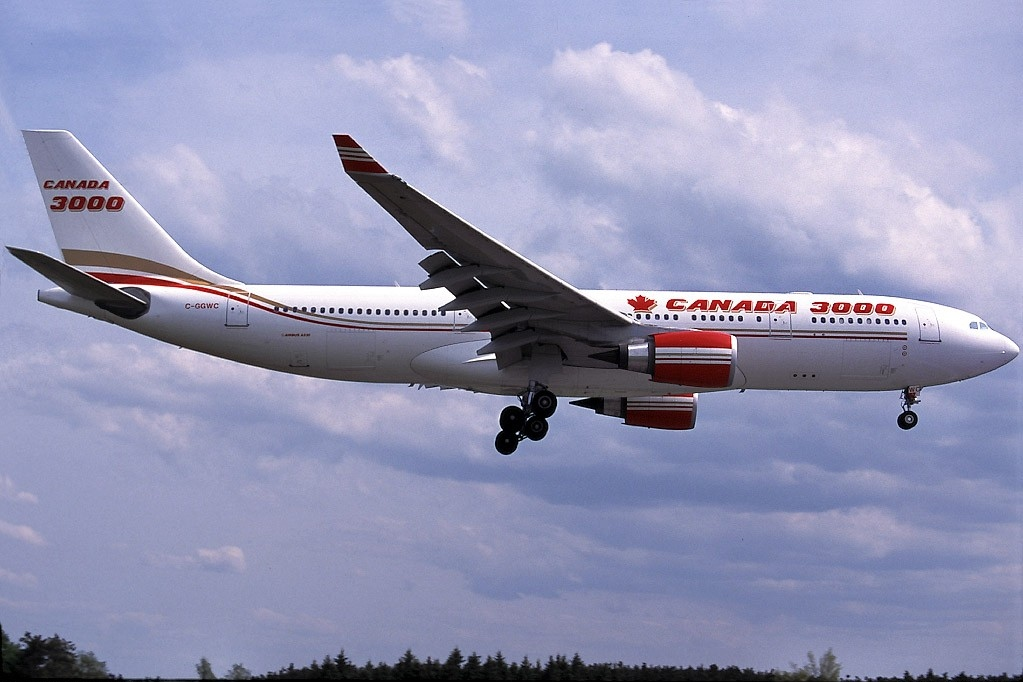
Canada 3000 was the A330-200's launch operator in April 1998.

The A330-200 first flew on 13 August 1997. The sixteen-month certification process involved logging 630 hours of test flights. The A330-200's first customer was ILFC; these aircraft were leased by Canada 3000, who became the type's first operator.

As Airbus worked on its A330-200, hydraulic pump problems were reported by both A330 and A340 operators. This issue was the suspected cause of a fire that destroyed an Air France A340-200 in January 1994. On 4 January of that year, a Malaysia Airlines A330-300, while undergoing regular maintenance at Singapore Changi Airport, was consumed by a fire that started in the right-hand main undercarriage well. The incident caused US$30 million in damage, and the aircraft took six months to repair. Consequently, operators were advised to disable electrical pumps in January 1997.

=== Proposed variants ===
A330-400/600

In 1996, Airbus evaluated a 12-frame stretch which would be able to carry 380 passengers over almost 7,000 km (3,800 nmi; 4,300 mi), the -400, and a "super-stretch" using the A340-600's 22-frame stretch and powered by 400 kN (90,000 lbf) engines, the -600.

A330-100/500

In February 2000, it was reported that a 250-seat A330-100 replacement for the A300/A310 could be launched by year end for 2003 deliveries. Shortened and keeping its fly-by-wire cockpit and systems, with a cleaner A300-600 wing with sealed control surfaces and winglets and at least two new engine types among the GE CF6-80, the PW4000 and the A340-500/600's Trent 500 aimed for 5% better SFC than the A300-600. Its 44.8 m (147 ft) wing allowed a 173 t (381,000 lb) MTOW and 4,200 nmi (7,770 km; 4,830 mi) range. In May, the 210-260 seat design had evolved towards keeping the A330 60.3 m (198 ft) span wing and engines for a 195 t MTOW and 4,500 nmi (8,300 km; 5,200 mi) range. Interested customers included Singapore Airlines, Lufthansa and Hapag-Lloyd.

Announced in July at Farnborough Air Show, the -500 first flight was targeted for early 2003 and introduction in early 2004. ILFC would take ten if it was launched and CIT was interested too. The eight-frame shrink would carry 222 in three classes or 266 in two classes. Its initial 13,000 km (7,000 nmi; 8,100 mi) range would be followed by derated versions for 8,000 km (4,300 nmi; 5,000 mi). The market was lukewarm as airlines like Lufthansa, Hapag-Lloyd and Singapore Airlines were unimpressed by the long-range A330-500, favouring a more refined short-range design. Lack of airline demand made lessors interest wane and as ILFC would order as 30 -500s, it would be with converting rights to larger A330-200/300.

A330-200Lite

To compete with Boeing's 7E7 (later 787), Airbus offered a minimum-change derivative called the A330-200Lite in 2004. As the name indicated, this proposed variant would have had a lower maximum takeoff weight of 202 tonnes (445,000 lb), coupled with de-rated engines, giving a range of 7,400 km (4,000 nmi; 4,600 mi). It was aimed at Singapore Airlines, who had looked to replace its Airbus A310-300s. The variant was also to be a replacement for Airbus A300-600Rs and early Boeing 767s. Airlines, however, were not satisfied with the compromised aircraft; the company instead proceeded with an entirely new aircraft, the A350 XWB.

=== Further developments ===
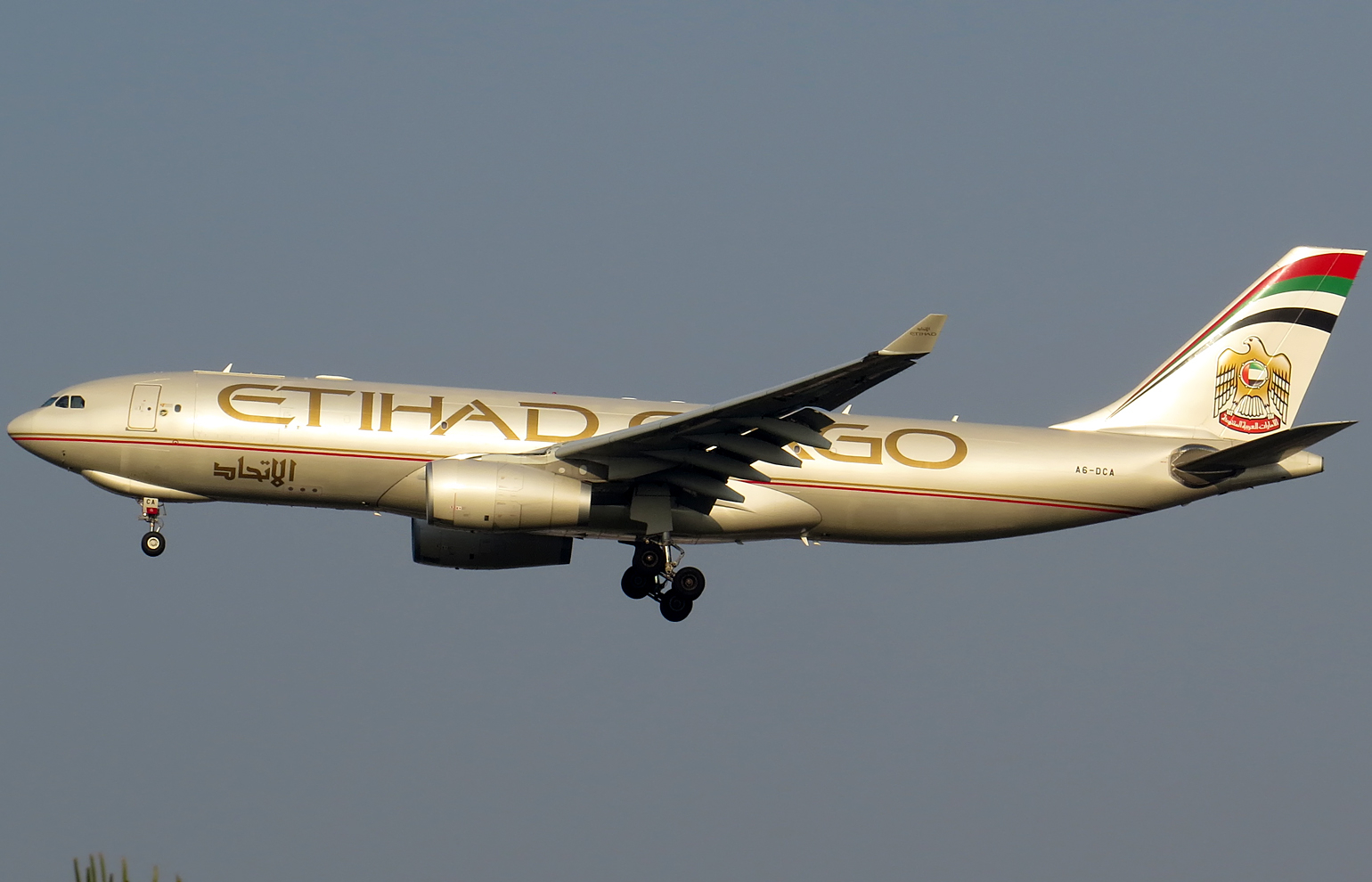
The A330-200F freighter was first delivered to Etihad Cargo in July 2010.

Initially, the GE90 was only one of three Boeing 777 options, and GE Aviation then-CEO Brian H. Rowe would have paid for the development of putting it on an A330; however, Airbus' strategy for long-haul was the four-engine A340, missing the market favouring twins.

Responding to lagging A300-600F and A310F sales, Airbus began marketing the Airbus A330-200F, a freighter derivative of the A330-200, around 2001. The freighter has a range of 7,400 km (4,000 nmi; 4,600 mi) with a 65 tonnes (140,000 lb) payload, or 5,900 km (3,200 nmi; 3,700 mi) with 70 tonnes (150,000 lb). The plane uses the same nosegear as the passenger version; however, it is attached lower in the fuselage and housed in a distinctive bulbous "blister fairing". This raises the aircraft's nose so that the cargo deck is level during loading, as the standard A330's landing gear results the plane having a nose-down attitude while on the ground.

The A330-200F made its maiden flight on 5 November 2009. This marked the start of a four-month, 180-hour certification programme. JAA and FAA certifications were expected by March the following year although approval by the JAA was delayed until April. The first delivery was subsequently made to the Etihad Airways cargo division, Etihad Cargo, in July 2010.

On 25 September 2013, at the Aviation Expo China (Beijing Airshow), Airbus announced a new lower weight A330-300 variant, optimised for use on domestic and regional routes in high growth markets with large populations and concentrated traffic flows; China and India were recognised as prime targets. This variant could carry up to 400 passengers. The increased efficiency, however, comes more from the installation of additional seats than any weight reduction. On relatively short, yet congested routes, the A330 competes against single-aisle jetliners. While the A330's operating costs in these conditions are not far above those of the Boeing 737 or Airbus A321, the A320neo and 737 MAX promise more efficiency. Where the frequency of flights cannot be increased, using larger aircraft, such as the A330, is the only available option to increase capacity. The first customer for the A330 Regional was announced as Saudia at the 2015 Paris Air Show. In 2018, the unit cost of an A330-200 was US$238.5M, US$264.2M for an A330-300 and US$241.7M for an A330-200F.

=== New Engine Option ===
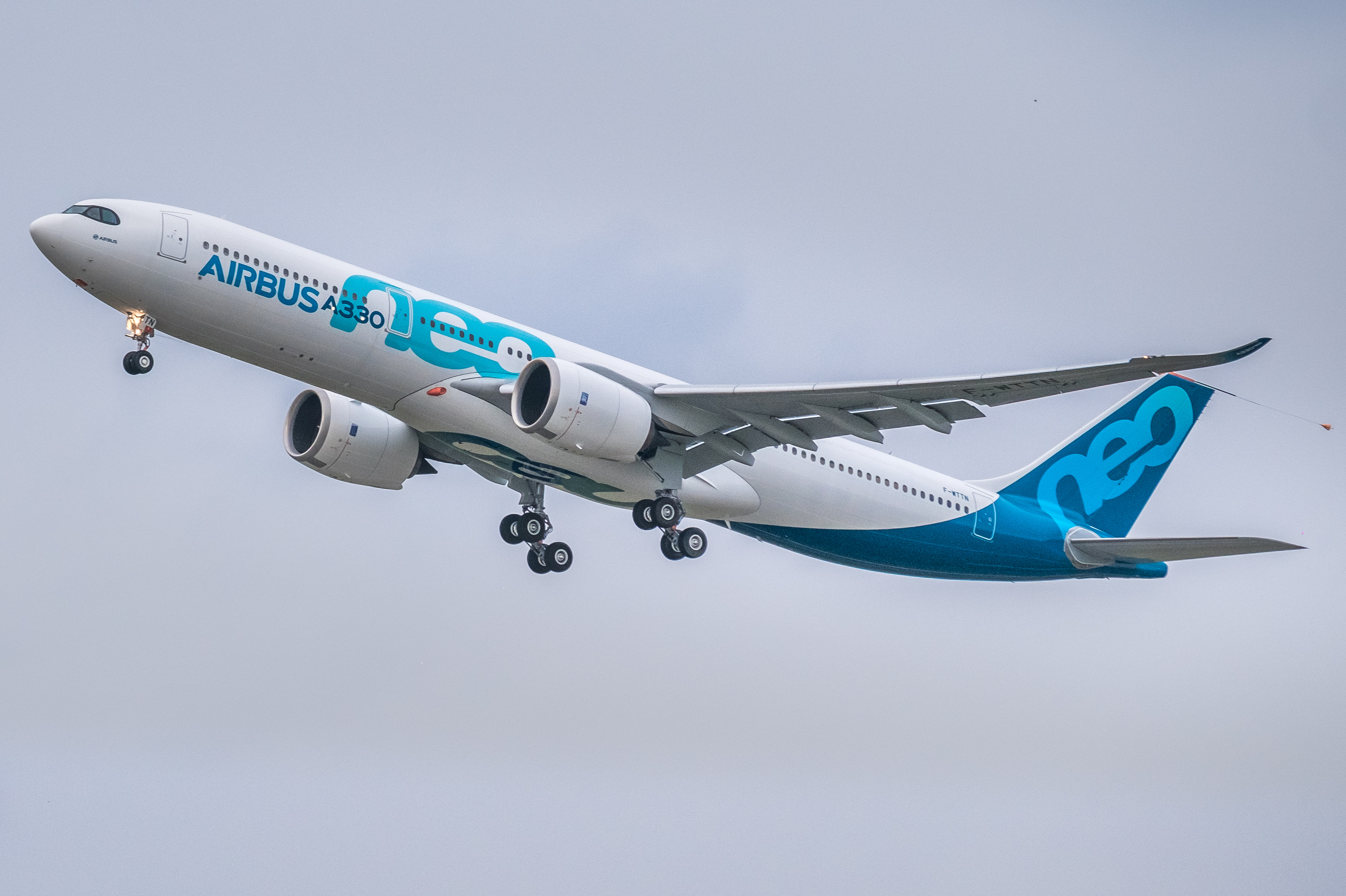
First flight of A330-900 on 19 October 2017

The A330neo ("neo" for "New Engine Option") is a development from the initial A330 (now A330ceo — "Current Engine Option"). A new version with modern engines developed for the Boeing 787 was called for by owners of the current A330. It was launched in July 2014 at the Farnborough Airshow, promising 14% better fuel economy per seat. It will use the larger Rolls-Royce Trent 7000 exclusively. Its two versions are based on the A330-200 and -300: the -800 should cover 8,100 nmi (15,000 km; 9,320 mi) with 257 passengers while the -900 should cover 7,350 nmi (13,610 km; 8,460 mi) with 287 passengers. The -900 made its first flight on 19 October 2017, received its EASA type certificate on 26 September 2018, and was first delivered to TAP Air Portugal on 26 November. The -800 made its first flight on 6 November 2018, aiming for a mid 2019 type certification and delivery in the first half of 2020.

=== Production ===
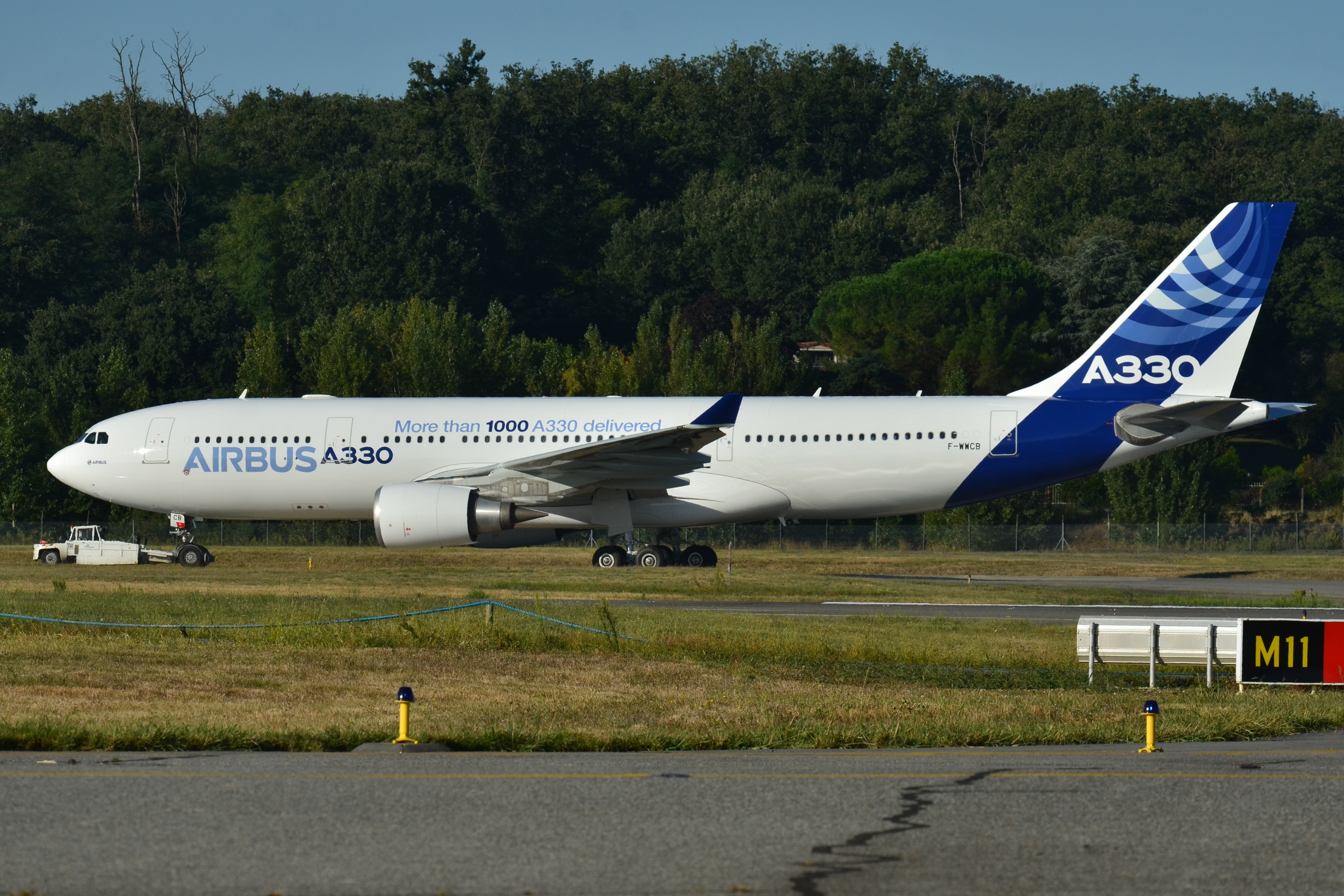
The 1,000th A330 was delivered on 19 July 2013.

Airbus announced in February 2011 that it intended to raise production rates from seven-and-a-half/eight per month to nine per month in 2012, and ten in 2013. Production increased to ten aircraft per month in April 2013, the highest for any Airbus wide-body aircraft. In 2012, Airbus expected the A330 to continue selling until at least 2020, with the A350-900 expected to replace the A330-300.

On 19 July 2013, Airbus delivered its 1000th A330 to Cathay Pacific. The A330 became the first Airbus wide-body airliner to reach 1,000 deliveries, and the fourth wide-body to achieve the milestone after the Boeing 747, 767, and 777. As of May 2025, a total of 1,479 A330ceos had been ordered, with 1,472 delivered.

In December 2014, Airbus announced that it would reduce A330 production to nine aircraft per month from ten, because of falling orders. Airbus did not rule out any further production cuts. The announcement led to an immediate drop in Airbus Group's stock price because the company derived a significant percentage of its cash flow and net profit from the A330 program; the A330's financial impact was magnified amid problems in the A350 and A380 programs. In February 2015, Airbus announced another production rate cut to six aircraft per month in the first quarter of 2016. This would extend A330ceo production to July 2017, allowing for a smooth transition to A330neo production, which was set to start in spring 2017. In February 2016, Airbus announced it would re-increase the production rate from 6 to 7 per month, in response to new A330 orders.

In April 2018, as a result of weakening demand, Airbus announced further rate cuts to 4-5 aircraft a month (50 per year) in 2019. In 2019, Airbus delivered 53 A330s (including 41 A330neos), including some delayed from 2018, and was set to reach a rate of 40 per year, to reflect softer demand for wide-bodies, as the backlog reached 331 (including 293 A330neos) − or 8.3 years' worth of production.

The last A330-200 was delivered to OpenSkies (operating for LEVEL) on 1 October 2019, registered F-HLVN (subsequently reregistered EC-NNH in 2021). The last A330-300 built was registered EI-EIN and flown to Brussels Airport on 28 February 2020; Aer Lingus took delivery on 4 March 2020. At the time, four completed A330-300s for troubled Hong Kong Airlines were still undelivered. A330 MRTT/KC-30B and BelugaXL production both continue alongside that of the A330neo.

The COVID-19 pandemic reduced demand for new jets in 2020, and Airbus cut its monthly production from 4.5 to 2 A330s. In September 2020, the A330 reached a milestone of 1500 deliveries, Airbus's first twin-aisle aircraft to do so, and the third overall after the Boeing 747 and 777.

== Design ==
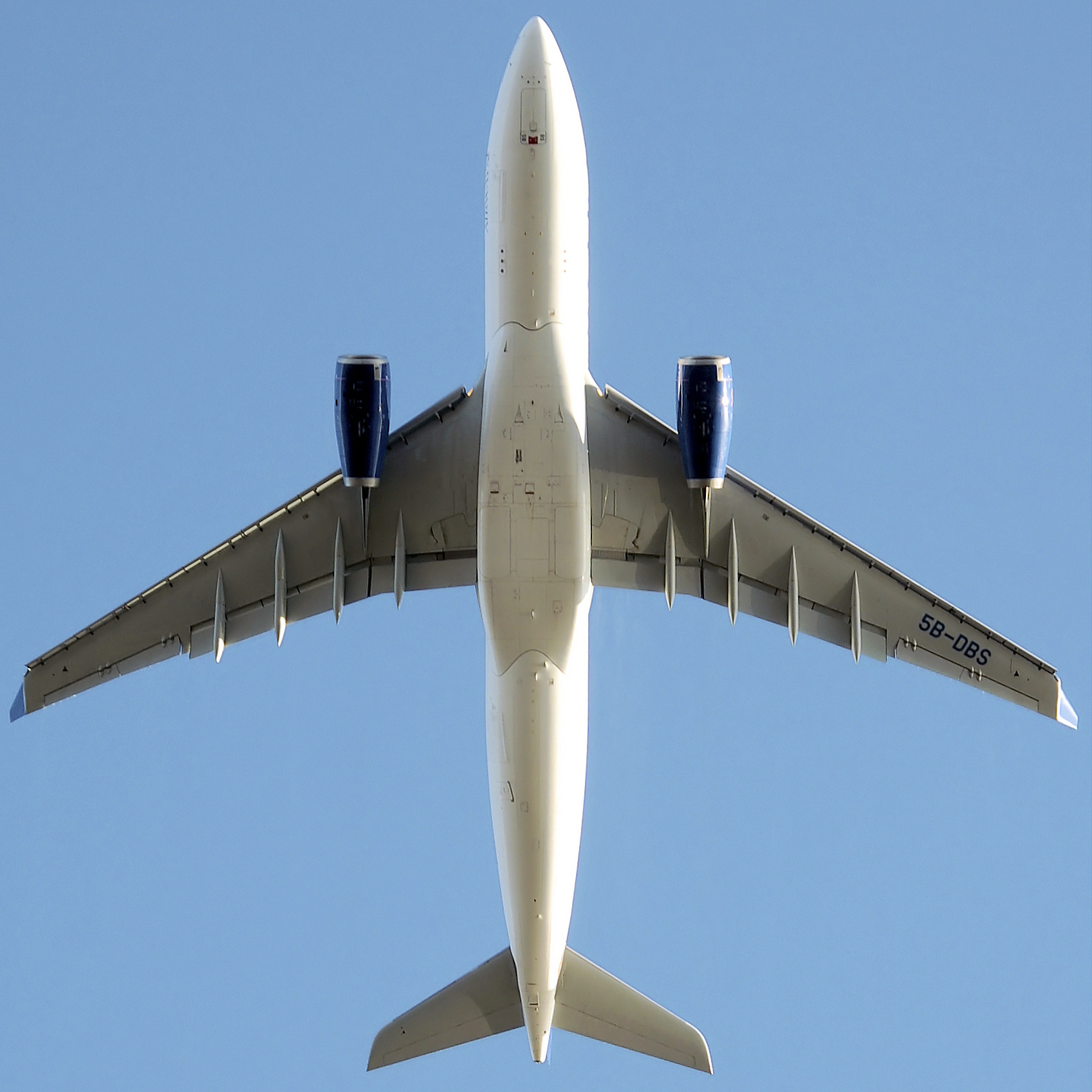
A330-200 planform view, showing its 10.06 wing aspect ratio and 30° wing sweep

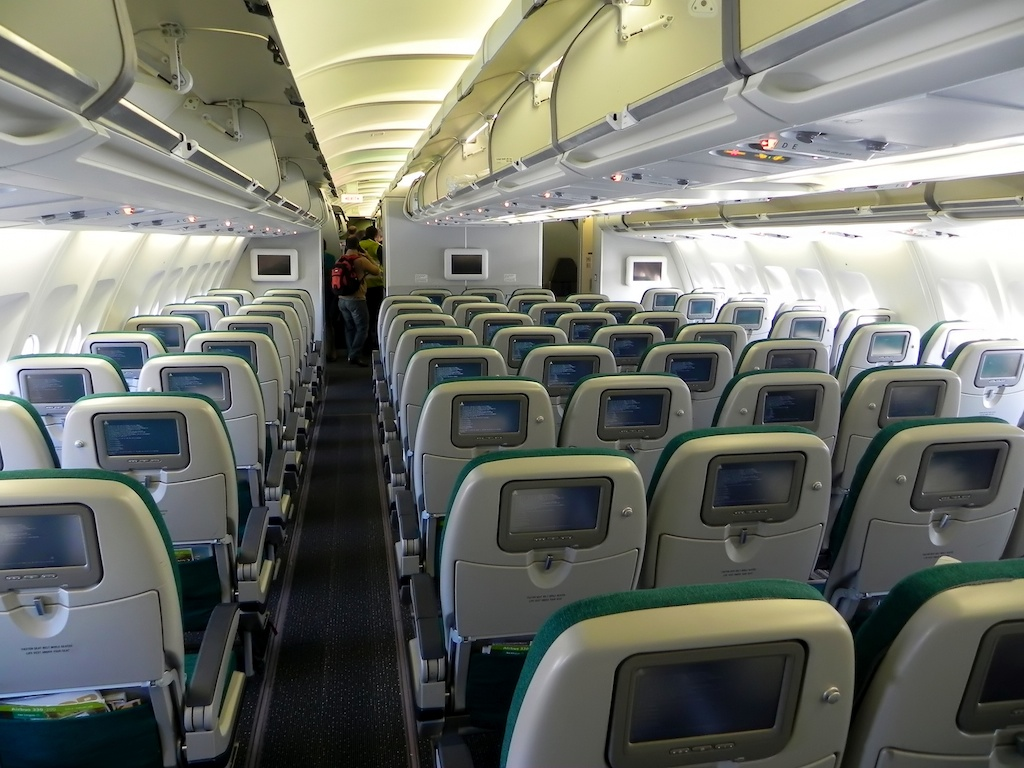
Eight-abreast, 2–4–2 economy class

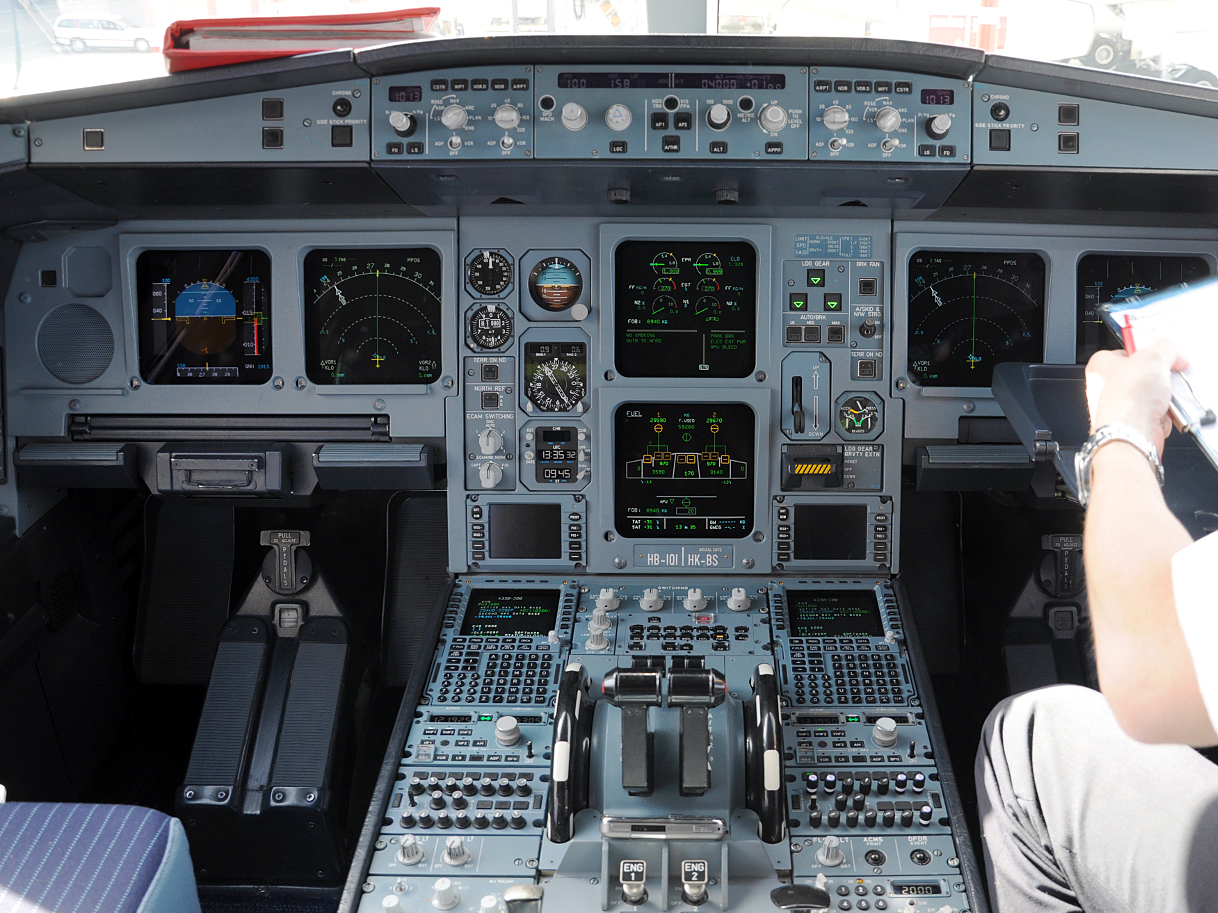
The fly-by-wire A330/A340 retains the A320's six-screen glass cockpit.

The A330 is a medium-size, wide-body aircraft, with two engines suspended on pylons under the wings. A two-wheel nose undercarriage and two four-wheel bogie main legs built by Messier-Dowty support the aircraft on the ground. Its MTOW grew from 212 tonnes (467,000 lb) at introduction to 242 tonnes (534,000 lb) in 2015, enhancing its payload-range performance. John Leahy states that originally the A330 was intentionally being held down in takeoff weight and performance in order to avoid overlapping with the A340.

The airframe of the A330 features a low-wing cantilever monoplane with a wing virtually identical to that of the A340-200/300. On the A330-300, one engine is installed at the inboard pylon while the outboard pylon position is not used; for the A340-300, both engine pylons are used, which allows the A340-300 wing to sustain a higher (wing-limited) MTOW. This is as the A340's two engines at each wing provide a more equal force distribution (engine weight) over the wing, while also the total engine weight counteracting moment is located more outboard with more engine weight located further outboard on the wing, hence the wing root bending moment with equal TOW is less on the A340-300 than on the A330-300. The A340 has a longer range and heavier payload, while the A330 has better fuel economy over the same distance.

The wings were designed and manufactured by BAe, which developed a long slender wing with a very high aspect ratio to provide high aerodynamic efficiency. (Note: The higher the aspect ratio, the greater the aerodynamic efficiency.) The wing is swept back at 30 degrees and, along with other design features, allows a maximum operating Mach number of 0.86. To reach a long span and high aspect ratio without a large weight penalty, the wing has relatively high thickness-to-chord ratio of 11.8% or 12.8%. (Note: This is the thickness to chord ratio of the early Airbus A340 variants, which share the same wing with the A330.) Jet airliners have thickness-to-chord ratios ranging from 9.4% (MD-11 or Boeing 747) to 13% (Avro RJ or 737 Classic). Each wing also has a 2.74 m (9 ft 0 in) tall winglet instead of the wingtip fences found on earlier Airbus aircraft.

The shared wing design with the A340 allowed the A330 to incorporate aerodynamic features developed for the former aircraft. The failure of International Aero Engines' radical ultra-high-bypass V2500 "SuperFan", which had promised around 15 per cent fuel burn reduction for the A340, led to multiple enhancements including wing upgrades to compensate. Originally designed with a 56 m (180 ft) span, the wing was later extended to 58.6 m (190 ft) and finally to 60.3 m (200 ft). At 60.3 m (200 ft), the wingspan is similar to that of the larger Boeing 747-200, but with 35 per cent less wing area.

The A330 and A340 fuselage is based on that of the Airbus A300-600, with many common parts, and has the same external and cabin width: 5.64 m (19 ft) and 5.26 m (17 ft). Typical seating arrangements are 2–2–2 six-abreast in business class and 2–4–2 eight-abreast in economy class. The fin, rudder, elevators, horizontal tail plane (used as fuel tank), flaps, ailerons, and spoilers are made of composite materials, making 10% of the structure weight. When necessary, the A330 uses the Honeywell 331–350C auxiliary power unit (APU) to provide pneumatics and electrical power.

The A330 shares the same glass cockpit flight deck layout as the A320 and the A340, featuring electronic instrument displays rather than mechanical gauges. Instead of a conventional control yoke, the flight deck features side-stick controls, six main displays, and the Electronic Flight Instrument System (EFIS), which covers navigation and flight displays, as well as the Electronic Centralised Aircraft Monitor (ECAM). Apart from the flight deck, the A330 also has the fly-by-wire system common to the A320 family, the A340, the A350, and the A380. It also features three primary and two secondary flight control systems, as well as a flight envelope limit protection system which prevents manoeuvres from exceeding the aircraft's aerodynamic and structural limits.

== Operational history ==
Airbus intended the A330 to compete in the Extended-range Twin-engine Operation Performance Standards (ETOPS) market, specifically with the Boeing 767. (ETOPS is a standard that allows longer range flights away from a diversion airport for aircraft that have met special design and testing standards.) Instead of the "ETOPS out of the box" or "Early ETOPS" approach taken by Boeing with its 777, (Note: This meant that the Boeing 777 was certified for 180-minutes ETOPS from the first day of service. As a result, the aircraft could be 180 minutes (3 hours) of flying time from a diversionary airport during transoceanic services.) Airbus gradually increased ETOPS approval on the A330 using in-service experience. Airbus suggested that the A340 and the A330 were essentially identical except for their engine number, and that the A340's experience could be applied to the A330's ETOPS approval. The plans were for all three engine types to enter service with 90-minute approval, before increasing to 120 minutes after the total A330 fleet accumulated 25,000 flight hours, and then to 180 minutes after 50,000 flight hours, in 1995. (Note: After a total of 25,000 airborne hours, the A330 would be allowed a maximum of 120 minutes (2 hours) of flight time from a diversionary airport. After 50,000 hours, the limit would be raised to 180 minutes (3 hours).) Aer Lingus and Cathay Pacific were two important airlines assisting Airbus in this endeavour by building up in-service flight hours on over-ocean flights. In November 2009, the A330 became the first aircraft to receive ETOPS–240 approval, which has since been offered by Airbus as an option.

As of September 2026, the global A330 fleet of 1,401 aircraft had 13.5 years average aircraft age (~4.0 years for A330neo), opened more than 490 new city pairs since the launch of the Boeing 787 in 2011, and accumulated more than 75 million flight hours (~2.6 million for A330neo) since its entry into service with 99.0% (≈ 99.33% for A330neo) operational reliability in the last 3 months.

== Variants ==
With the launch of Airbus A330neo, the existing members of the Airbus A330 family (A330-200, 200F, 300, and MRTT) received the Airbus A330ceo ("current engine option") name.

=== A330ceo ===
==== A330-200 ====
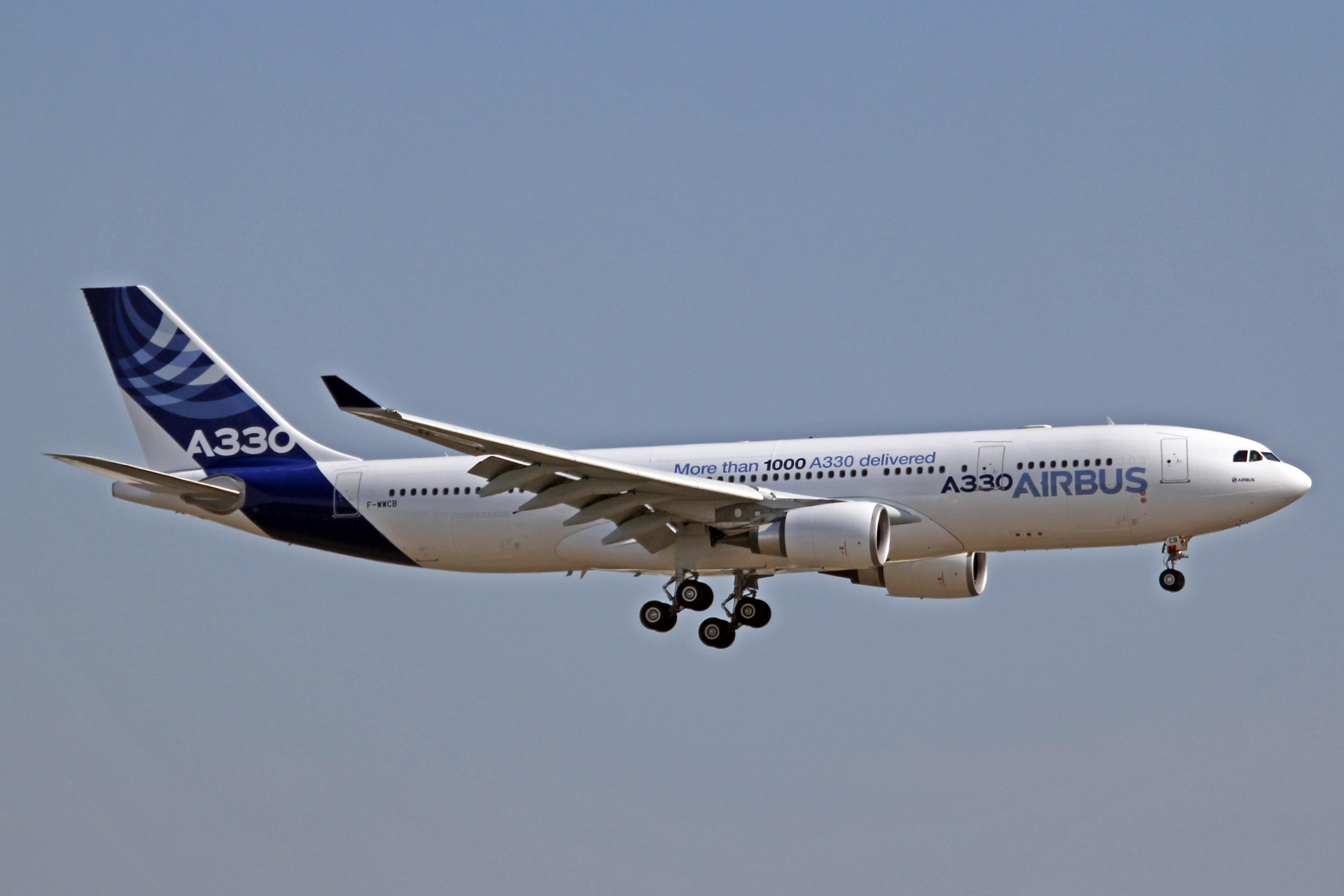
The -200 is 4.85 m (15.9 ft) shorter than the -300.

The A330-200 is a shortened, longer-range variant, which entered service in 1998 with Canada 3000. The typical range with 253 passengers in a three-class configuration is 13,400 km (7,240 nmi; 8,330 mi). The A330-200 is ten fuselage frames shorter than the original −300, with a length of 58.82 m (193 ft 0 in). To compensate for the smaller moment arm of the shorter fuselage, the vertical stabiliser height of the -200 was increased by 104 cm (40.9 in). The −200's wing was also modified; structural strengthening of the wing allowed the maximum takeoff weight of the −200 to be increased to 229.8 tonnes (507,000 lb). The −200 is offered with three engine types similar to those found on the −300, namely the General Electric CF6-80E, Pratt & Whitney PW4000, or Rolls-Royce Trent 700. Airbus also boosted fuel capacity to 139,090 L (36,740 US gal; 30,600 imp gal) by adding the centre section fuel tank, standard in the A340.

A new vertical stabiliser was introduced in 2004 beginning with MSN 555. This newer fin is shorter in height by 50 cm (20 in) and was derived from the design of the vertical stabiliser of the A340-500 and -600, later becoming standard on all new A330-200s.

In 2008, Airbus released plans for a higher gross weight version of the A330-200 to more effectively compete against the Boeing 787 Dreamliner. The new-build A330-200HGW had a 5-tonne increase in Maximum Takeoff Weight, allowing a 560-kilometre (300 nmi; 350 mi) range increase and a 3.4-tonne (7,500 lb) payload increase. Korean Air became the first customer on 27 February 2009 with an order for six −200HGWs. Deliveries of the first aircraft started in 2010.

In mid 2012, Airbus proposed another version of the −200 with the maximum gross weight increased by 2 t (4,400 lb) to 240 t (530,000 lb). This version had its range extended by 270 nmi (500 km; 310 mi) and carried 2.5 t (5,500 lb) more payload. It saw engine and aerodynamic improvements reducing its fuel burn by about 2%. In November 2012, it was announced that the gross weight was to be further increased to 242 t (534,000 lb) with the range extended by 350 nmi (650 km; 400 mi) over the 238 t (525,000 lb) version. It was certified by the EASA on 8 September 2015.

As a result of its vastly increased range while still maintaining the fuel efficiency of the larger A330-300, the A330-200 came into internal competition with the initial A340 variants; the A330-200 proved much more popular than the A340-200 which carried fewer passengers and its only advantage was an extra range of 2,000 miles (3,200 km) that most airline routes did not need; the A330-200 managed to approach (though not match) the range of the A340-300 which did have a higher passenger capacity. This in turn led to Airbus making significant changes for subsequent A340 variants for significantly increased capacity and further range to distinguish the resultant A340-500/600 from the A330 family. The A330−200 competes with the Boeing 767-400ER and 787-8.

In 1998, a newly delivered -200 was valued US$94 million, rose over $100 million in 2005 but lowered at almost $75 million in 2019 as the market favours the -300 and the A330neo. The 2018 list price was US$238.5 million. As of April 2024, 661 of the −200 had been ordered, 656 of which had been delivered, with 572 aircraft in operation.

==== A330-200F ====
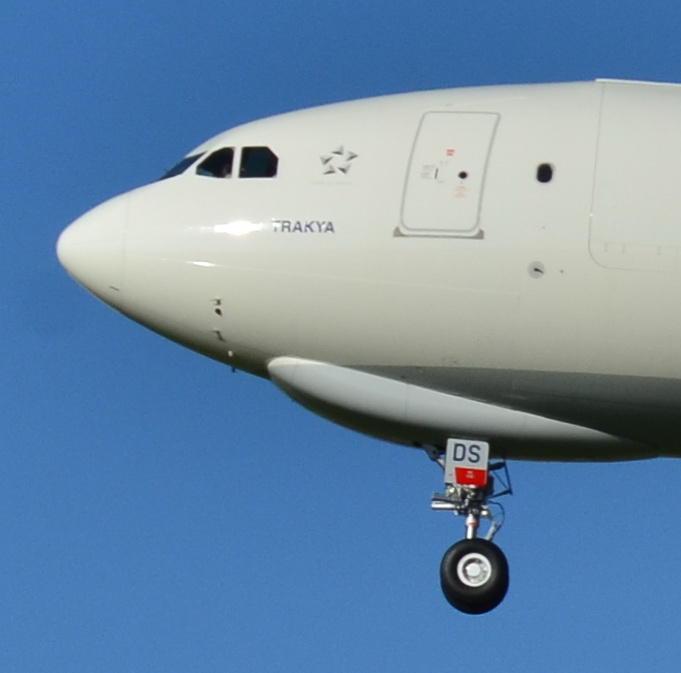
The bulge under the A330-200F nose corrects the inherent nose-down attitude of passenger versions.

The A330-200F is an all-cargo derivative of the A330-200 capable of carrying 65 t (140,000 lb) over 7,400 km (4,000 nmi; 4,600 mi) or 70 t (150,000 lb) up to 5,900 km (3,200 nmi; 3,700 mi). To overcome the standard A330's nose-down body angle on the ground, the A330F uses a revised nose undercarriage layout to provide a level deck during cargo loading. The normal A330-200 undercarriage is used, but its attachment points are lower in the fuselage, thus requiring a distinctive blister fairing on the nose to accommodate the retracted nose gear. Power is provided by two Pratt & Whitney PW4000 or Rolls-Royce Trent 700 engines. General Electric does not offer an engine for the A330-200F.

Unlike the passenger variant, the A330-200F does not offer a centre tank as a standard equipment in order to save the weight of the inerting system, reducing fuel capacity by 41,560 litres. However, it is still offered as an optional equipment per customer needs.

As of December 2020, Airbus had delivered 38 aircraft with no outstanding orders. The list price is $241.7 million. As well as new-build freighters, Airbus has proposed passenger-to-freighter conversions of existing −200 airliners. The A330-200F is sized between the 767-300F and 777F, but trails both Boeing models in orders and deliveries.

==== A330-300 ====
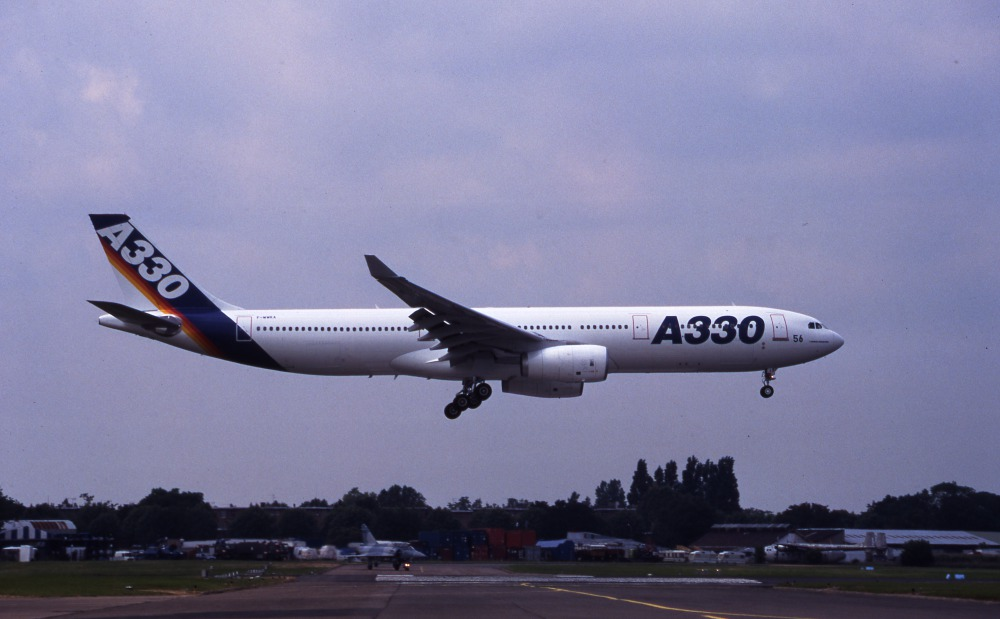
The first A330-300 prototype flew in 1995; it later flew with Cathay Pacific and its affiliate Cathay Dragon until retirement in 2020.

Powered by two General Electric CF6-80E1, Pratt & Whitney PW4000, or Rolls-Royce Trent 700 engines, the 63.69 m (208 ft 11 in) long −300 has a range of 11,750 km (6,340 nmi; 7,300 mi), typically carries 277 passengers with a 440 exit limit and 32 LD3 containers. It received European and American certification on 21 October 1993 after 420 test flights over 1,100 hours. The −300 entered service on 16 January 1994. The A330-300 is based on a stretched A300 fuselage but with new wings, stabilisers and fly-by-wire systems.

In 2010, Airbus offered a new version of the −300 with the maximum gross weight increased by 2 tonnes to 235 tonnes. This enabled 120 nmi (220 km; 140 mi) extension of the range as well as 1.2-tonne increase in payload. In mid 2012, Airbus proposed another increase of the maximum gross weight to 240 tonnes. It is planned to be implemented by mid 2015. This −300 version will have the range extended by 400 nmi (740 km; 460 mi) and will carry 5 tonnes more payload. It will include engine and aerodynamic improvements reducing its fuel burn by about 2%. In November 2012, it was further announced that the gross weight will increase from 235 to 242 tonnes, and the range will increase by 500 nmi (926 km; 575 mi) to 6,100 nmi (11,300 km; 7,020 mi). Airbus is also planning to activate the central fuel tank for the first time for the −300 model.

As of December 2020, a total of 779 of the -300 had been ordered, 771 of which had been delivered, with 742 in operation. The 2015 list price is $264 million. The closest competitors have been the Boeing 777-200/200ER and 787-9.

==== A330-300HGW ====
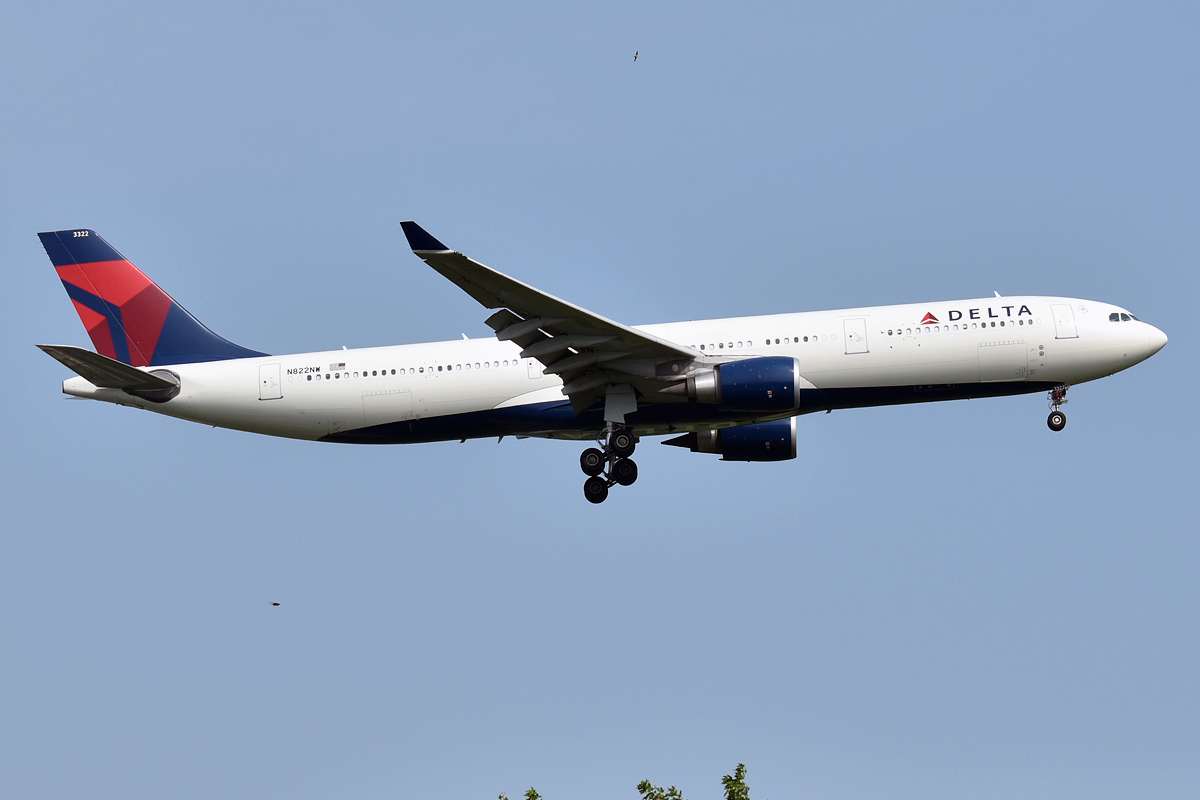
The first 242 t (534,000 lb) A330-300 was delivered to Delta Air Lines in May 2015.

In 2000, it was reported that Airbus was studying an A330-300 version with a higher gross weight. It was named A330-300HGW and had a takeoff weight of 240 tonnes (530,000 lb), 7 tonnes (15,000 lb) greater than the -300's weight at the time. The version would have a strengthened wing and additional fuel capacity from a 41,600-litre (11,000 US gal; 9,150 imp gal) centre section fuel tank. The A330-300HGW's range was increased to over 11,000 km (5,940 nmi; 6,840 mi). Among those that showed interest was leasing company ILFC, which sought airliners that could fly from the US West Coast to Europe.

Power was to be supplied by all three engines offered to A330-200 and A330-300 with lower gross weight. Airbus also considered using the new Engine Alliance GP7000 engine for the A330-300HGW, which would have been the engine's first twinjet application. The −300HGW was to enter airline service in 2004. However, the -300HGW programme was not launched and quietly disappeared.

The 240-tonne A330 reappeared years later when Airbus announced at the 2012 Farnborough Airshow that it would be an available option for both the A330-300 and the A330-200. In November 2012, the maximum take off weight was further increased to 242 tonnes. The package became available starting from MSN 1627. The first of these aircraft was delivered to Delta Air Lines on 28 May 2015.

==== A330 Regional ====
In September 2013, Airbus announced a version of the A330-300, named A330 Regional or A330-300 Regional. The A330 Regional has seating for up to around 400 passengers, with reduced engine thrust, reduced maximum takeoff weight of 199 t (439,000 lb), and reduced range of 2,700 nautical miles (5,000 km; 3,110 mi). It is said that the maximum takeoff weight of these aircraft is an "easy upgrade to 242 t (534,000 lb)", which is the extended range version with range of 6,350 nmi (11,800 km; 7,310 mi). It is said to provide up to 26% lower operating costs than the longer range version A330-300.

On 18 August 2016, Airbus delivered the first A330 Regional to Saudia.

==== A330P2F ====
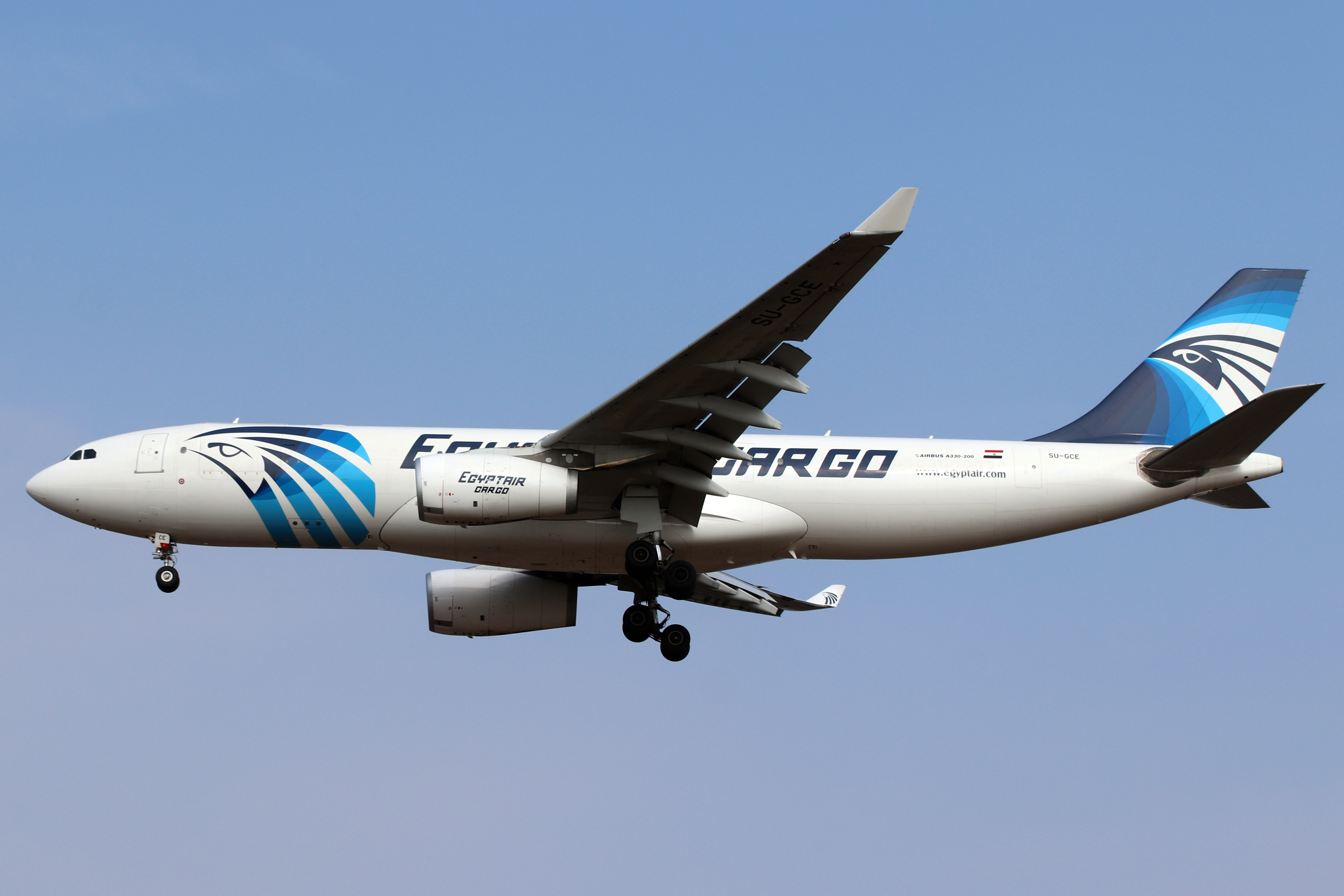
The first A330-200P2F was delivered to Egyptair Cargo on 3 August 2018, with no bulge at the front of the aircraft like the A330-200F.

The A330P2F (Passenger-to-Freighter) conversion programme was launched at the 2012 Singapore Airshow with the support of Airbus, their Dresden-based Elbe Flugzeugwerke (EFW) joint venture and Singapore-based engineering firm ST Aerospace. Targeting a 2016 introduction, Airbus then estimated a market requirement for 2,700 freighters over 20 years, including 900 conversions, with half of these being mid-sized aircraft like the A330. The aircraft will be converted mainly at EFW's facility in Dresden, Germany, and at a new conversion site in Shanghai, China.

The A330-300P2F, targeted towards operators with lower density express delivery and e-commerce loads, can carry up to 62 t (137,000 lb) over 3,650 nmi (6,760 km; 4,200 mi). Following flight tests in October 2017 and the awarding of the EASA supplemental type certificate (STC) in November, the first A330-300P2F was delivered to DHL on 1 December.

The A330-200P2F can carry 61 t (134,000 lb) over 4,250 nmi (7,870 km; 4,890 mi). Following flight tests in June 2018, and the awarding of the EASA STC in July, the first was delivered to Egyptair Cargo on 3 August 2018.

The P2F version of the A330 retains the passenger aircraft's geometry and incorporates a powered cargo loading system to enable pallets to be moved "uphill" on the main cargo deck, and therefore does not have the distinctive nose blister, or "bulge", of the factory delivered A330-200F.

On 3 March 2022, Air Transport Services Group, an air freighter lessor, committed to acquiring 29 Airbus A330-300P2F with deliveries in the 2023 to 2027 timeframe.

=== A330neo ===
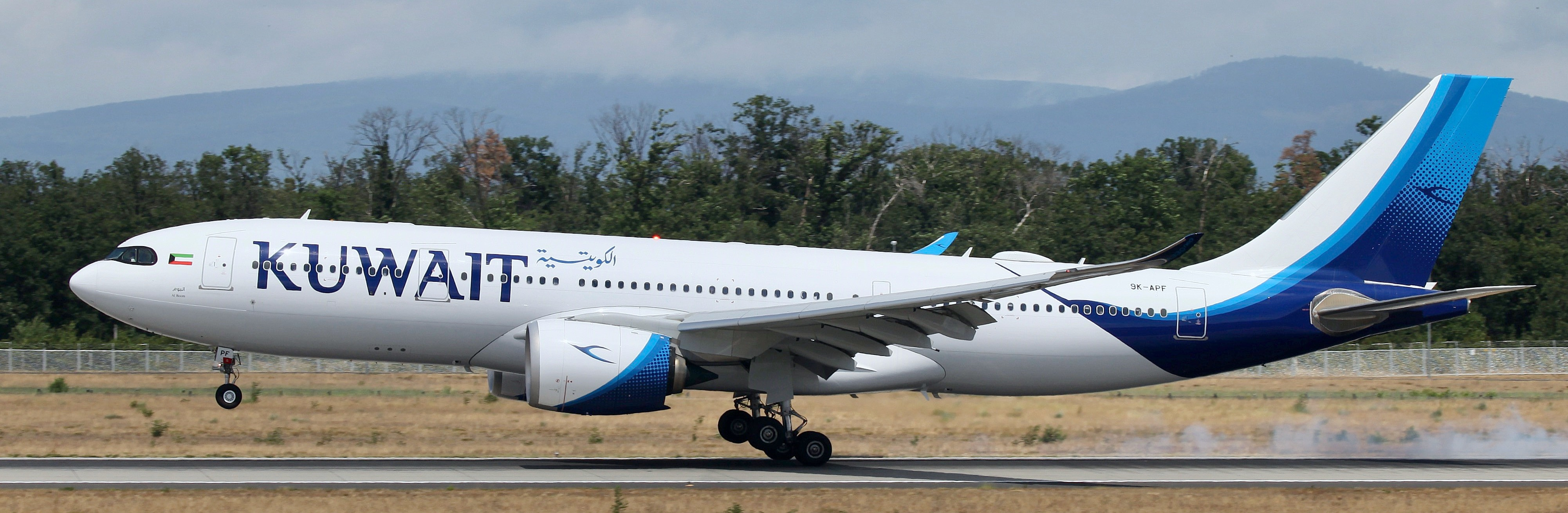
An A330-800 of launch operator Kuwait Airways at Frankfurt Airport in 2022

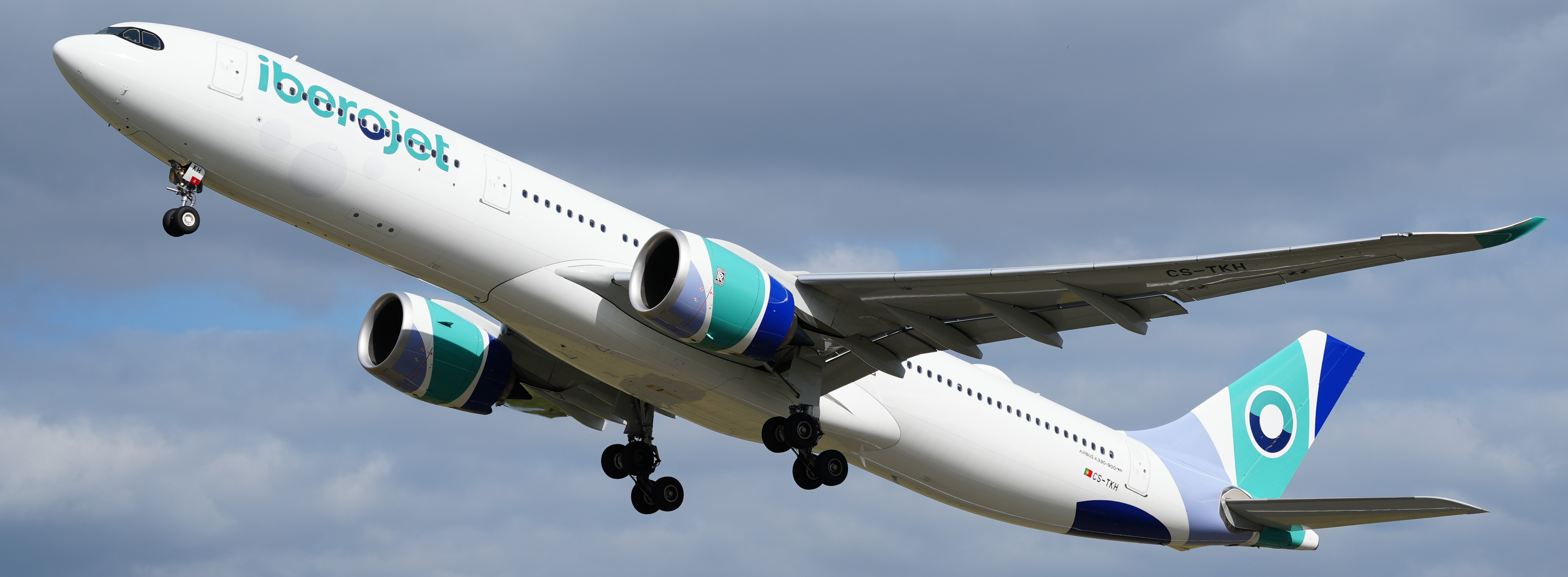
An Iberojet A330-900 in 2022

==== A330-800 ====
The Airbus A330-800 is based on the A330-200, with, cabin modifications, larger Trent 7000 engines and aerodynamic improvements. The A330-800s maiden flight took place on 6 November 2018. The first two A330-800s were delivered to their launch customer Kuwait Airways in October 2020.

==== A330-900 ====
The Airbus A330-900 maintains the A330-300's fuselage dimensions with ten more seats thanks to cabin optimisation. With modern Trent 7000 engines and redesigned winglets, it should burn 14% less fuel per seat than the A330-300 over a distance of 4,000 nmi (7,400 km; 4,600 mi). It travels 7,350 nmi (13,610 km; 8,460 mi) with 287 passengers in a standard configuration. The A330-900 made its maiden flight on 19 October 2017 and received its EASA type certificate on 26 September 2018; it entered service with its launch customer, TAP Air Portugal, on 15 December 2018.

=== BelugaXL (large cargo freighter) ===
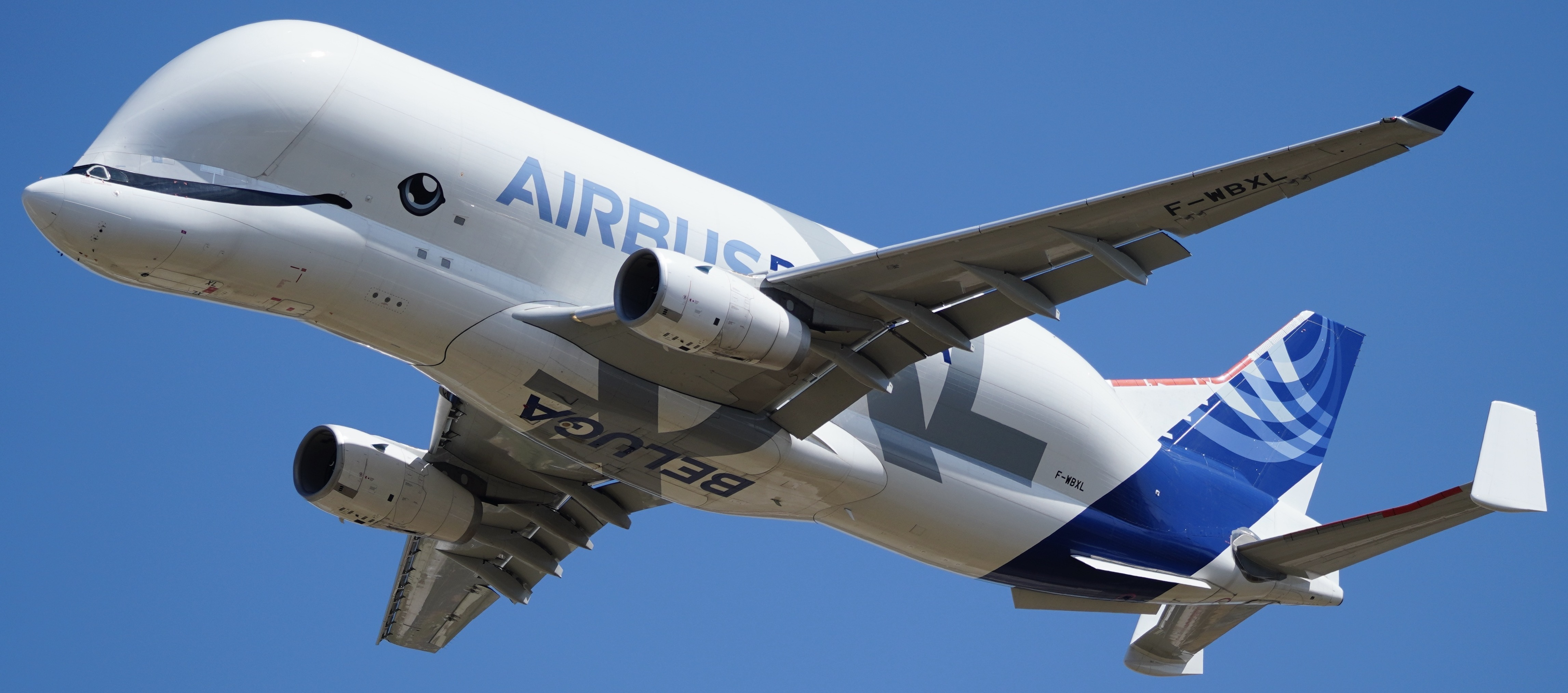
A BelugaXL in 2022

Airbus started design of a replacement aircraft for the Beluga in November 2014. The BelugaXL A330-743L is based on the Airbus A330, and has 30% more space than its predecessor. Like the Beluga, the BelugaXL features an extension on its fuselage top, but can accommodate two Airbus A350 wings instead of one. The new aircraft rolled out of the assembly line on 4 January 2018, making its maiden flight on 19 July 2018. It began ferrying cargo between different Airbus factories in January 2020.

=== Corporate jet variants ===
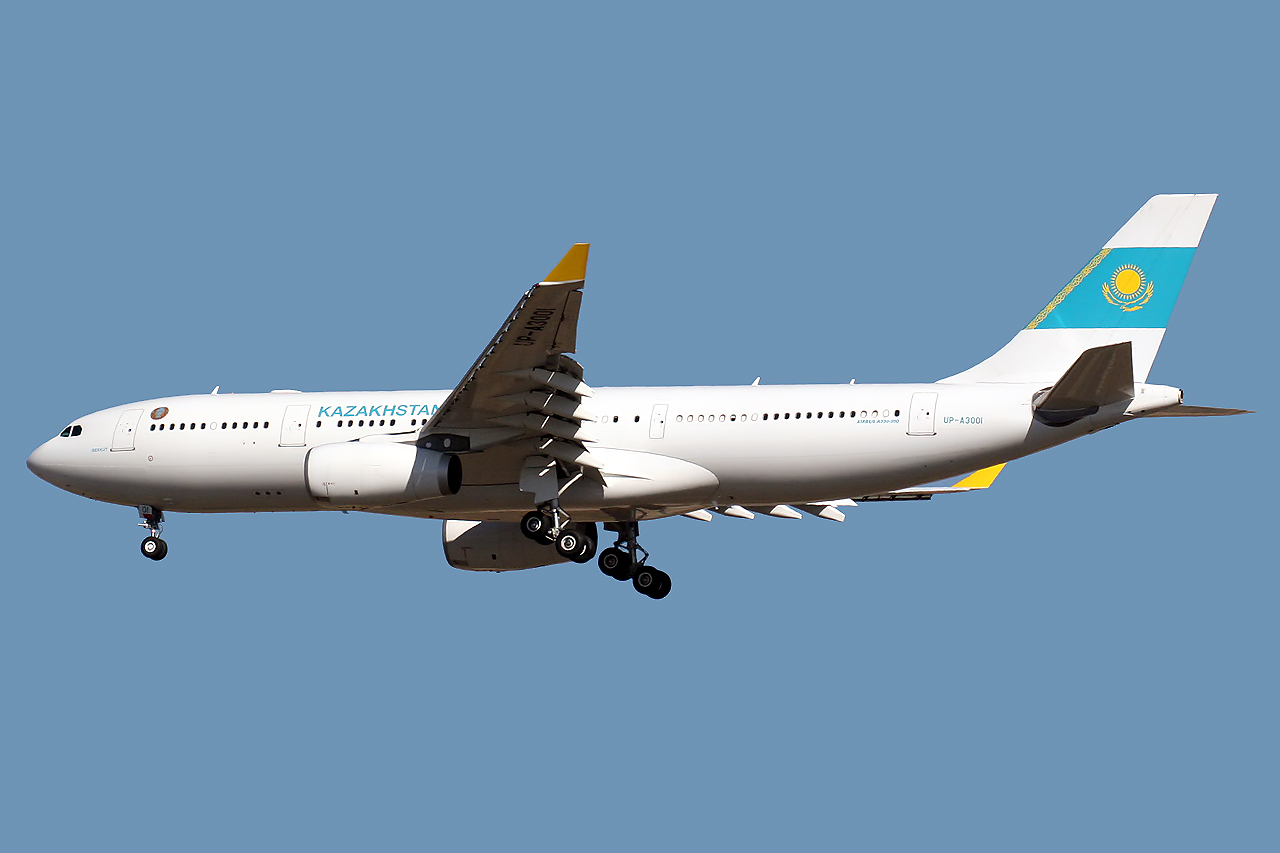
An ACJ-configured A330-200 serving the President of Kazakhstan in 2014.

==== ACJ330 ====
The A330-200 is available as an ultra-long-range Airbus Corporate Jet known as the A330-200 Prestige, with a range of 15,400 km (8,300 nmi; 9,600 mi) and a capacity of 50 passengers.

==== ACJ330neo ====
A corporate jet version of the new A330neo capable of flying 25 passengers 19,260 km (10,400 nmi; 11,970 mi) or 21 hours, enough to fly non-stop from Europe to Australia.

=== Military variants ===
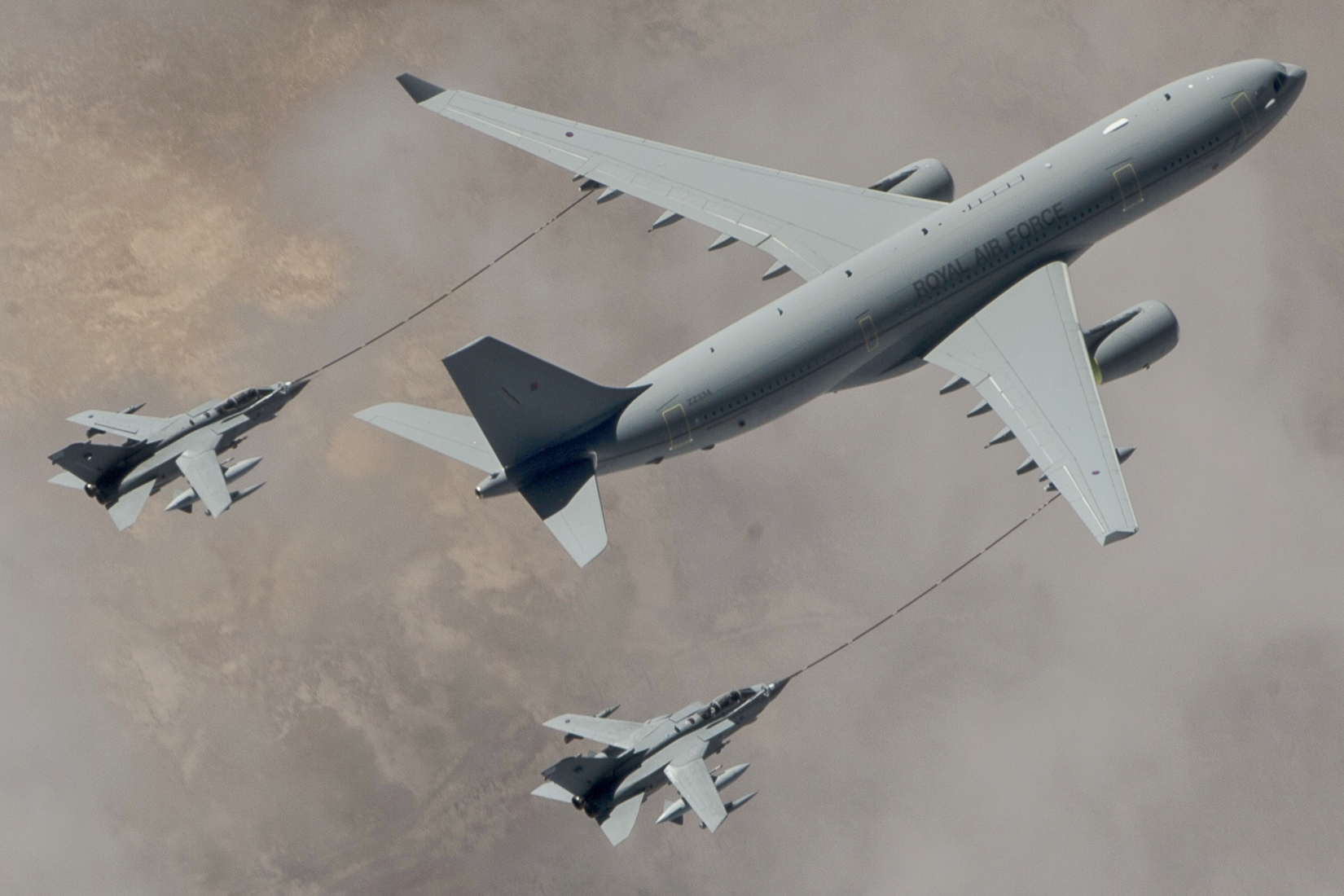
Airbus A330 MRTT of the RAF refueling two Tornado fighter jets over Iraq in 2015

==== Airbus A330 MRTT ====
The Airbus A330 MRTT is the Multi-Role Transport and Tanker (MRTT) version of the A330-200, designed for aerial refuelling and strategic transport. As of November 2020, approximately 60 orders had been placed for the A330 MRTT by air forces of thirteen countries.

==== EADS/Northrop Grumman KC-45 ====
The EADS/Northrop Grumman KC-45 was a proposed version of the A330 MRTT for the United States Air Force (USAF)'s KC-X aerial refuelling programme. In February 2008, the USAF selected the aircraft to replace the Boeing KC-135 Stratotanker. The replacement process was mired in controversy, instances of corruption, and allegations of favouritism. In July 2010, EADS submitted a tanker bid to the USAF without Northrop Grumman as a partner. However, on 24 February 2011, the USAF picked the Boeing KC-767 proposal, later named KC-46, as the winner because of its lower cost.

== Operators ==
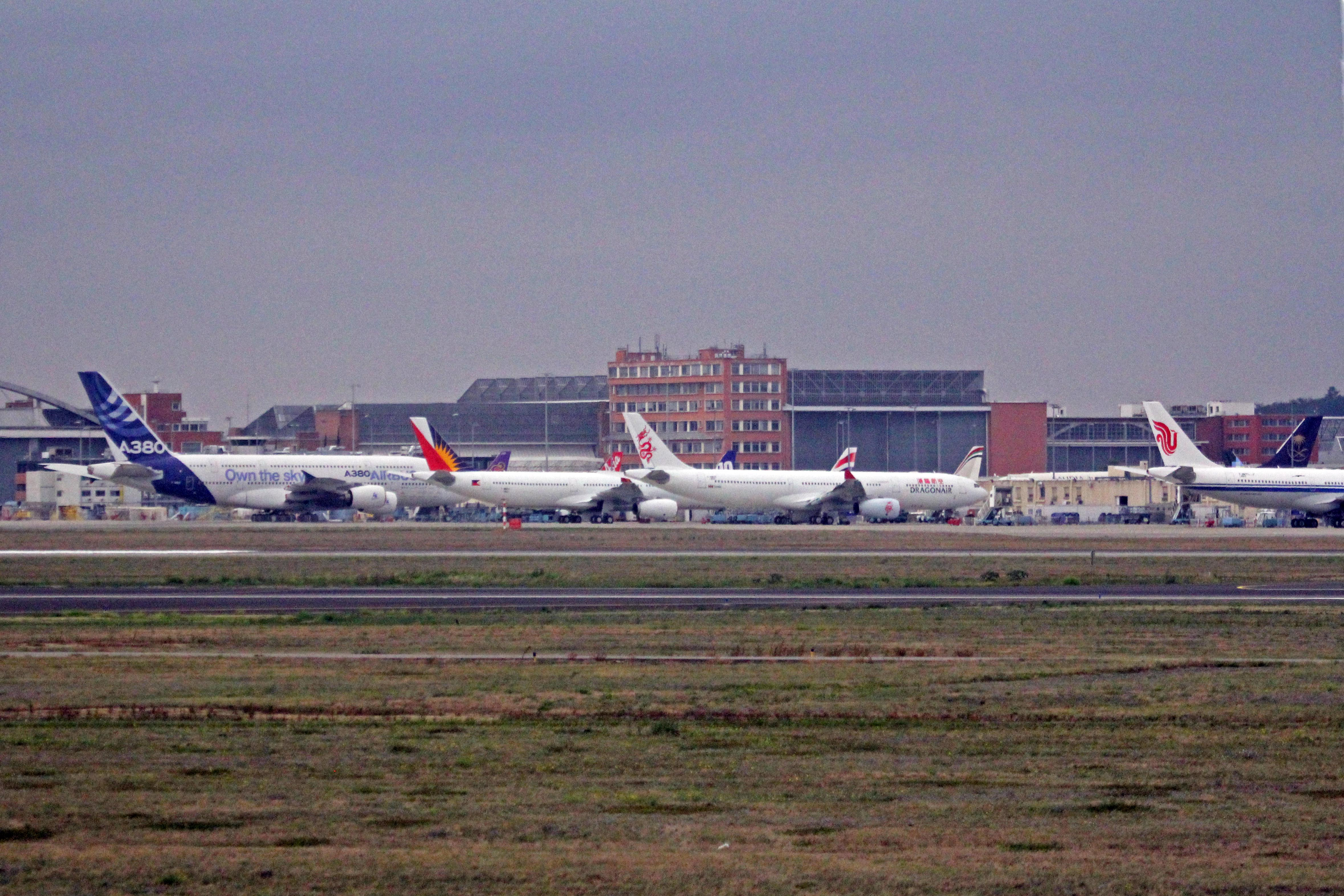
Toulouse–Blagnac, the final assembly line of the A330, in 2013

As of October 2026, a total of 1,403 A330 family aircraft, comprising 475 A330-200s, 38 -200Fs, 687 -300s, 8 -800s and 195 -900s, are in revenue service with 150 operators. The five largest operators were Delta Air Lines (81), Turkish Airlines (60), China Eastern Airlines (56), Air China (43) and Cathay Pacific (43).

By 2012, the 830 A330s in service with over 90 operators had accumulated five million revenue flights and 20 million flight hours, with a dispatch reliability above 99%. In November 2017, 1,190 were transporting passengers with 106 airlines (the top 29 operated two-thirds of the fleet), consisting of 530 -200s and 660 A330-300s, mainly high-gross-weight, with 36 original shorter-range A330-300s, half of them built since January 2010. Its average sector is 2,000 nmi (3,700 km; 2,300 mi); the longest flight for the -200 was 6,000 nmi (11,000 km; 6,900 mi), from Buenos Aires to Rome, by Aerolíneas Argentinas, and 5,000 nmi (9,300 km; 5,800 mi), from Paris to Reunion, by Corsair and French Blue for the -300. Of operators of at least 5 A330s, 17 have ordered A350-900s, 11 have ordered 787-8/9s, 13 both, 3 have ordered A330neos and 2 both A330neos and A350s; 14 haven't yet decided on a replacement. By August 2019, the A330 was operated between over 400 airports in the world, by more than 120 operators, while its average dispatch reliability was over 99% and annual utilisation up to 6,000 flight hours. The 1,500th unit, an A330-900 (A330neo), was delivered to Delta Air Lines on 21 September 2020. In June 2023, the A330 became the second most delivered wide-body airliner after the Boeing 777. In May 2024, the A330 became the second wide-body airliner after the Boeing 777 to reach 1,600 deliveries.

=== Orders and deliveries ===
As of October 2026, A330 family aircraft orders stood at 2,040 of which 1,678 have been delivered, excluding 2 A330-900 delivered to Air Algerie via Airbus Financial Services.

	Orders		Deliveries														
Type	Total	Backlog	Total	2026	2025	2024	2023	2022	2021	2020	2019	2018	2017	2016	2015	2014	2013
A330-200	667	6	661	1	2	2	3	5	3	5	7	14	16	21	30	28	43
A330-200F	38	0	38	–	–	–	–	–	–	–	–	–	2	3	3	5	8
A330-300	776	0	776	–	–	–	–	4	1	1	5	32	49	42	70	75	57
-- A330ceo --	1,481	6	1,475	1	2	2	3	9	4	6	12	46	67	66	103	108	108
A330-800	13	5	8	–	1	–	–	3	1	3	–	–	–	–	–	–	–
A330-900	546	351	195 (Note: Excluding 2 A330-900 delivered to Air Belgium via Airbus Financial Services which had been aircraft built for cancelled orders)	16	33	32	29	20	11	10	41	3	–	–	–	–	–
-- A330neo --	559	356	203	16	34	32	29	23	12	13	41	3	–	–	–	–	–
(A330 family)	(2,040)	(362)	(1,678)	(17)	(36)	(34)	(32)	(32)	(16)	(19)	(53)	(49)	(67)	(66)	(103)	(108)	(108)

	Deliveries																			
	2012	2011	2010	2009	2008	2007	2006	2005	2004	2003	2002	2001	2000	1999	1998	1997	1996	1995	1994	1993
A330-200	37	40	32	38	49	42	39	29	25	19	36	16	27	40	12	–	–	–	–	–
A330-200F	8	4	5	–	–	–	–	–	–	–	–	–	–	–	–	–	–	–	–	–
A330-300	56	43	50	38	23	26	23	27	22	12	6	19	16	4	11	14	10	30	9	1
-- A330ceo --	101	87	87	76	72	68	62	56	47	31	42	35	43	44	23	14	10	30	9	1
-- A330neo --	–	–	–	–	–	–	–	–	–	–	–	–	–	–	–	–	–	–	–	–
(A330 family)	(101)	(87)	(87)	(76)	(72)	(68)	(62)	(56)	(47)	(31)	(42)	(35)	(43)	(44)	(23)	(14)	(10)	(30)	(9)	(1)

Data as of October 2026

== Accidents and incidents ==
As of June 2024, the Airbus A330 has been involved in 46 aviation accidents and incidents, including 14 hull-losses (10 due to flight related accidents and 4 due to criminal related accidents), for a total of 339 fatalities. The deadliest occurred on 1 June 2009, when Air France Flight 447 crashed into the Atlantic Ocean, killing all 228 people on board.

== Aircraft on display ==
- A former Turkish Airlines A330-300 is preserved at Aircraft Museum Kathmandu in Kathmandu, Nepal. This aircraft was only eight months old when it was written off in a runway excursion at Tribhuvan International Airport. The museum is inside the aircraft, with more than 200 miniature planes inside and aviation artefacts.
- Former Thai Airways A330-300 HS-TEF has been preserved since 2017 as the Airways Land Café at Sida, Nakhon Ratchasima, Thailand.
- Air Diamond Cafe in Chiang Mai, Thailand uses the former Thai Airways A330-300 that first flew on 29 August 1995 at its main premises.
- Former Thai Airways A330-300 has been preserved as "Coffee War" cafe in Chonburi since 2020.

== Specifications ==
Airbus A330 specifications
	A330-200	A330-200F	A330-300
Cockpit crew	Two		
Capacity	246 (36J @ 150 cm + 210Y @ 80 cm)	70,000 kg (150,000 lb)	300 (36J @ 150 cm + 264Y @ 80 cm)
Max seating	406	–	440
Length	58.82 m (192.98 ft)		63.66 m (208.86 ft)
Span	Wing: 60.3 m (197.83 ft), Main gear: 12.61 m (41.37 ft)		
Wing	361.6 m^{2} (3,892 sq ft), 25% chord wingsweep: 30°, 10.06 Aspect ratio		
Height	17.39 m (57.1 ft)		16.79 m (55.1 ft)
Fuselage	5.64 m (222 in) diameter, 5.26 m (207 in) cabin width		
Seat width	0.46 m (18 in) in 8 abreast economy, 0.53 m (21 in) in 6 abreast business		
Cargo volume	132.4 m^{3} (4,680 ft^{3})	469.2 m^{3} (16,570 ft^{3})	158.4 m^{3} (5,590 ft^{3})
MTOW	242,000 kg (534,000 lb)	233,000 kg (514,000 lb)	242,000 kg (534,000 lb)
OEW	120,600 kg (265,900 lb)	109,400 kg (241,200 lb)	129,400 kg (285,300 lb)
Max Payload	49,400 kg (108,900 lb)	68,600 kg (151,200 lb)	45,600 kg (100,500 lb)
Fuel capacity	139,090 L (36,740 US gal; 30,600 imp gal) – 109,185 kg (240,712 lb)	97,530 L (25,760 US gal; 21,450 imp gal)	139,090 L (36,740 US gal; 30,600 imp gal) – 109,185 kg (240,712 lb)
Engines (×2)	GE CF6 (except -200F) / PW4000 / Trent 700		
Thrust (×2)	64,500–71,100 lbf (287–316 kN)		
Cruise	Mach 0.82 (470 kn; 871 km/h; 541 mph), (Note: Mach 0.86 (493 kn; 914 km/h) M_{MO}) at 12,500 m (41,100 ft) service ceiling		
Range	13,450 km (7,260 nmi; 8,360 mi) (Note: 247 passengers)	7,400 km (4,000 nmi; 4,600 mi)	11,750 km (6,340 nmi; 7,300 mi) (Note: 277 passengers)
Runway (Note: SL, ISA, MTOW/MLW)	Takeoff: 2,770 m (9,090 ft), Landing: 1,730 m (5,680 ft)		

=== Aircraft model designations ===
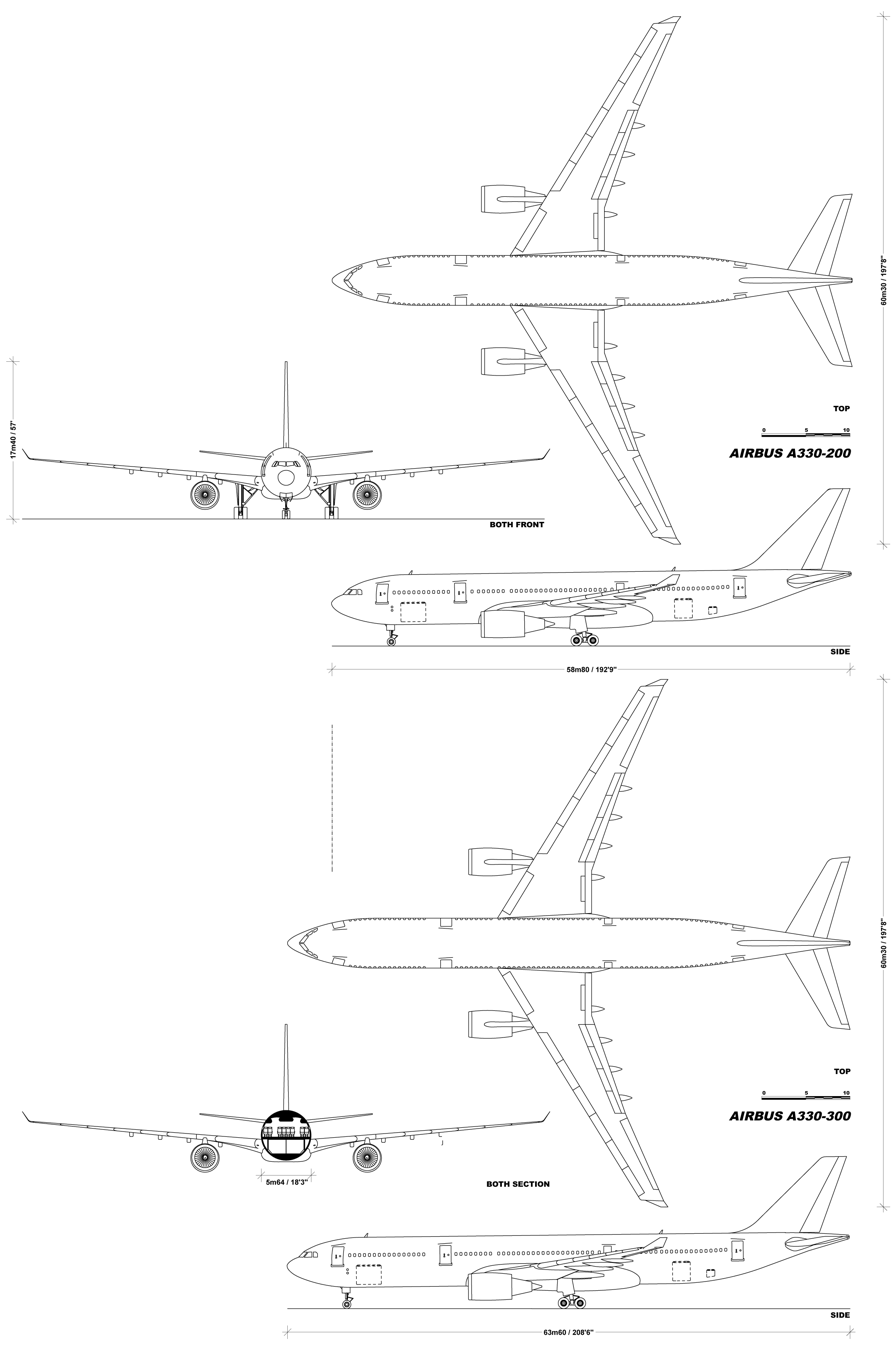
A330 family schematic

EASA Type Certificate Data Sheet
Model	Certification Date	Engines
A330-201	31 October 2002	General Electric CF6-80E1A2
A330-202	31 March 1998	General Electric CF6-80E1A4
A330-203	20 November 2001	General Electric CF6-80E1A3
A330-223	13 July 1998	Pratt & Whitney PW4168A/4170
A330-223F	9 April 2010	Pratt & Whitney PW4170 (Freighter)
A330-243	11 January 1999	Rolls-Royce Trent 772B/C-60
A330-243F	9 April 2010	Rolls-Royce Trent 772B-60 (Freighter)
A330-301	21 October 1993	General Electric CF6-80E1A2
A330-302	17 May 2004	General Electric CF6-80E1A4
A330-303	17 May 2004	General Electric CF6-80E1A3
A330-321	2 June 1994	Pratt & Whitney PW4164
A330-322	2 June 1994	Pratt & Whitney PW4168
A330-323	22 April 1999	Pratt & Whitney PW4168A/4170
A330-341	22 December 1994	Rolls-Royce Trent 768-60
A330-342	22 December 1994	Rolls-Royce Trent 772-60
A330-343	13 September 1999	Rolls-Royce Trent 772B/C-60

=== ICAO Aircraft Type Designators ===
Designation	Type
A332	Airbus A330-200, Airbus A330-200F
A333	Airbus A330-300
A337	Airbus A330-700 Beluga XL

== See also ==
- Competition between Airbus and Boeing

Related development

- Airbus A300
- Airbus A310
- Airbus A330 MRTT
- Airbus CC-330 Husky
- Airbus A330neo
- Airbus A340
- Airbus A350
- Airbus Beluga XL

Aircraft of comparable role, configuration, and era

- Boeing 767
- Boeing 777
- Boeing 787 Dreamliner
- Ilyushin Il-96
- McDonnell Douglas MD-11

Related lists

- List of civil aircraft
- List of jet airliners
