= Brian H. Rowe =

Brian H. Rowe (1931 – February 22, 2007) was a British-born American engineer, chief executive officer of General Electric Aviation, a member of the National Academy of Engineering, a fellow of the Royal Aeronautical Society and a fellow of the American Institute of Aeronautics and Astronautics. Rowe was also noted for his contributions to the development of the world’s most powerful engine, which is used on Boeing 777. The National Academy of Engineering said Rowe was "a man who helped define aviation in the 20th century". General Electric called him "a towering figure in GE Aviation history and a world-renowned jet engine pioneer".
