= UEC-Perm Engines =

Russian aircraft engine manufacturer

JSC UEC-Perm Engines
- Company type: Joint-stock company
- Founded: 1934
- Headquarters: Perm, Russia
- Products: Engines,
- Revenue: $365 million (2017)
- Operating income: $40.2 million (2017)
- Net income: −$24.3 million (2017)
- Total assets: $454 million (2017)
- Total equity: $93.8 million (2017)
- Parent: United Engine Corporation
- Website: www.pmz.ru

JSC UEC-Perm Engines (Russian: Пермский моторный завод) is a company based in Perm, Russia. It is part of United Engine Corporation.

Perm Engine Plant, one of the leading aircraft engine plants in the former USSR, produces a wide range of airplane and helicopter engines, as well as helicopter gearboxes, first-stage engines for the Proton rocket, and machinery for use in the consumer industries. It is collocated with Aviadvigatel (formerly known as the Soloviev Engine Design Bureau).

Former logo from 2007.

== Current products ==
- Aviadvigatel PD-12 turboshaft, an upgrade for the Mi-26, to replace the Ukrainian D-136
- Aviadvigatel PS-12
- AI-20D
- Aviadvigatel PS-30
- Aviadvigatel PD-14 turbofan, will power the Irkut MC-21
- PD-18R geared turbofan
- Aviadvigatel PD-30
- Aviadvigatel PS-90 turbofan, powers Ilyushin Il-76 variants, Ilyushin Il-96 variants, Beriev A-50, and Tupolev Tu-204/214 series.
- GP-2 (PS-90-GP-2) Gas Turbine
- GPA-5,5 (Taurus 60)
- GTE-25P (PS-90GP-25) based on PS-90 and GTA-25 unit GTU-25P Gas Turbine
- GTU-16P on basis PS-90A and GTU-12P
- GTU-12P (based on D-30 engine) and many other GTs
- D-30 variants modifications modernization
- GTU-30P 30 34 MW GTE30, based on D-30F6 and PS-90
- GTA-14 14 MW based on Titan-130 Solar Turbines
- GTU-32P (30 40 MW) on basis D-30F6 and MS5002E (GTU32 "Ladoga" built at NZL plant Saint Petersburg)
- GTE180 GTE160 GT100 GTE65 . unit M94yu2

Building and Development

- PD-24 (around ± 240 kN)
- PD-28 (around ± 280 kN)
- PD-35 (up to 300/328 kN max 350)
- GTUs 30 and 40 MW
- Marine GTUs

=== Shvetsov engines ===
- Shvetsov ASh-2
- Shvetsov ASh-21
- Shvetsov ASh-62/M-62
- Shvetsov ASh-73
- Shvetsov ASh-82/M-82
- Shvetsov ASh-83
- Shvetsov ASh-84
- Shvetsov M-11
- Shvetsov M-22
- Shvetsov M-25
- Shvetsov M-63
- Shvetsov M-64
- Shvetsov M-70
- Shvetsov M-71
- Shvetsov M-72
- Shvetsov M-80
- Shvetsov M-81

=== Soloviev engines ===
- Soloviev D-20 turbofan, powered the Tupolev Tu-124
- Soloviev D-25 turboshaft, powers the Mil Mi-6, Mil Mi-10
- Soloviev D-30 turbofan, powers the Tupolev Tu-134A-3, A-5, and B, Mikoyan-Gurevich MiG-31, Ilyushin Il-62, Ilyushin Il-76 variants, Beriev A-40 and the Tupolev Tu-154

== See also ==
- UEC Saturn
- Aviadvigatel
- ELEMASH Machine-Building Plant
