= Aviadvigatel =

Russian manufacturer of aircraft engines

UEC-Aviadvigatel JSC
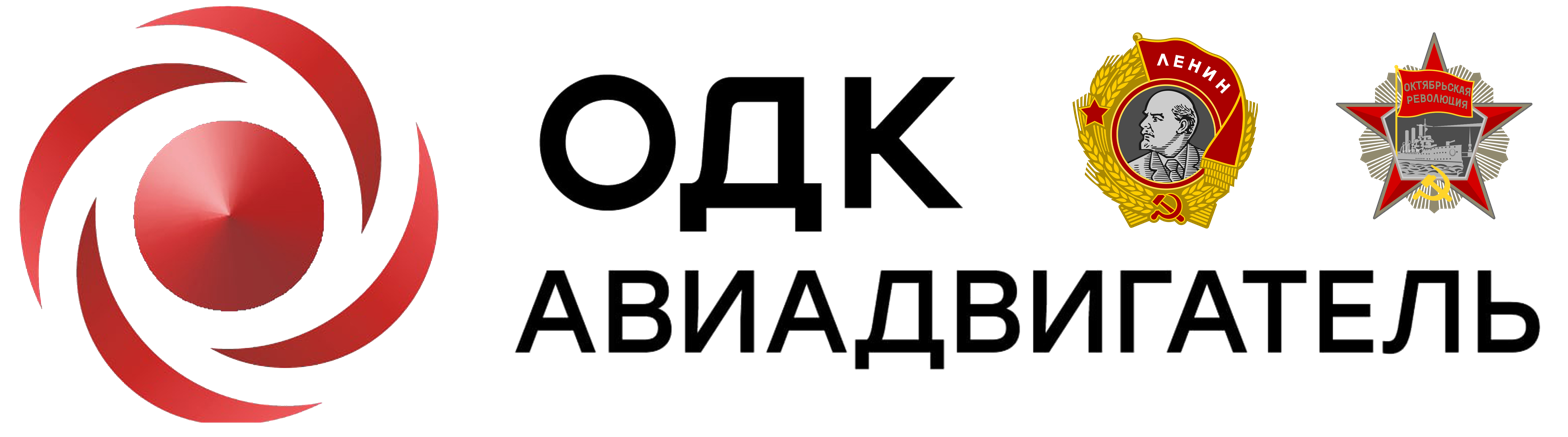
- Native name: АО ОДК-Авиадвигатель
- Formerly: OKB-19, OJSC Aviadvigatel
- Company type: Joint-stock company
- Industry: Aero-engine manufacture
- Founded: 1 June 1934; 91 years ago in Perm Krai, Russia
- Founder: Arkadiy Dmitrievich Shvetsov
- Headquarters: Perm, Russia
- Key people: Alexander A. Inozemtsev (CEO)
- Products: Aeroengines, aeroengine derived gas turbines, gensets
- Revenue: $198 million (2014)
- Owner: United Engine Corporation
- Website: www.avid.ru

UEC-Aviadvigatel JSC (Russian: АО ОДК-Авиадвигатель, lit. 'Aeroengine') is a Russian developer and builder of aircraft engines, most notably jet engines for commercial aircraft. Based at the Perm Engine Plant, its products power the Ilyushin Il-76MF, Ilyushin Il-96, Tupolev Tu-204, and Tupolev Tu-214. It also designs and builds high-efficiency gas turbine units for electric power stations and for gas pumping plants. The company has its background in the Experimental Design Bureau-19 plant, set up to manufacture aircraft engines.

== History ==
=== Foundation and Shvetsov era ===
Family tree of Shvetsov engines

Aviadvigatel can be traced back to the engine design and manufacturing factory (Plant No.19) founded in Perm Krai, Russian Soviet Republic, on 1 June 1934, to produce the Wright Cyclone-derived Shvetsov M-25. Arkadiy Shvetsov was named chief designer at the plant, which was also referred to as the Perm Design/Engine School. The school was given the Soviet Experimental Design Bureau designation of OKB-19, and was informally referred to as the Shvetsov Design Bureau.

The first engine to be built at OKB-19 was a licensed variant of the Wright R-1820-F3 Cyclone 9, designated the Shvetsov M-25 radial engine. Other Shvetsov-designed piston engines produced at OKB-19 were the M-11, M-71 ASh-2, ASh-21, ASh-62, ASh-73, and ASh-82. In just four years OKB-19 became the major designer and provider of radial aircraft engines for the Soviet aircraft industry. Aleksandr Mikulin's and Vladimir Klimov's separate OKB design bureaus were assigned for the creation of inline engines.

During World War II the plant exceeded its original design capacity by a factor of 12, producing more than 32,000 engines for Lavochkin La-5, Sukhoi Su-2 and Tupolev Tu-2s. In the 1950s the factory transitioned from piston engines to jet engines. The plant has consolidated its position and has become a regular partner and supplier of products for Tupolev, Ilyushin, Mikoyan, Mil, and Myasishchev.

=== Soloviev era ===
After the death of Shvetsov in 1953, leadership was taken over by Pavel Alexandrovich Soloviev, and the OKB was referred to afterwards as the Soloviev Design Bureau. Under Soloviev, the company became notable for the D-15 engine that powered the Myasishchev M-50 in 1957. Other notable designs included the D-25 turboshaft and D-20 and D-30 turbofans.

=== Post-Soviet era ===
Since 1989, and up to June, 2001, with a break in 1995-1997, the enterprise was headed by Yuri Evgenievich Reshetnikov.

The Perm Engine Company was established in 1997 as a subsidiary of Perm Motors Company, inheriting the gas turbine production facility and the rich traditions of the largest company of the West Ural. In June 2001 Alexander A. Inozemtsev, the chief designer, became the general director of Aviadvigatel Open Joint Stock Company (OJSC). Starting in October 2006, he was the managing director and chief designer.

In October 2003, "Perm Motors Group Management Company" was established to: 1) coordinate corporate relations and management of the Perm Motors Group companies, 2) resolve strategic marketing matters, and 3) perform investment planning.

"Aviadvigatel" OJSC was merged into the Perm Engine Company, Perm Motors Group.

== Products ==
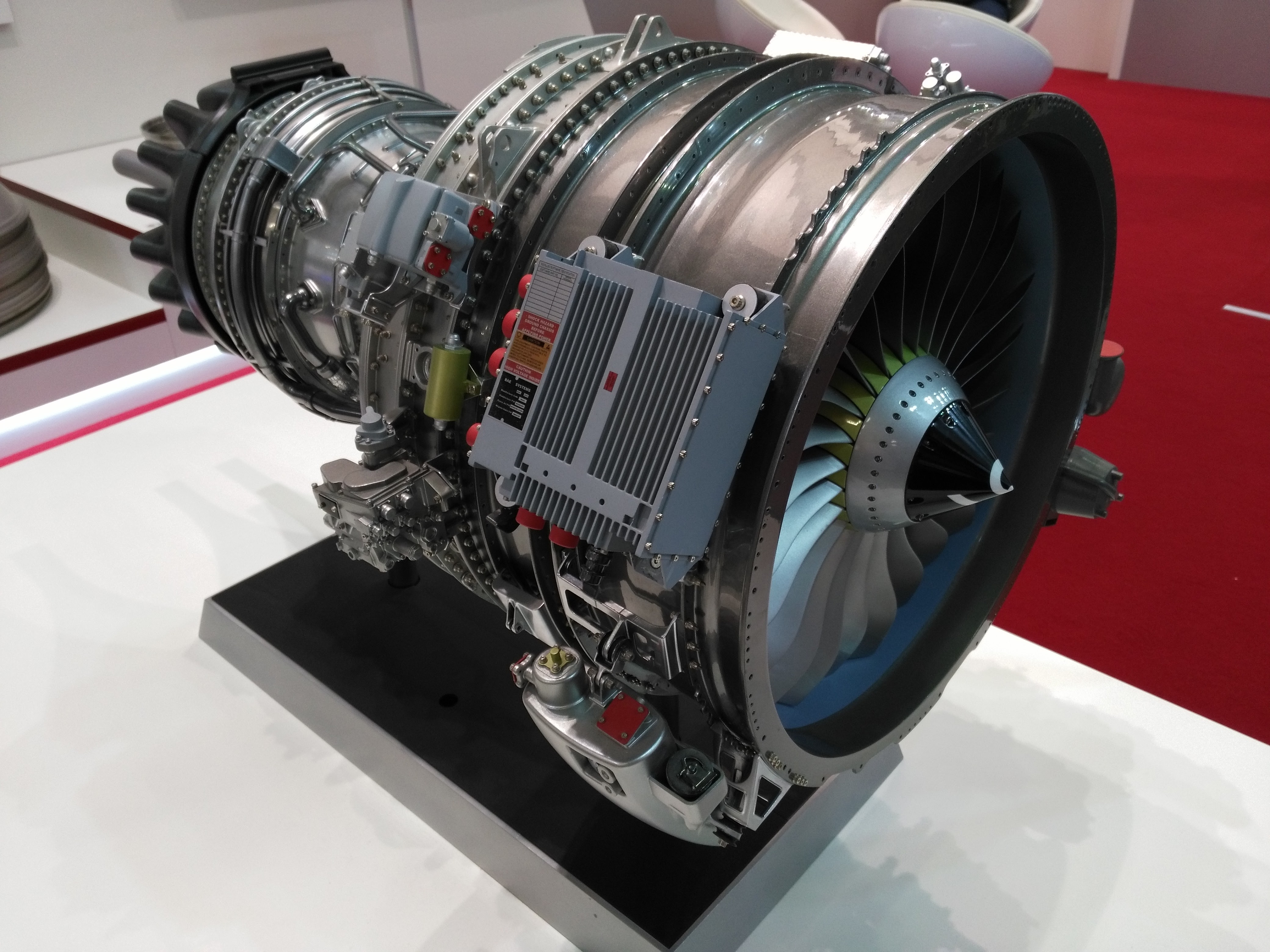
An Aviadvigatel turbofan model

=== Current products ===
- Aviadvigatel PD-12 turboshaft, an upgrade for the Mil Mi-26, to replace the Ukrainian D-136
- Aviadvigatel PS-12
- Aviadvigatel PS-30, D30K variants, D30F6
- Aviadvigatel PD-14 high-bypass turbofan, will power the Yakovlev MC-21
- PD-18R geared turbofan 180 kN
- PD-12V PD14V Turboshaft 8,500 kW (11,400 shp) for Mil Mi-26
- Aviadvigatel PD-8 high-bypass turbofan, will power Sukhoi Superjet 100 (7500 kgf thrust, with a nacelle mass of 2,300 kg)
- Aviadvigatel PD-30
- UMPO R-195, powers the Sukhoi Su-25
- Aviadvigatel PS-90 high-bypass turbofan, which powers Ilyushin Il-76 variants, Ilyushin Il-96 variants, Beriev A-50, and Tupolev Tu-204/214 series
- GP-2 (PS-90-GP-2) Gas Turbine
- GPA-5,5 (Taurus 60)
- GTE-25P (PS-90GP-25) based on PS-90 and GTA-25 unit GTU-25P Gas Turbine
- GTU-16P on basis PS-90A and GTU-12P
- GTU-12P based on D-30, other GTs (like GTU4P GTU6P)
- GTU-8 (6-8,5 MW) and GTU-16 (12,4-16,5 MW) from PD-14
- GTU-30P 30 34 MW GTE30 based on D-30F6 and PS-90
- GTA-14 14 MW based on Titan-130 Solar Turbines
- GTU-32P (up to 34 40 MW) on basis D-30F6 and MS5002E (GPU32 "Ladoga" built in NZL plant in Saint Petersburg)
- GTE180 GTE160 GT100 GTE65; unit M94yu2

Building and Development

- PD-24 (around ± 240 kN)
- PD-26 (around ± 255 kN)
- PD-28 (around ± 280 kN)
- PD-35 (up to 300/328 kN max 350) for An-124 transport and airliners (along PD24 PD28 scaled up PD14 PD18 cores)
- GTUs 30 and 40 MW

=== Shvetsov engines ===
- Shvetsov ASh-2 - four-row, 28 cylinder radial developed from the ASh-82, 1949; Shvetsov's last piston engine
- Shvetsov ASh-21 - single-row, 7 cylinder version of ASh-82, 1947
- Shvetsov ASh-62 - known as M-62 before 1941; improved M-25 with a two-speed supercharger and improved induction system, 1937
- Shvetsov ASh-73 - two-row, 18-cylinder radial developed from the M-72, 1947
- Shvetsov ASh-82 - also known as M-82; two-row, 14 cylinder radial developed from the M-62, 1940
- Shvetsov ASh-83 - boosted version of ASh-82FN, 1944
- Shvetsov ASh-84
- Shvetsov M-11 - five-cylinder radial, 1923
- Shvetsov M-22 - Bristol Jupiter built under license, 1918
- Shvetsov M-25 - Wright R-1820-F3 Cyclone built under license, 1934
- Shvetsov M-63 - improved M-62 with more power due to higher compression and higher redline, 1939
- Shvetsov M-64
- Shvetsov M-70 - two-row, 18-cylinder version of the M-25, 1938; cancelled due to failures of the master connecting rod and the supercharger impeller
- Shvetsov M-71 - improved M-70, 1939; cancelled as there was no production capacity available
- Shvetsov M-72 - boosted version of M-71, 1945; superseded by the ASh-73
- Shvetsov M-80
- Shvestov M-81
- Shvetsov M-93

=== Soloviev engines ===
- Soloviev D-20 low-bypass turbofan, which powered the Tupolev Tu-124
- Soloviev D-25 turboshaft, which powers the Mil Mi-6, Mil Mi-10
- Soloviev D-30 two-shaft, low-bypass turbofan, which powers the Tupolev Tu-134A-3, A-5, and B, Mikoyan MiG-31, Ilyushin Il-62, Ilyushin Il-76 variants, Beriev A-40, and the Tupolev Tu-154

== See also ==
- UEC-Perm Engines
- Phazotron-NIIR
