= Aviadvigatel PD-14 =

2010s Russian turbofan aircraft engine

PD-14
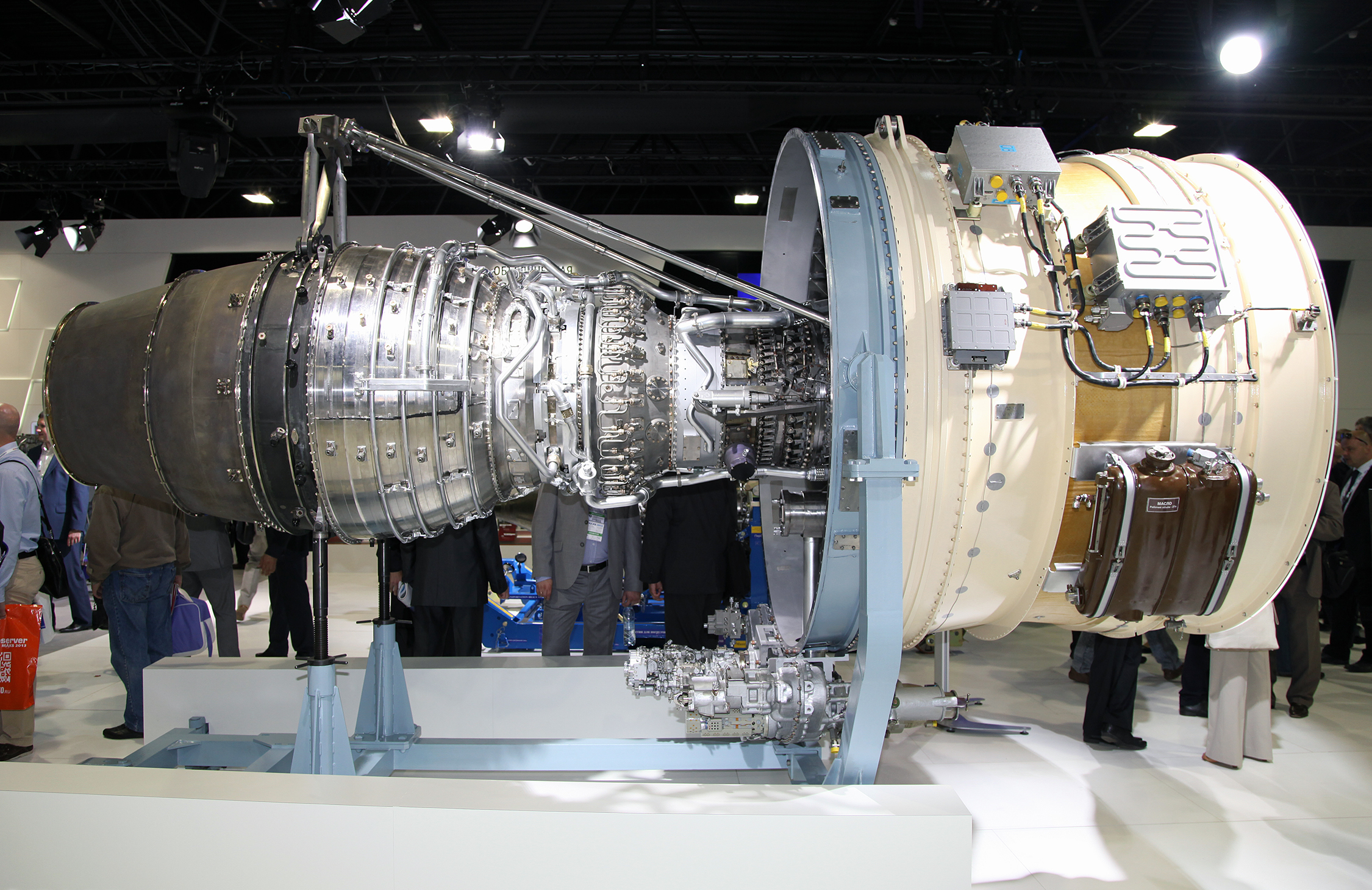
- Side view
- Type: Turbofan
- National origin: Russia
- Manufacturer: Aviadvigatel / UEC-Perm Engines
- First run: Summer 2014
- Major applications: Yakovlev MC-21
- Status: In production
- Number built: More than 13 (2018)
- Developed from: Aviadvigatel PS-90

The Aviadvigatel PD-14 (Russian: Авиадвигатель ПД-14) is a wide family of high-bypass turbofan engines that was developed by Aviadvigatel between 2010 and 2025 to power the Yakovlev MC-21 twin-jet airliner. Previously known as the PS-12, it is a 14 tf (30,865 lbf) thrust powerplant that allegedly features many new technologies. The goal of the program was to develop a modern fuel efficient power plant capable of competing with 21st century Western engines.

During development, a substantial focus was placed on fuel economy, emissions and international serviceability, areas of traditional weakness for Russian engines such as the Aviadvigatel PS-90. The engine received its initial certification in 2018, with a major change to permit operation at below minus 10 degrees Celsius being certified in December 2024. Current performance and economy claims put the engine on par with the CFM International LEAP and about 5% behind the Pratt & Whitney PW1000G in fuel economy. Serial production of the PD-14 intended for the Yakovlev MC-21-310 started in 2025.

== Development ==
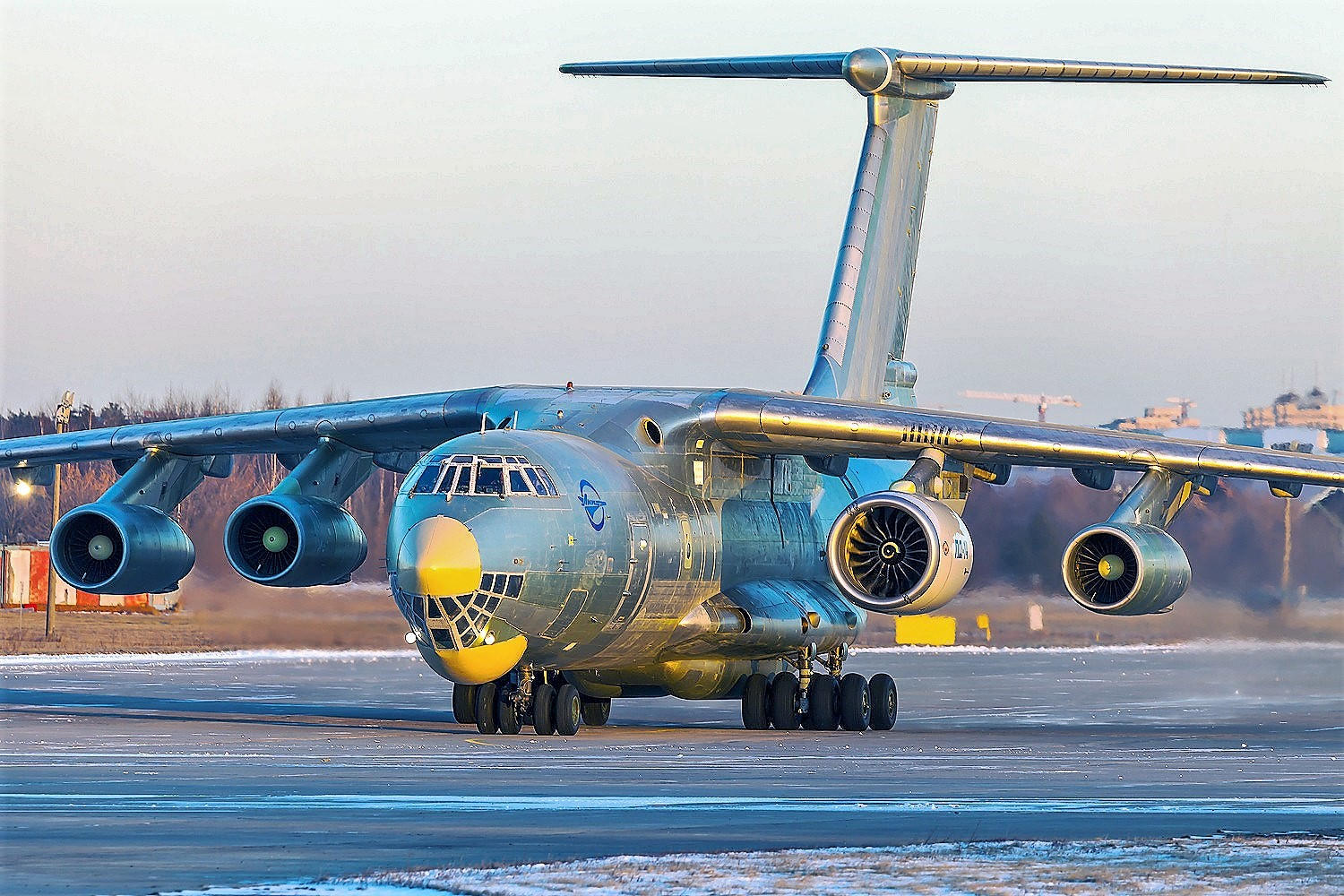
Flight testing on an Il-76

External media

Images
- PD-14 engine with chevrons on the plane Il-76LL. Oktober 2015.
- PD-14 engine in the assembly. Augustus 2015.

Video
- PD-14: Flight tests of the engine. November 2015. (in Russian)

In December 2009, the PD-14 was developed to be 15% more efficient than its PS-90A2 predecessor and to be installed on the MC-21 and the Ilyushin Il-276.

The PD-14 was announced in early 2010 with its development cost estimated at RUB 35 billion (US$1.1 billion). In April 2010, Aviadvigatel was expecting to start its certification procedure in 2012. Its core was first tested on 26 November 2010. It was displayed for the first time at the 2013 Russian MAKS air show.

Flight tests began in 2015 on an Ilyushin Il-76. Between December 2016 and May 2017, the PD-14 operational performance and working efficiency at all altitudes and speeds were assessed on the Il-76 testbed aircraft at Gromov Flight Research Institute near Moscow. After two years of exploring the performance at most altitudes, airspeeds and operating modes, the first and second testing stages confirmed its basic operating parameters. A third phase of flight tests started in January 2018 from the GFRI Zhukovsky Airfield, conducted in co-operation with certification specialists in order to formally confirm the pre-certification findings.

Ground tests were to continue in parallel, and United Engine Corporation claimed that the engine matched the performance of products from foreign competitors and even surpassed them for noise and emissions. Bird strike tests on the fan, including high-speed video and vibration measurements, were conducted together with fan blade strength tests. The results were expected to reduce the time and cost for attaining full certification status.

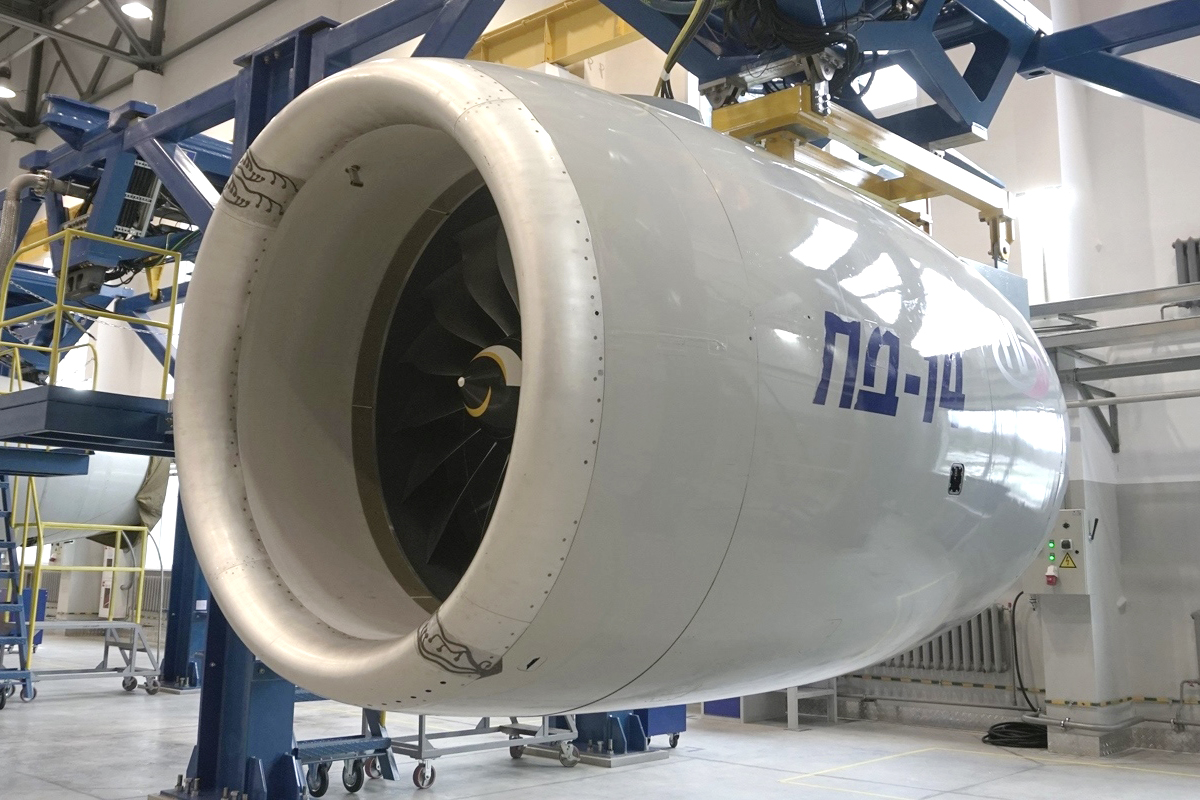
A PD-14 assembly as seen in 2018.

United Engine was to deliver five PD-14 engines to Irkut by the end of 2018, following Rosaviatsia certification. The aim was to start flight tests on the MC-21 in 2019 for type certification of the variant by 2021. EASA certification was expected, when the engine entered serial production. In October 2018, Rosaviatsia granted certification for the PD-14, and delivery of the first engines for two MC-21s were then expected by the end of 2018. European certificate validation was planned for 2019.

In January 2020, Irkut received the first PD-14 engines to be installed on an MC-21 airliner, and the first PD-14-powered MC-21-310 variant made its maiden flight on 15 December 2020 from Irkutsk.

In October 2021, the engine successfully passed landmark volcanic ash exposure tests. According to Anatoly Serdyukov, the thrust of the PD-14 “practically did not decrease” after the engine was exposed to the presence of the ash for one hour.

Until November 2024, United Engine Corporation (UEC) delivered only two PD-14 engines to customers, even though in October 2023 Alexander Inozemtsev, general designer of UEC-Aviation Engines, reported to Vladimir Putin about the intention to produce 12 PD-14 engines in 2024 and 24 in 2025. The plans for 2025 were reduced to seven units.

The first mass-produced batch was delivered to a test facility in February 2025. The new engine features hollow titanium fan blades for reduced weight and allegedly incorporates at least 16 new technological solutions. The engine was approved for low-temperature operation.

According to Aerospace Global News, Russian daily newspaper Kommersant said in January 2025 that 24 PD-14 engines were planned to be produced in 2025 but that this was then reduced to seven units for the whole of 2025. Kommersant said that production of the MC-21 would reach a rate of 36 units per year after 2029.

== Design ==
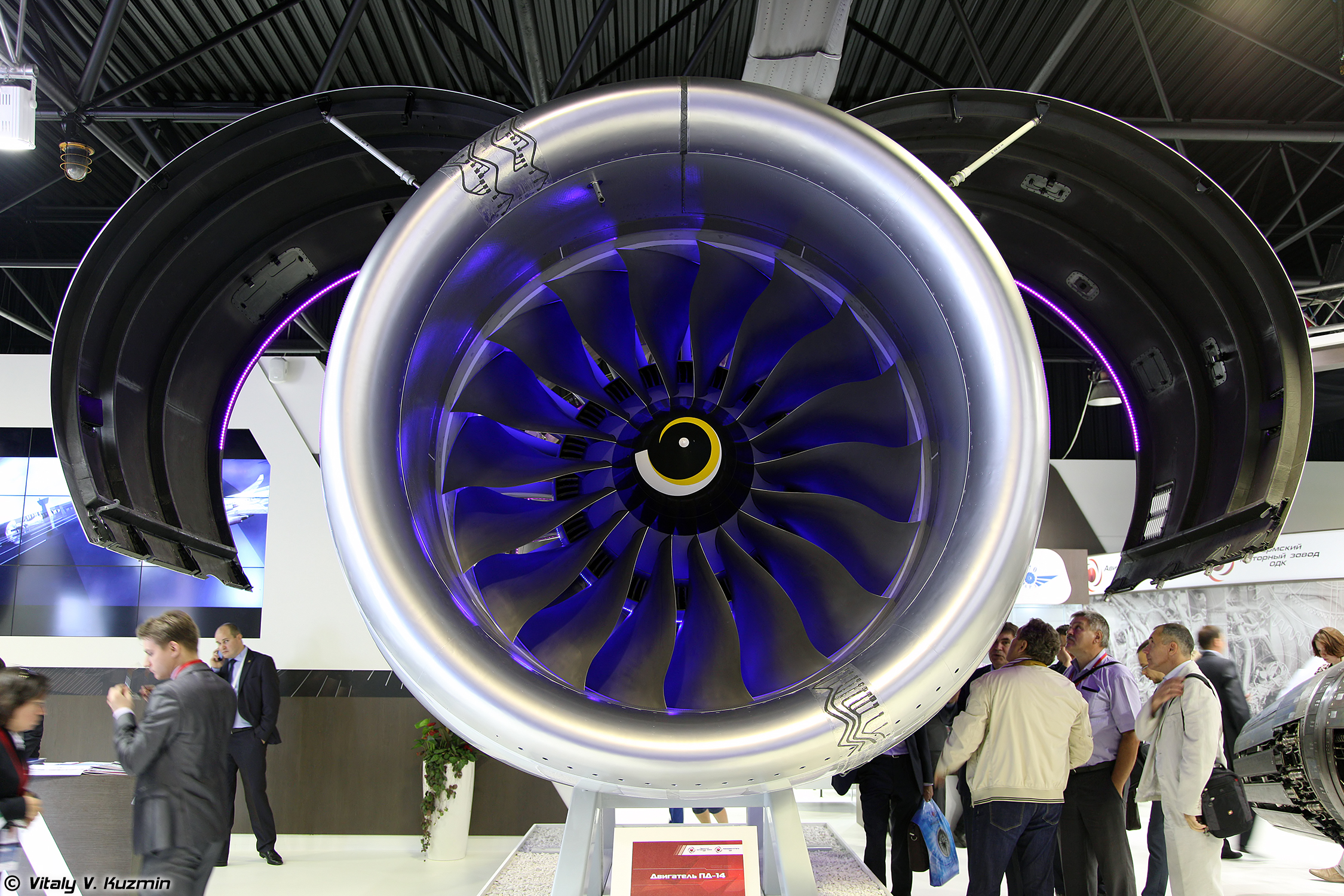
Front view

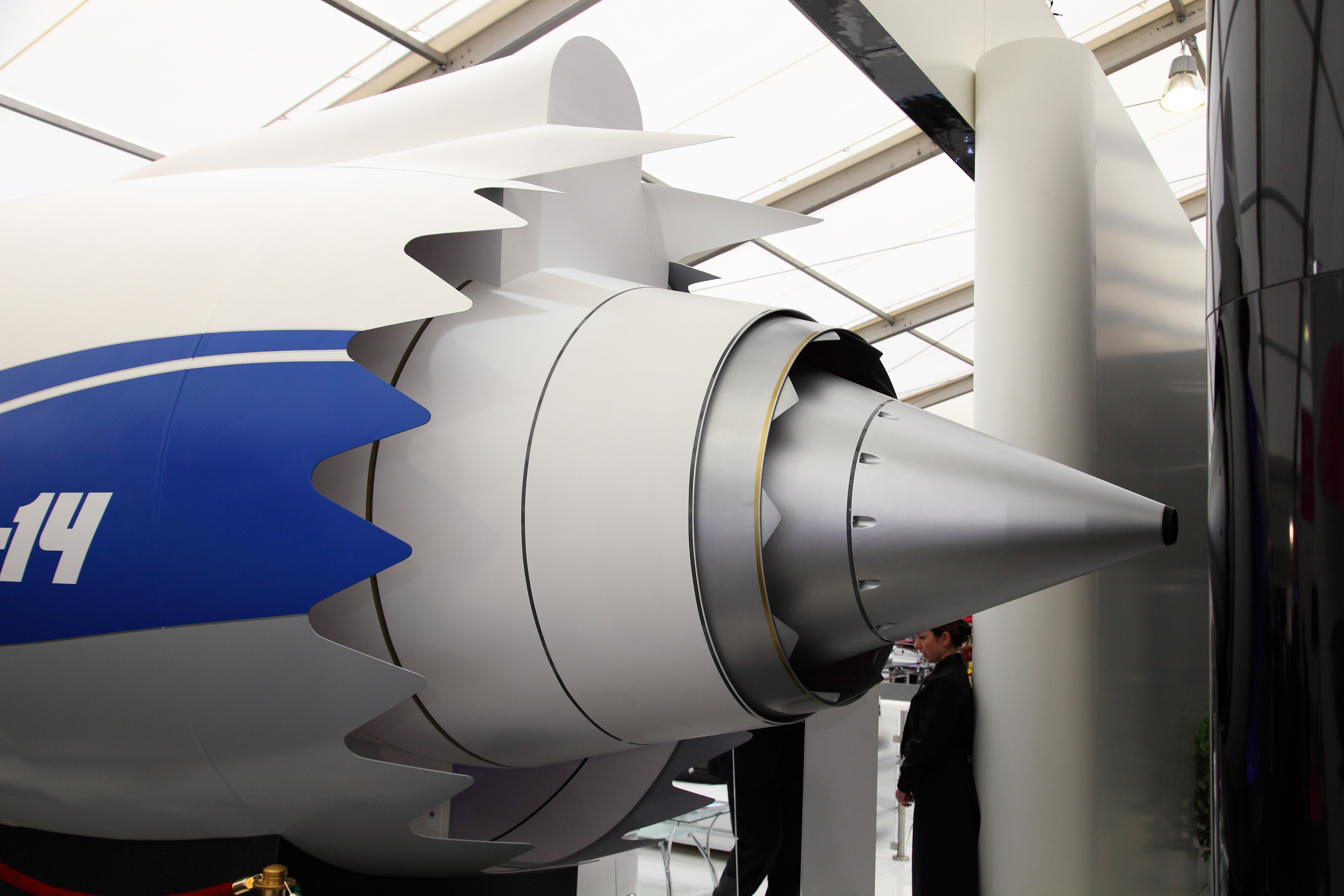
Separated rear exhaust, ILA Berlin Air Show 2012

Developed using experience from the PS-12 (an uprated PS-90A), the 122–153 kN (27,500–34,500 lbf) thrust powerplant is designed by Aviadvigatel and manufactured by the Perm Engine Company. The two-shaft turbofan has a high-pressure core from the PS-12 with an eight-stage compressor and a two-stage turbine, and four low-pressure stages. The high-bypass engine does not employ an exhaust mixer, fuel burn should be reduced by 10–15% from the CFM International CFM56 and it could power an upgraded Tupolev Tu-204.

The PD-14 features a composite nacelle to reduce weight. The 1.9 m (75 in) fan has 18 wide-chord hollow titanium alloy blades, providing an 8.5:1 bypass ratio significantly improved from previous Russian engines, but below the CFM LEAP's 10:1 or the Pratt & Whitney PW1000G's 12:1 for the MC-21 from 2017. The 3D aerodynamics shaped first high-pressure turbine stage has advanced cooling channels and active clearance control. Twenty new materials were developed for the powerplant, including monocrystalline alloys for vanes, and high-strength nickel and Titanium aluminide alloys for shafts and blisks.

The annular combustor features world first Pneumatic (air-assist or air-blast) fuel injectors using compressed air to improve fuel atomization and mixing, as well as ceramic coatings. This allows for reduced emissions and maintenance with a slight improvement in fuel economy.

== Production ==
According to Frontier India, the first two serial MC-21-310 aircraft with Aviadvigatel PD-14 engines had been completed by the end of September 2026, with a third and fourth plane being processed with their PD-14 engines on the assembly line. According to this report, a further set of serial PD-14 engines had been shipped to the Irkutsk Aviation Plant by September 2026.

== Derivatives ==
=== PD-8 ===
The PD-8 is a smaller derivative of the PD-14, developed for the 78 kN (17,500 lbf) thrust class. It is intended to replace the Franco-Russian PowerJet SaM146 on the Yakovlev SJ-100 and the Russo-Ukrainian Progress D-436 on the Beriev Be-200 and Ilyushin Il-212.

Development began in 2019, drawing on technical solutions from the PD-14 but with a smaller core and a revised architecture. Flight testing on an Ilyushin Il-76LL testbed aircraft started in December 2022, and the PD-8 made its first flight on an SJ-100 prototype on 17 March 2025. After delays related to maximum-thrust performance, type certification was granted by Rosaviatsia on 5 June 2026, and series production began later that year.

=== PD-35 ===
Launched in the summer of 2016 by United Engine Corporation through Aviadvigatel and NPO Saturn, the 35 tf (77,000 lbf) thrust PD-35 was to be developed until 2025 for 180 billion rubles ($3 billion), including 60 billion for test benches and laboratory equipment, to power future wide-body aircraft including the Russo-Chinese project CRAIC CR929 (since continued solely by the Chinese partner). The 8 m (26 ft) long engine will weigh 8 t (18,000 lb), its fan was planned to be 3.1 m (10 ft) in diameter and its scaled up PD-14 core to have a nine-stage high-pressure compressor and two-stage turbine.

On 19 January 2018, the Russian government awarded UEC-Aviadvigatel a ₽64.3 billion ($1.13 billion) contract to develop a PD-35-1 demonstrator by 2023, including wide-chord composite fan blades and fan case, a 23:1 compressor pressure ratio, ceramic matrix composites, made of silicon carbide-silicon carbide (SiC-SiC) and carbon-silicon carbide (C-SiC), and advanced cooling for 1,450 °C (2,640 °F) temperatures. The engine might power the Ilyushin IL-96-400, the Il-76 airlifter, the Il-78 tanker and an Antonov An-124 replacement Ilyushin Il-106 PAK VTA. A de-rated version would also meet the An-124 thrust requirements.

At the end of 2022, the PD-35 was postponed until at least 2029.

=== Other proposed derivatives ===
- PD-8V turboshaft 6.8 7.68 – 9680 shp for Mi-24/35 8/17 and other medium heavy heli.
- PD-10 is a derated model for the SSJ-130 at 10.9 tf (24,000 lbf).
- PD-12V: turboshaft variant for the Mil Mi-26 heavy lift helicopter, development started in 2016, 11,500 shp (up to 14,500 shp).
- PD-14А, derated modification of the engine to 12.5 tf (27,600 lbf) for Yakovlev МС-21-200, also it could replace 12 tf Soloviev D-30 powering the Beriev A-40 aircraft.
- PD-14M, uprated to 15.6 tf (34,400 lbf), and PD-16, uprated to 17.5 tf (38,600 lbf), with more LP compressor and turbine stages, for the Yakovlev МС-21-400 stretch to 230-seat and its long-range derivative with a 0.526 lb/lbf/h (14.9 g/kN/s) cruise Thrust-specific fuel consumption; and could replace the 16-tf PS-90A powering the Tupolev Tu-204/214 narrowbody, the Ilyushin Il-96-300 widebody, and the Il-76M-90A freighter.
- PD-18R geared turbofan, 18.7 tf (41,000 lbf), it could reach a cruise Thrust-specific fuel consumption of 0.506 lb/lbf/h (14.3 g/kN/s) and could replace the 17.4 tf (38,000 lbf) PS-90A1 on the Il-96-400T freighter.
- Gas power station: from 6,5 till 12,5 Megawatt

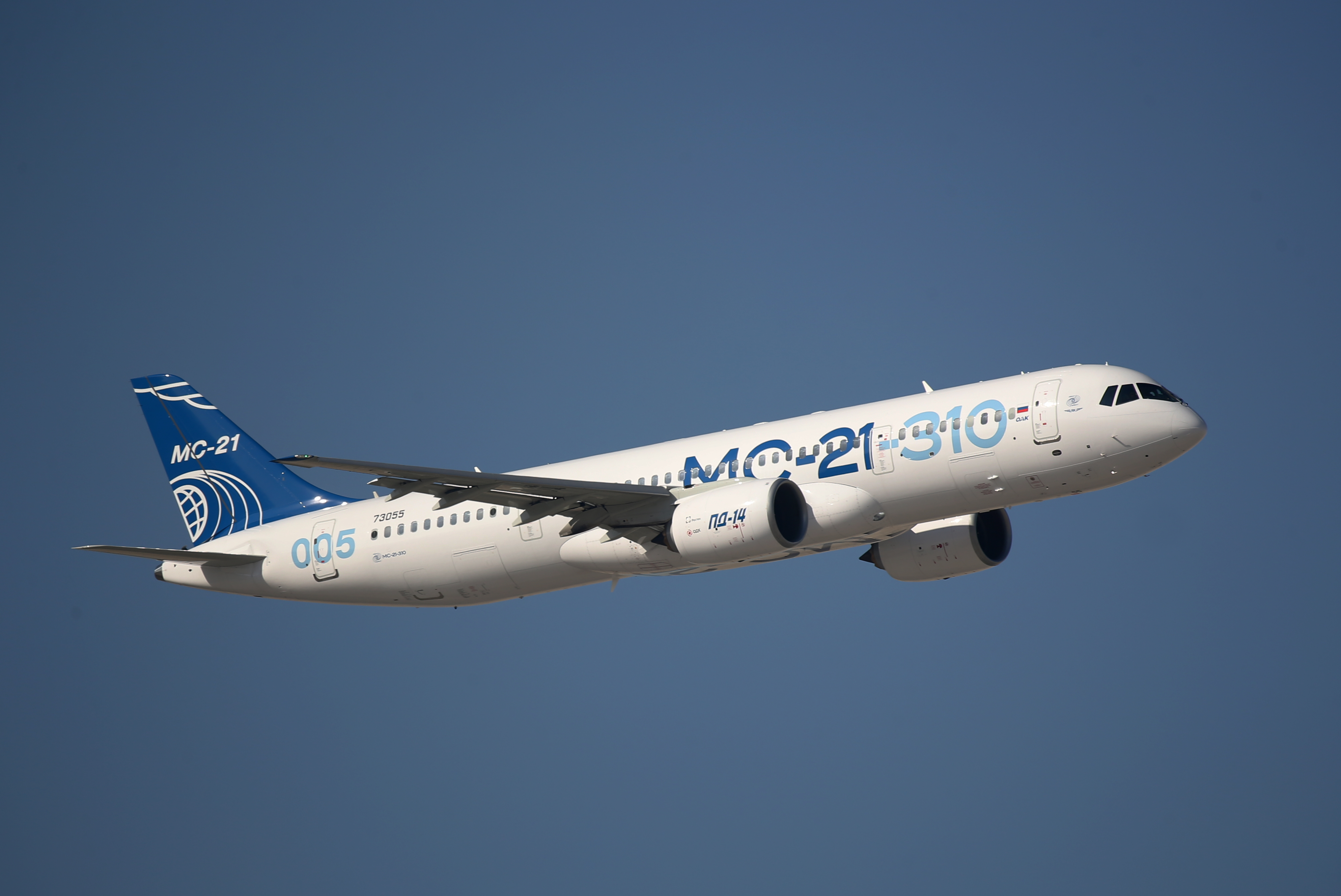
A MC-21-310 powered by PD-14.

== Applications ==
- PD-8: SJ-100, Beriev Be-200, Ilyushin Il-212
- PD-10: SJ-130
- PD-12V: Mil Mi-26
- PD-14: Yakovlev MC-21, Ilyushin Il-276
- PD-35 : Comac C929, Ilyushin Il-96, Ilyushin Il-106 PAK VTA

== Specifications ==
The PD-14 Engine and Advanced Engines Family
Model	PD-8	PD-10	PD-14A	PD-14	PD-14M	PD-26	PD-35
Configuration	Twin-spool high bypass turbofan						
Take-off thrust	78 kN; 18,000 lbf	107 kN; 24,000 lbf	123 kN; 28,000 lbf	137 kN; 31,000 lbf	153 kN; 34,000 lbf	255 kN; 57,000 lbf	343 kN; 77,000 lbf
Dry weight	2,300 kg (5,100 lb)	2,350 kg (5,180 lb)	2,870 kg (6,330 lb)		2,970 kg (6,550 lb)		9,840 kg (21,690 lb)
Fan diameter	1,228 mm (48.3 in)	1,677 mm (66.0 in)	1,900 mm (75 in)				3,100 mm (120 in)
Compressor		1 fan + 1 LP + 8 HP	1 fan + 3-stage LP + 8-stage HP		1 fan + 4 LP + 8 HP		
Combustor	Annular						
Turbine		2 HP + 5 LP	2-stage HP + 6-stage LP				
BPR	4.4		8.6	8.5	7.2		11.1
OPR			38	41	46		
TSFC		14.9 g/kN/s; 0.526 lb/lbf/h in cruise					
Thrust-to-weight ratio		4.64	4.36	4.88	5.25		
Application	Yakolev SJ-100	Superjet 130	МС-21-200	MC-21-310	MC-21-400	Ilyushin PAK VTA	Comac C929

== See also ==
Related development

- Aviadvigatel PS-90

Comparable engines

- ACAE CJ-1000A
- CFM International LEAP
- Pratt & Whitney PW1000G

Related lists

- List of aircraft engines
