= United Engine Corporation =

Russian state-owned company

- Type: State-owned
- Founded: 2008; 18 years ago
- Headquarters: Moscow, Russia
- Parent: Rostec
- Website: uecrus.com

JSC United Engine Corporation (Russian: Объединённая двигателестроительная корпорация) is a Russian state-owned company responsible for production of engines for military and civil aviation and space exploration programs. It manufactures power turbines for electricity and heat generation, gas compressor units and marine gas-turbine units. In 2018, the company's revenue amounted to 42 billion rubles.

UEC has created a new version of the PD-14 aviation engine for the next-generation MS-21 aircraft as well as a next-generation military engine for the 5th generation fighter jet, helicopter engines etc. The company has also engineered and introduced to the market new gas-turbine units with a capacity of 60-110 mw.

Compared to other companies of the Rostec group, the financial situation of United Engine Corporation is described as "quite unstable", owing to the considerable amount of debt raised to fund asset purchases.

The company was sanctioned by the United States Office of Foreign Assets Control in December 2015.

== Structure ==
Companies included in the group:

- Klimov, Saint-Petersburg (main plant, with close smaller old plant, and new plant and test center at near to north of Lahta locale, a test center in Pskov Tver area .
- Chernyshev Moscow Engineering Plant MMP, Moscow

Tushino MKB Soyuz

- JSC Kuznetsov OAO Motorostroitel, Samara Oblast
  - Kuznetsov Design Bureau, Universalnoe plant, KMPO (Kazan, close to KAPO)
- Aerosila provide propellers fan and other, APU
- NPO Saturn, Yaroslavl Oblast
  - Turborus NPO Saturn, Rybinsk
  - UEC - Gas Turbines, (north shore northern) Rybinsk Yaroslavl Oblast
  - OMKB and OMO named after Baranov Omsk
- Tyumen Motor Plant
- Salyut Machine-Building Association, Moscow (three plants plus outside test plant)
- Naro Fominsk Motor Plant
- AMNTK Sojuz
- Lytkarino Motor Plants (CAGI, CIAM, NPO Saturn, NPO Soyuz MKB Turaevo, UMPO, ODK GT)
- Aviadvigatel, Perm Region
  - Perm Motor Plant, Perm Region
- JSC Star, Perm Region
- UMPO
  - NPP Motor, Ufa

== Operation ==
The UEC was formed by Decree of the President of the Russian Federation No.497 dated April 16, 2008 and Decree of the Government of the Russian Federation No.1446-r dated October 04, 2008 in order to consolidate the intellectual and production potential of the domestic engine industry to ensure the competitiveness of Russian engine products on the world market. Currently more than 80% of the aircraft engine industry assets are integrated into the UEC. JSC United Engine Corporation carries out the development, production and after-sales service of a wide range of gas turbine engines. The Corporation's activities are currently carried out in the following areas:

- Engines for military aviation;
- Engines for combat aircraft;
- Engines for military transport and strategic aviation;
- Ground-based engines;
- Gas turbine installations;
- Package of gas turbine installations;
- Helicopter engines;
- Engines for civil aviation;
- Rocket engines;
- Short-life gas turbine engines;
- Marine gas turbine engines.

== Priority projects ==
- The SaM146 engine, which is equipped with the SSJ100 regional liner. This is the first power plant manufactured in Russia to receive an international EASA type certificate.
- the PD-14 heater. This is one of the priority and innovative products of the corporation. The engine is designed using the most modern technologies and, at the same time, based on reliable and well-proven solutions. When creating the engine, a two-shaft doble-circuit scheme with direct fan drive, a highly efficient gas generator with an 8-stage KVD and a 2-stage TVD were used. New generation 3-D aerodynamics and advanced technologies are used in all engine components (technologies for manufacturing wide-chord hollow titanium fan blades by diffusion welding and superplastic molding, cooling and protection of the hot part, manufacture of engine parts and assemblies and nacelles from polymer composite materials), as well as new materials (intermetallic and heat-resistant nickel alloys for the manufacture of turbine blades, high-strength alloys for the manufacture of compressor and turbine discs, a new generation of polymer composite materials). The PD-14 engine has been developed and will be produced in Russia.
- The GTD-110M nitrogen turbine power plant with a capacity of more than 110 MW is a single-shaft gas turbine designed for use in high-power gas turbine power and combined-cycle gas installations. It is the result of a deep modernization of the GTD-110 gas turbine engine. Domestic gas turbines in the power class over 110 MW are not mass-produced in Russia.

== Products ==
=== Aerospace ===
==== Turbofans ====
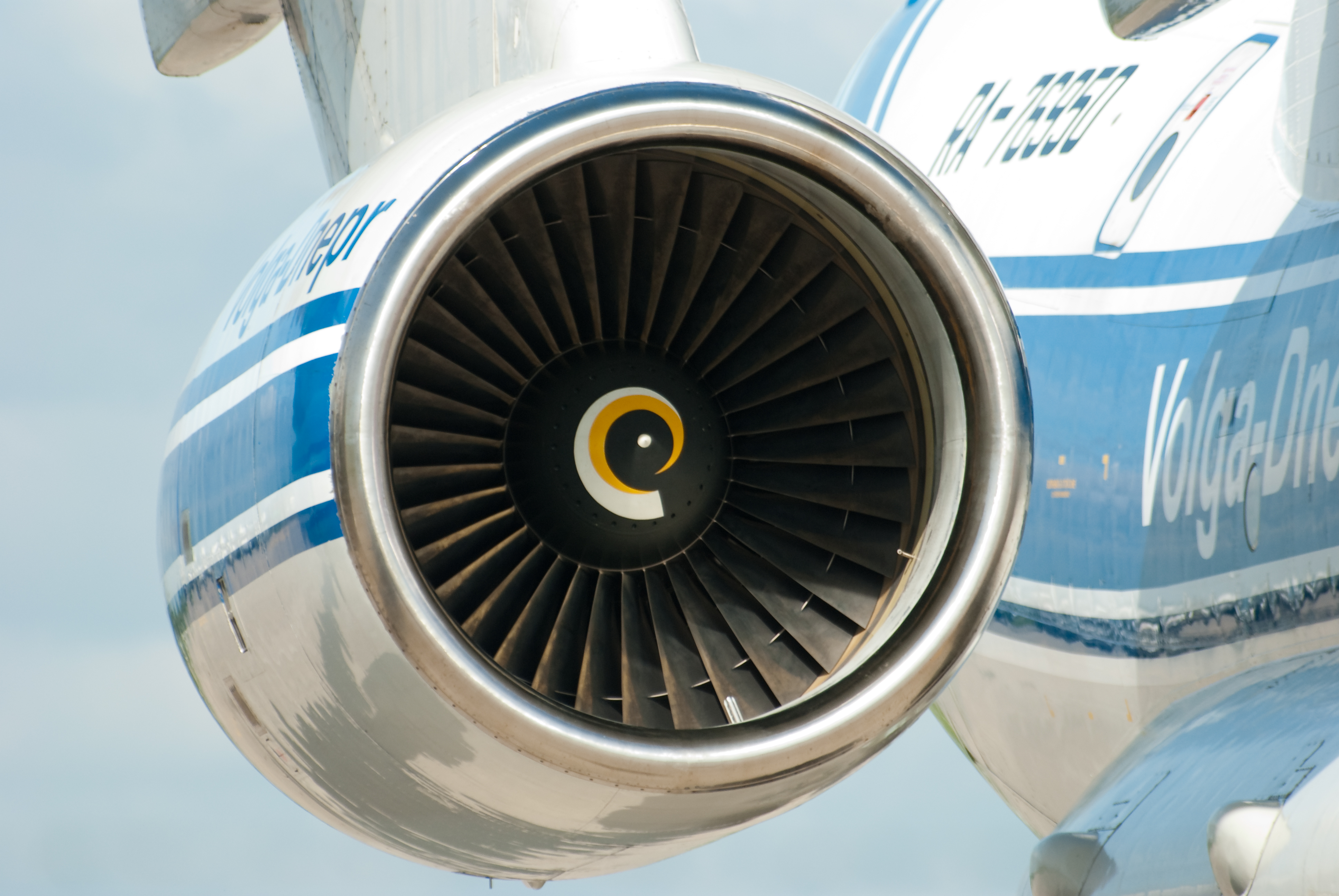
Aviadvigatel PS-90

- Aviadvigatel PS-90 (1983-present)
- Aviadvigatel PD-14 (2014-present)
  - PD-8
- PowerJet SaM146 (2008-2022)
