= PS90 =

PS90 or PS-90 may refer to:

- FN PS90, a semi-automatic civilian/carbine variant of the Belgian FN P90 personal defense weapon.
- Aviadvigatel PS-90, Russian high-bypass commercial turbofan aircraft engine.
