= Arkady Shvetsov =

Soviet aircraft engine designer (1892–1953)

Arkady Dmitrievich Shvetsov
- Born: January 1892; Nizhniye Sergi, Sverdlovsk Oblast
- Died: 19 March 1953 (aged 61); Moscow
- Occupation: Aircraft engine designer
- Known for: Producer of Shvetsov M-25 engine
- Awards: Hero of Socialist Labour

Arkady Dmitrievich Shvetsov (Russian: Аркадий Дмитриевич Швецов) (January 1892, Nizhniye Sergi, today's Sverdlovsk Oblast - 19 March 1953, Moscow) was a Soviet aircraft engine designer whose OKB was founded in Perm, USSR, in 1934, to produce the Wright Cyclone-derived Shvetsov M-25 engine. Under Shvetsov, his OKB became the primary provider of radial piston engines for Soviet aircraft industry (Mikulin's and Klimov's OKB were assigned to creation of in-line engines). After his death in 1953, the OKB was taken over by Pavel Soloviev. Four Stalin Prizes (1942, 1943, 1946, 1948). Hero of Socialist Labour (1942).

== See also ==
- Aviadvigatel
