= Aviadvigatel PS-90 =

1990s Russian turbofan aircraft engine

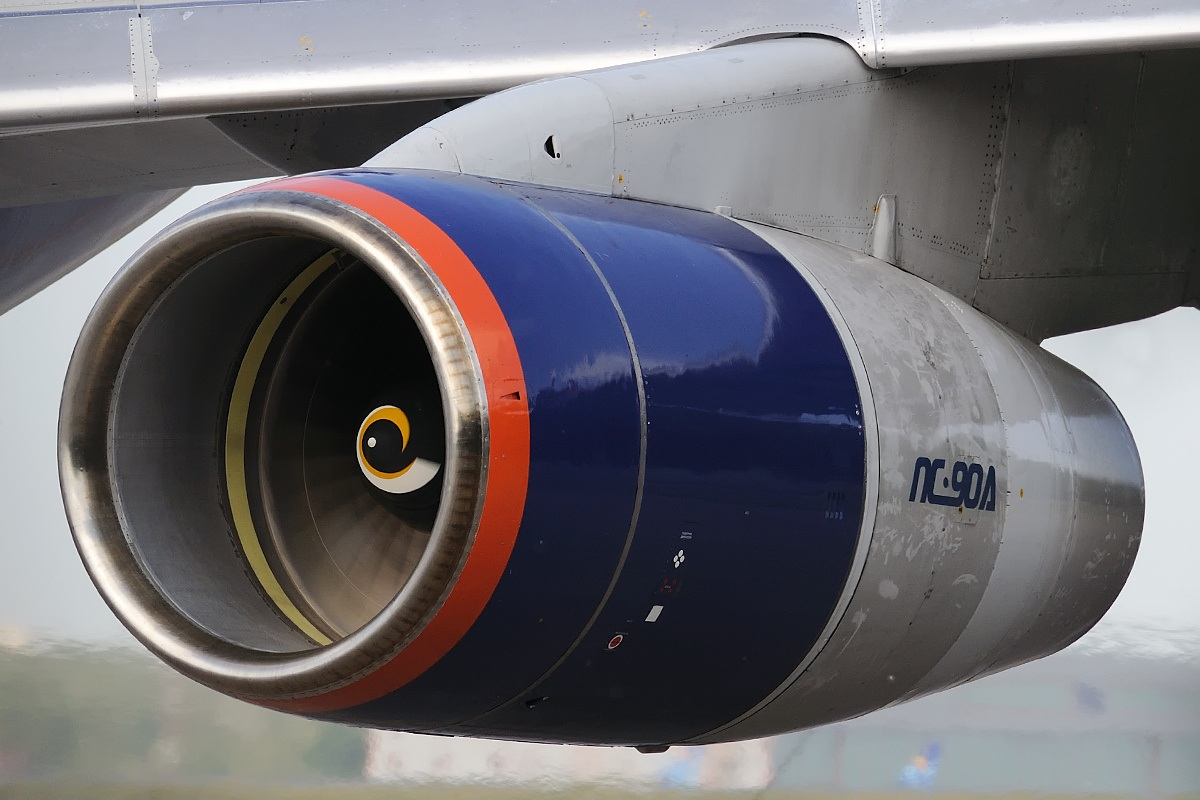
- PS-90A
- Type: Turbofan
- National origin: Russia
- Manufacturer: Aviadvigatel / UEC-Perm Engines
- First run: 1983
- Major applications: Ilyushin Il-96; Tupolev Tu-204; Ilyushin Il-76
- Number built: 1000 as of 2018
- Developed into: PD-14

The Aviadvigatel PS-90 is a Russian high-bypass commercial turbofan rated at 16000 kgf (157 kN, 35,300 lbf) thrust. It powers Russian airliners such as the Ilyushin Il-96 and the Tupolev Tu-204/Tu-214 series and transport aircraft such as the Ilyushin Il-76. It is made by the Russian aircraft engine company Aviadvigatel, which is the successor of the Soviet Soloviev Design Bureau. "PS" are the initials of Pavel Soloviev (Russian: Пáвел Алексáндрович Соловьёв).

== Design and development ==
With the advent of new generation of Soviet airliners, Aviadvigatel developed the PS-90 to satisfy the demands of economy, performance and exhaust emissions. It represented a huge advance over previous generations of 1960s era Soviet engines. The PS-90 is almost double the efficiency of those engines and is reasonably competitive to western engines of the 1980s such as the Pratt & Whitney PW2000.

=== Design features ===
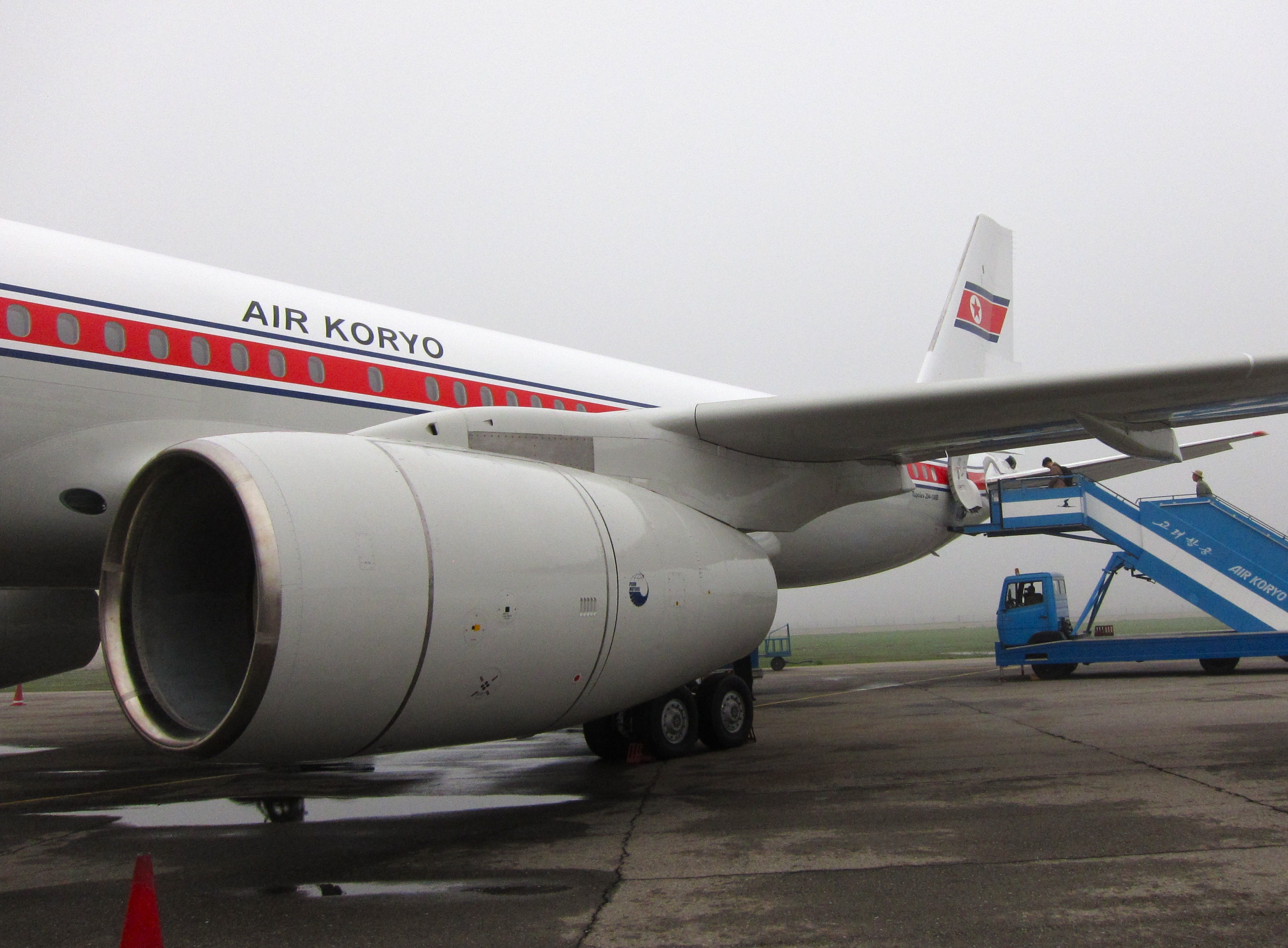
An Air Koryo Tu-204-300

It incorporates many firsts in a one-of-a-kind Russian engine with advanced technology features such as

- High-bypass turbofan design for economy
- Integrated exhaust with exhaust mixer for good efficiency
- Acoustically treated exhaust duct for low noise
- Full-authority digital engine control (FADEC)
- Long service life based on on-condition maintenance
- Modular design for ease of maintenance

It was first certified in 1992 and has been in service since.

== Variants ==
There are several variants: the basic PS-90A, the PS-90A-76, and the improved PS-90A versions. The latter include the PS-90A1, PS-90A2, PS-90A-42 and the PS-90A3 engines.

=== PS-90A ===
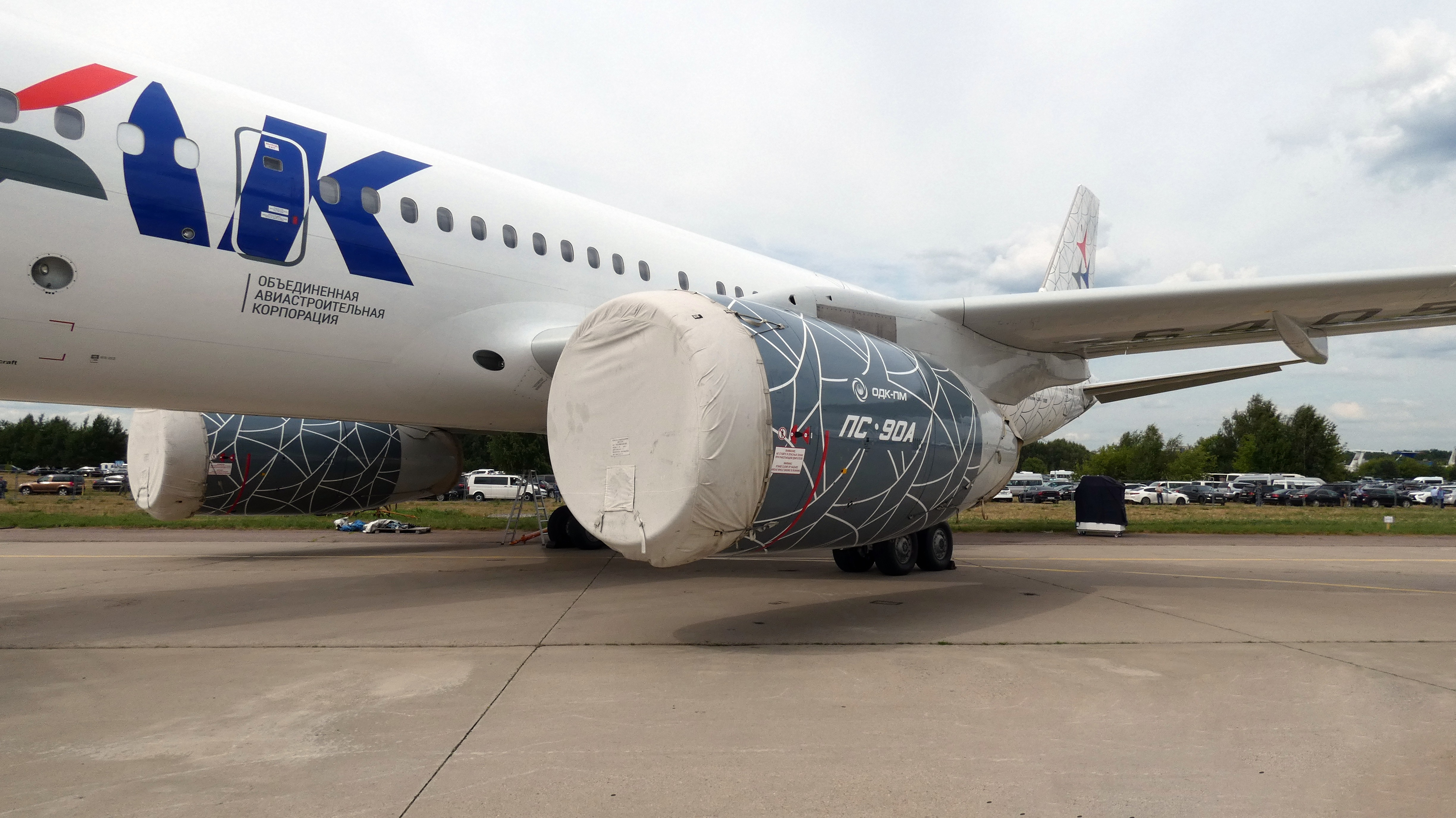
PS-90A on MAKS-2021

The PS-90A engine is the initial variant and is standard equipment for Ilyushin Il-96-300, Tupolev Tu-204-100 and Tupolev Tu-214. PS-90A is rated nominally at 16000 kgf (157 kN, 35,300 lbf) thrust, 13.3% less than the Rolls-Royce RB211-535E4 engine (which is also offered on the Tu-204), and the fuel consumption is 8.2% less than it.

=== PS-90A-76 ===
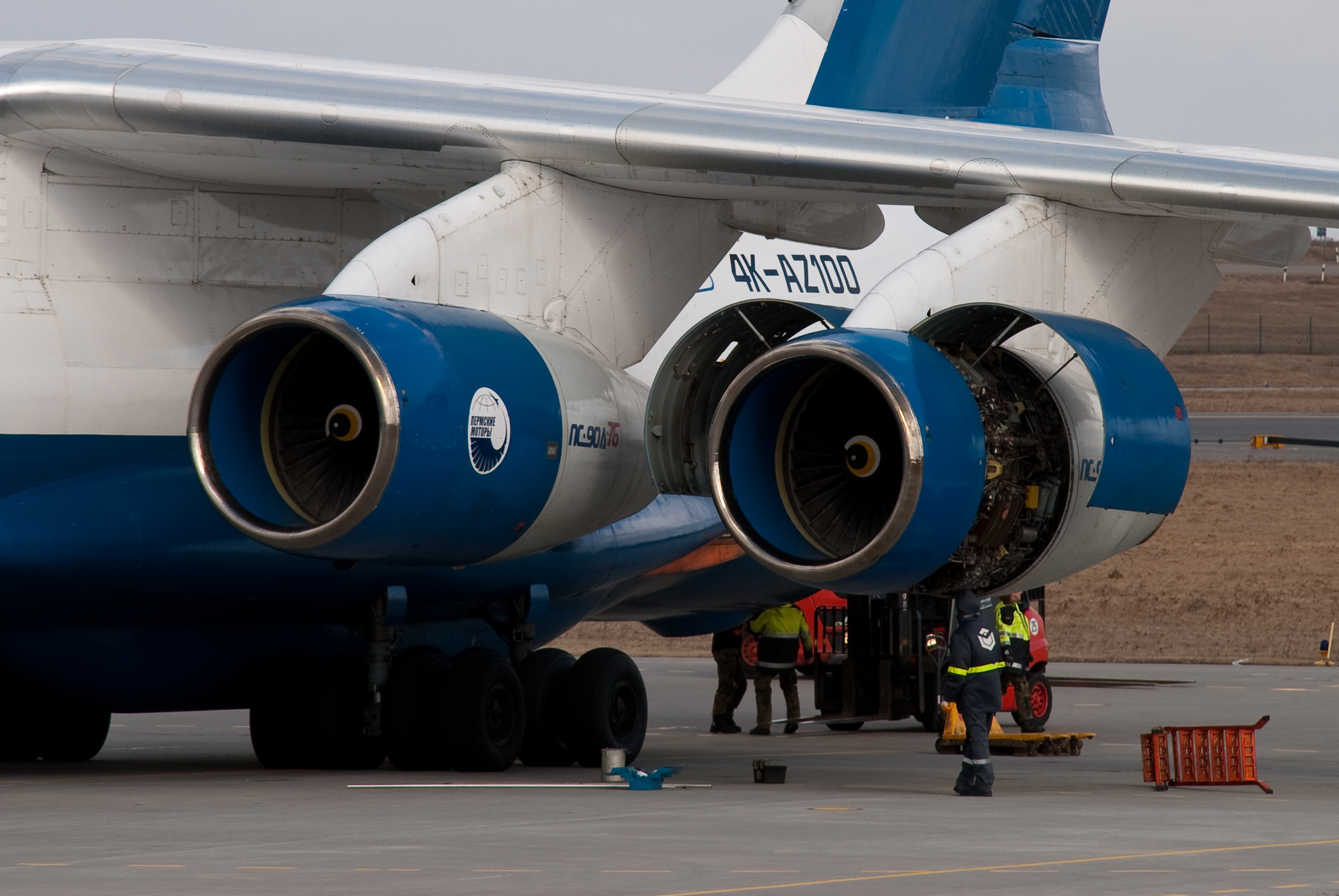
A pair of PS-90A-76 engines on the Il-76.

This variant is a modification of the basic PS-90A engine. It is rated nominally up to 14,500 kgf (142 kN, 32,000 lbf) take-off thrust.

By replacing the D-30KP on the older Il-76, the service life of the aircraft can be extended. Fuel efficiency, and performance will be markedly improved and noise pollution reduced to comply with the new strict requirements. With the large fleet of both civil and military Il-76 aircraft still in operation, a potentially large market exists for engine replacement. An example of such a modified version is the Il-76MD-90. The PS-90A-76 is the standard on the newly built, modernized versions of the Il-76, such as the Il-76MD-90A and the Il-76MF.

=== PS-90A1 ===
This variant is also a modification of the basic PS-90A engine. It was certified in 2007 and is offered as an option on the IL-96-400T aircraft.

=== PS-90A2 ===
The PS-90A2 is an advanced derivative of the PS-90A, developed in cooperation with Pratt & Whitney. It has a fair proportion of western components from France, Germany, Sweden and the US. It is also lighter than PS-90A and features improved FADEC. These features improve the performance and reduce maintenance costs by 40%. Fuel consumption is on par with current western engines, and its noise levels are below the current regulatory requirements. The PS-90A2 is the first Russian engine to be ETOPS-180 min rated. It is offered in newly built aircraft and is completely interchangeable with the PS-90A, allowing simple upgrades on present airliners.

It has the same thrust rating as the PS-90A, 16000 kgf (157 kN, 35,300 lbf) thrust. It is also capable of 18000 kgf (176 kN, 39,600 lbf) thrust.

Future American involvement in engine development has been put in doubt after attempts to block sale of PS-90A2 engines to an Iranian customer.

=== PS-90A-42 ===
This is a version of the PS-90A2 intended for the Beriev A-42 search and rescue aircraft.

=== PS-90A3 ===
According to the manufacturer, it is a modification of the PS-90A2. It was certified in January 2011 and intended to power the Tupolev Tu-204SM aircraft. It is unclear whether the US and European components of the PS-90A2 remain or whether they have been replaced by Russian ones. If the US components have indeed been replaced, then this engine could be fitted to the Tu-204SM ordered by Iran Air and its subsidiaries.

=== Gas turbines ===
- GTE-25P, GTU-25P unit
- Gas turbine PS-90GP-2 derivative of PS90A2

== Specifications (PS-90A1) ==
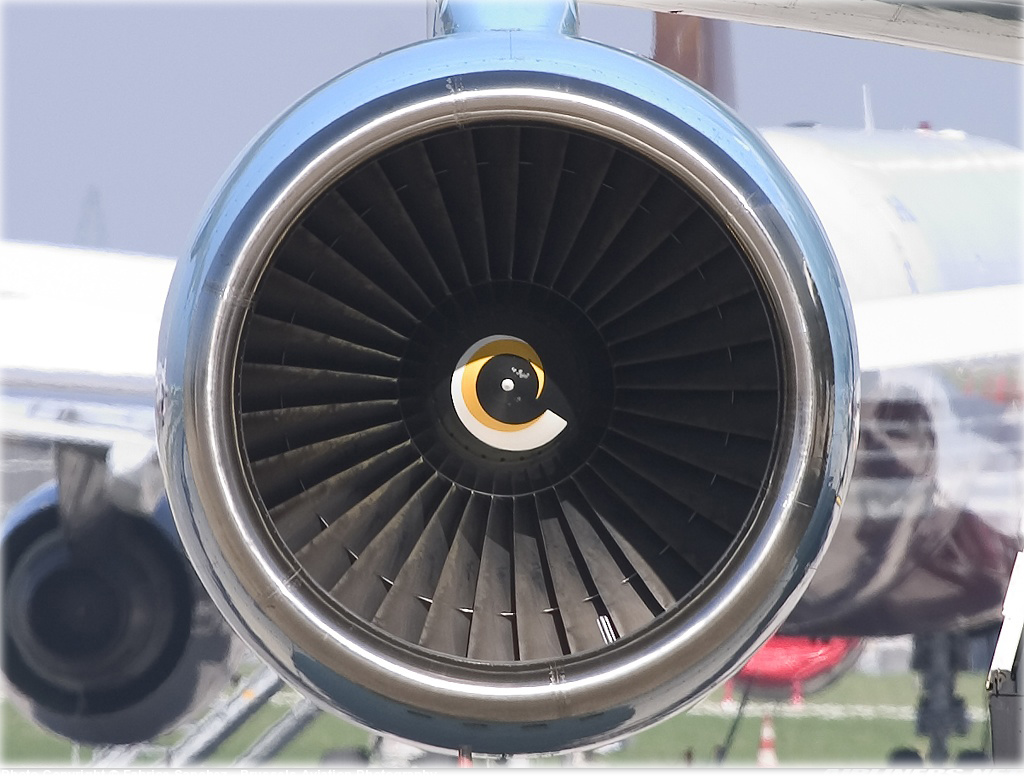
PS-90 mounted on an Ilyushin Il-96

Data from Aviadvigatel Perm Engine.

==== General characteristics ====
- Type: Twin-spool high bypass turbofan with a single-stage fan
- Length: 4,964 mm (195.4 in)
- Diameter: 1,900 mm (75 in) (fan diameter)
- Dry weight: 2,950 kg (6,500 lb)

==== Components ====
- Compressor: 4-stage LP, 13-stage HP
- Combustors: Fully annular
- Turbine: 2-stage HP, 4-stage LP

==== Performance ====
- Maximum thrust: 17,400 kgf; 38,400 lbf (171 kN)
- Bypass ratio: 5.4
- Fuel consumption: 0.595 kg/kgf hour
- Thrust-to-weight ratio: 5.9

== See also ==
Comparable engines

- CFM International CFM56
- General Electric CF6
- Pratt & Whitney PW2000
- Pratt & Whitney PW4000
- Rolls-Royce RB211-535

Related lists

- List of aircraft engines
