= Soloviev D-20 =

D-20
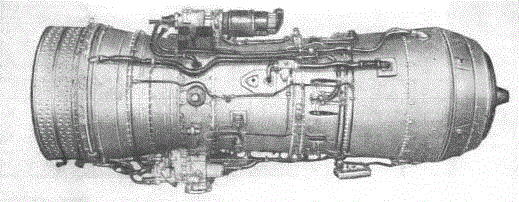
- Left side view of the Soloviev D-20 engine
- Type: Turbofan
- Manufacturer: Soloviev Design Bureau
- Major applications: Tupolev Tu-124

The Soloviev D-20P, built by the Soloviev Design Bureau, was a low-bypass turbofan engine rated at 52.9 kN (11,900 lbf) thrust used on the Tupolev Tu-124. Elements of the design were used in the development of the larger Soloviev D-30 family of low and medium bypass engines.

== Specifications ==
Data from Gunston and Jane's.

==== General characteristics ====
- Type: Twin-spool turbofan engine
- Length: 330.4 cm (130 in)
- Diameter: 97.6 cm (38.3 in)
- Dry weight: 1,468 kg (3,236 lb)

==== Components ====
- Compressor: Three-stage LP, eight-stage HP, axial flow
- Combustors: 12-chamber cannular
- Turbine: Two-stage LP turbine, single-stage HP turbine
- Fuel type: Avtur

==== Performance ====
- Maximum thrust: 5,400 kgf (53,000 N; 12,000 lbf)
- Overall pressure ratio: 13:1
- Bypass ratio: 1:1
- Air mass flow: 113 kg/s (249 lb/s) at 8,550 rpm
- Specific fuel consumption: 0.72 (Max take-off) 0.9 (cruise)
- Thrust-to-weight ratio: 3.7

== See also ==
Comparable engines

- Rolls Royce Spey

Related lists

- List of aircraft engines
