= Bypass ratio =

Proportion of ducted compared to combusted air in a turbofan engine

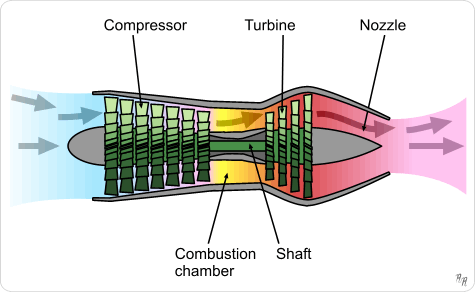
Schematic turbofan engines. The high-bypass engine (top) has a single-stage fan that routes most of its air along the outside of a gas generator (core); the low-bypass engine (middle) has a several-stage fan routing less of its air outside the core; the bottom schematic shows the core with no bypass, an engine in its own right (turbojet)

The bypass ratio (BPR) of a turbofan engine is the ratio between the mass flow rate of the bypass stream to the mass flow rate entering the core. A 10:1 bypass ratio, for example, means that 10 kg of air passes through the bypass duct for every 1 kg of air passing through the core.

Turbofan engines are usually described in terms of BPR, which together with engine pressure ratio, turbine inlet temperature and fan pressure ratio are important design parameters. In addition, BPR is quoted for turboprop and unducted fan installations because their high propulsive efficiency gives them the overall efficiency characteristics of very high bypass turbofans. This allows them to be shown together with turbofans on plots which show trends of reducing specific fuel consumption (SFC) with increasing BPR. BPR is also quoted for lift fan installations where the fan airflow is remote from the engine and doesn't physically touch the engine core.

Bypass provides a lower fuel consumption for the same thrust, measured as thrust specific fuel consumption (grams/second fuel per unit of thrust in kN using SI units). Lower fuel consumption that comes with high bypass ratios applies to turboprops, using a propeller rather than a ducted fan. High bypass designs are the dominant type for commercial passenger aircraft and both civilian and military jet transports.

Business jets use medium BPR engines.

Combat aircraft use engines with low bypass ratios to compromise between fuel economy and the requirements of combat: high power-to-weight ratios, supersonic performance, and the ability to use afterburners.

== Principles ==
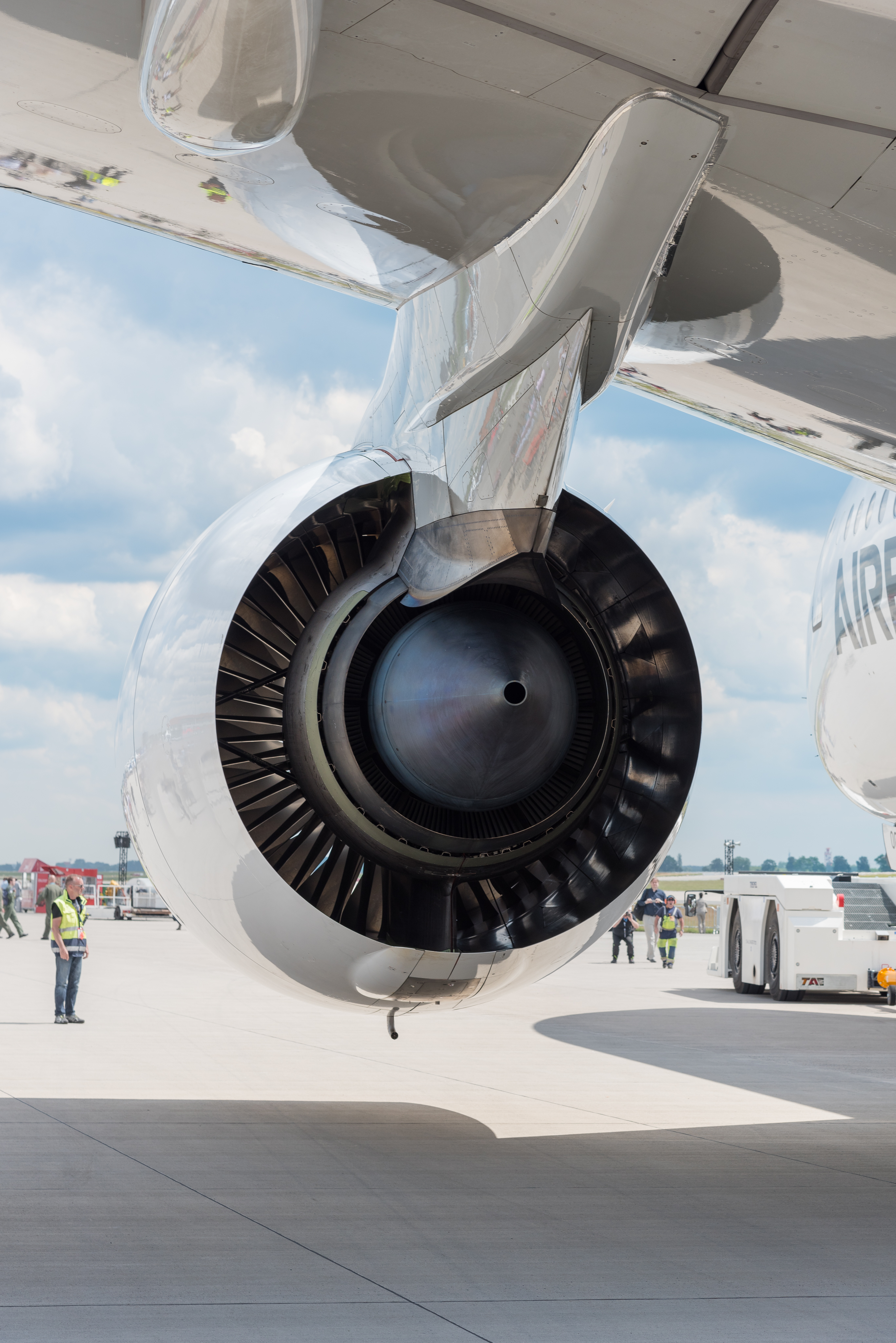
The Rolls-Royce Trent XWB powering the Airbus A350, having its core and its bypass duct observable from this view.

If all the gas power from a gas turbine is converted to kinetic energy in a propelling nozzle, the aircraft is best suited to high supersonic speeds. If it is all transferred to a separate large mass of air with low kinetic energy, the aircraft is best suited to zero speed (hovering). For speeds in between, the gas power is shared between a separate airstream and the gas turbine's own nozzle flow in a proportion which gives the aircraft performance required. The first jet aircraft were subsonic and the poor suitability of the propelling nozzle for these speeds due to high fuel consumption was understood, and bypass proposed, as early as 1936 (U.K. Patent 471,368). The underlying principle behind bypass is trading exhaust velocity for extra mass flow which still gives the required thrust but uses less fuel. Turbojet inventor Frank Whittle called it "gearing down the flow". Power is transferred from the gas generator to an extra mass of air, i.e. a larger diameter propelling jet, moving more slowly. The bypass spreads the available mechanical power across more air to reduce the velocity of the jet. The trade-off between mass flow and velocity is also seen with propellers and helicopter rotors by comparing disc loading and power loading. For example, the same helicopter weight can be supported by a high power engine and small diameter rotor or, for less fuel, a lower power engine and bigger rotor with lower velocity through the rotor.

Bypass usually refers to transferring gas power from a gas turbine to a bypass stream of air to reduce fuel consumption and jet noise. Alternatively, there may be a requirement for an afterburning engine where the sole requirement for bypass is to provide cooling air. This sets the lower limit for BPR and these engines have been called "leaky" or continuous bleed turbojets (General Electric YJ-101 BPR 0.25) and low BPR turbojets (Pratt & Whitney PW1120). Low BPR (0.2) has also been used to provide surge margin as well as afterburner cooling for the Pratt & Whitney J58.

== Description ==
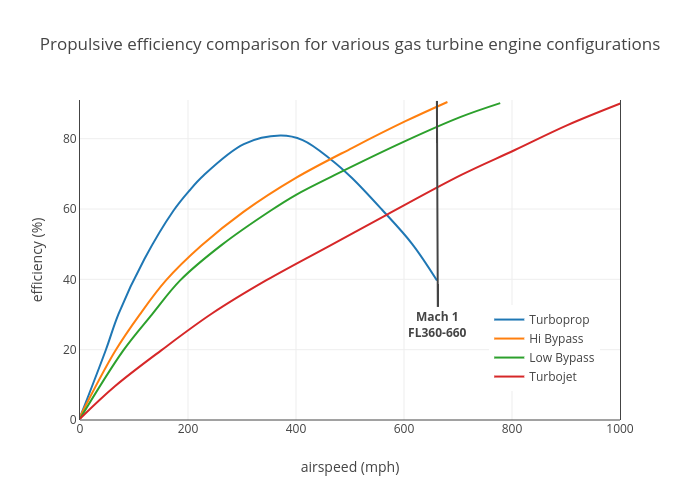
Propulsive efficiency comparison for various gas turbine engine configurations

In a zero-bypass (turbojet) engine the high temperature and high pressure exhaust gas is accelerated by expansion through a propelling nozzle and produces all the thrust. The compressor absorbs all the mechanical power produced by the turbine. In a bypass design, extra turbines drive a ducted fan that accelerates air rearward from the front of the engine. In a high-bypass design, the ducted fan and nozzle produce most of the thrust. Turbofans are closely related to turboprops in principle because both transfer some of the gas turbine's gas power, using extra machinery, to a bypass stream leaving less for the hot nozzle to convert to kinetic energy. Turbofans represent an intermediate stage between turbojets, which derive all their thrust from exhaust gases, and turbo-props which derive minimal thrust from exhaust gases (typically 10% or less). Extracting shaft power and transferring it to a bypass stream introduces extra losses which are more than made up by the improved propulsive efficiency. The turboprop at its best flight speed gives significant fuel savings over a turbojet even though an extra turbine, a gearbox and a propeller were added to the turbojet's low-loss propelling nozzle. The turbofan has additional losses from its extra turbines, fan, bypass duct and extra propelling nozzle compared to the turbojet's single nozzle.

To see the influence of increasing BPR alone on overall efficiency in the aircraft, i.e. SFC, a common gas generator has to be used, i.e. no change in Brayton cycle parameters or component efficiencies. Bennett shows in this case a relatively slow rise in losses transferring power to the bypass at the same time as a fast drop in exhaust losses with a significant improvement in SFC. In reality increases in BPR over time come along with rises in gas generator efficiency masking, to some extent, the influence of BPR.

Only the limitations of weight and materials (e.g., the strengths and melting points of materials in the turbine) reduce the efficiency at which a turbofan gas turbine converts this thermal energy into mechanical energy, for while the exhaust gases may still have available energy to be extracted, each additional stator and turbine disk retrieves progressively less mechanical energy per unit of weight, and increasing the compression ratio of the system by adding to the compressor stage to increase overall system efficiency increases temperatures at the turbine face. Nevertheless, high-bypass engines have a high propulsive efficiency because even slightly increasing the velocity of a very large volume and consequently mass of air produces a very large change in momentum and thrust: thrust is the engine's mass flow (the amount of air flowing through the engine) multiplied by the difference between the inlet and exhaust velocities in—a linear relationship—but the kinetic energy of the exhaust is the mass flow multiplied by one-half the square of the difference in velocities. A low disc loading (thrust per disc area) increases the aircraft's energy efficiency, and this reduces the fuel use.

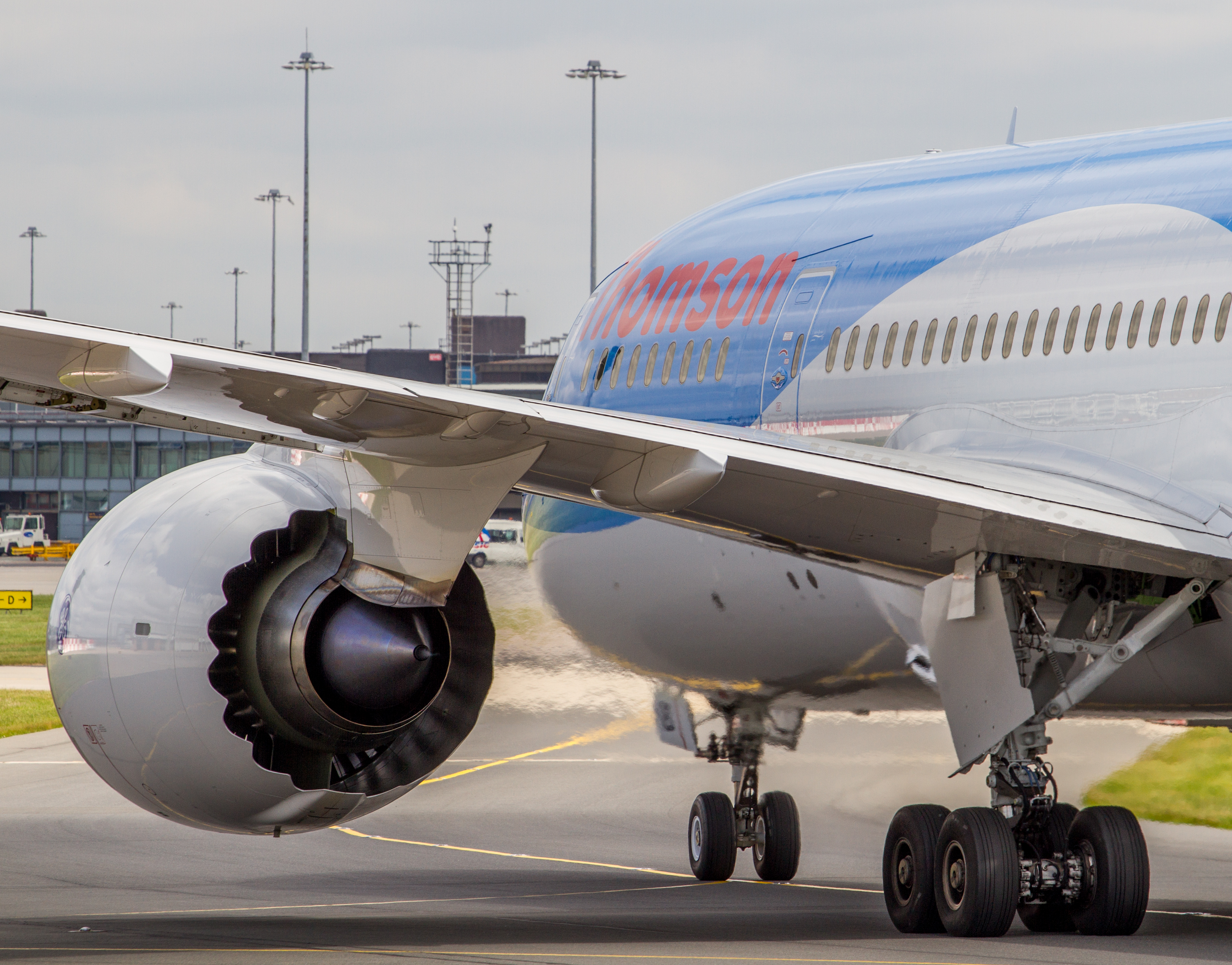
A high-bypass General Electric GEnx-1B powering the Boeing 787 Dreamliner, with the hot exhaust observable flowing from the engine's core

The Rolls–Royce Conway turbofan engine, developed in the early 1950s, was an early example of a bypass engine. The configuration was similar to a 2-spool turbojet but to make it into a bypass engine it was equipped with an oversized low pressure compressor: the flow through the inner portion of the compressor blades went into the core while the outer portion of the blades blew air around the core to provide the rest of the thrust. The bypass ratio for the Conway varied between 0.3 and 0.6 depending on the variant

The growth of bypass ratios during the 1960s gave jetliners fuel efficiency that could compete with that of piston-powered planes. Today (2015), most jet engines have some bypass. Modern engines in slower aircraft, such as airliners, have bypass ratios up to 12:1; in higher-speed aircraft, such as fighters, bypass ratios are much lower, around 1.5; and craft designed for speeds up to Mach 2 and somewhat above have bypass ratios below 0.5.

Turboprops have bypass ratios of 50-100, although the propulsion airflow is less clearly defined for propellers than for fans and propeller airflow is slower than the airflow from turbofan nozzles.

=== Engine bypass ratios ===
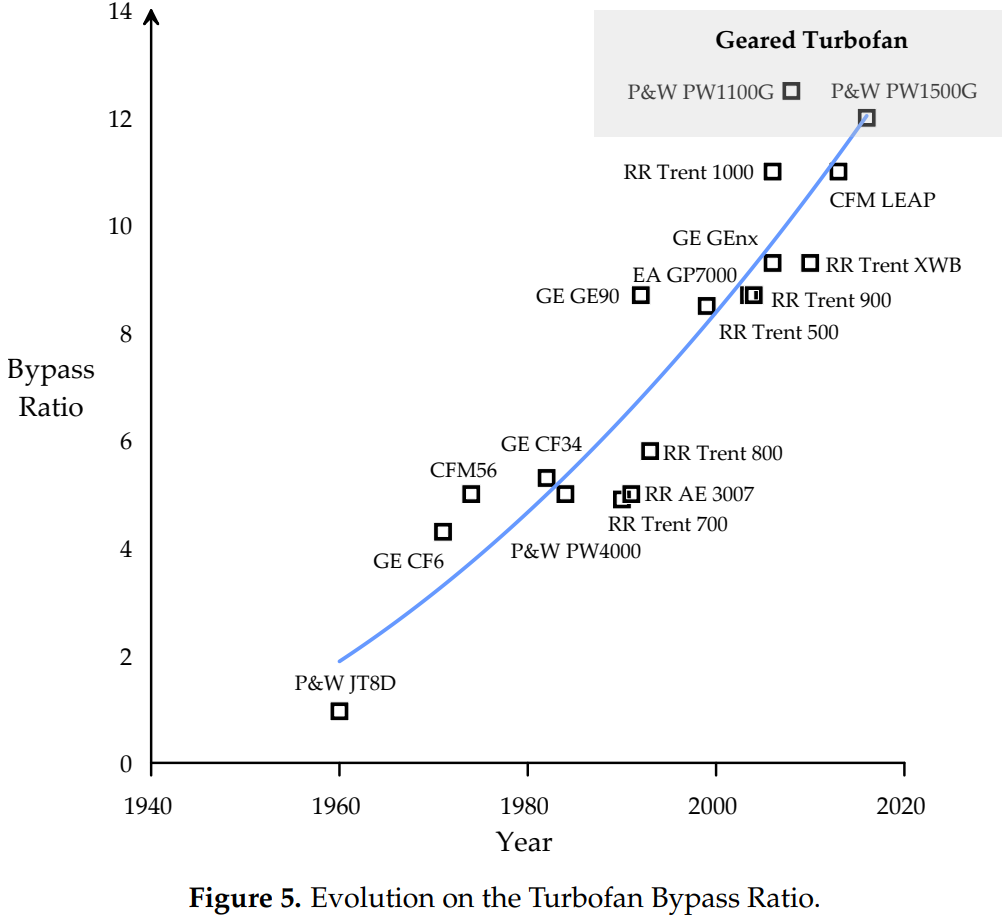
Turbofan Bypass Ratio Evolution

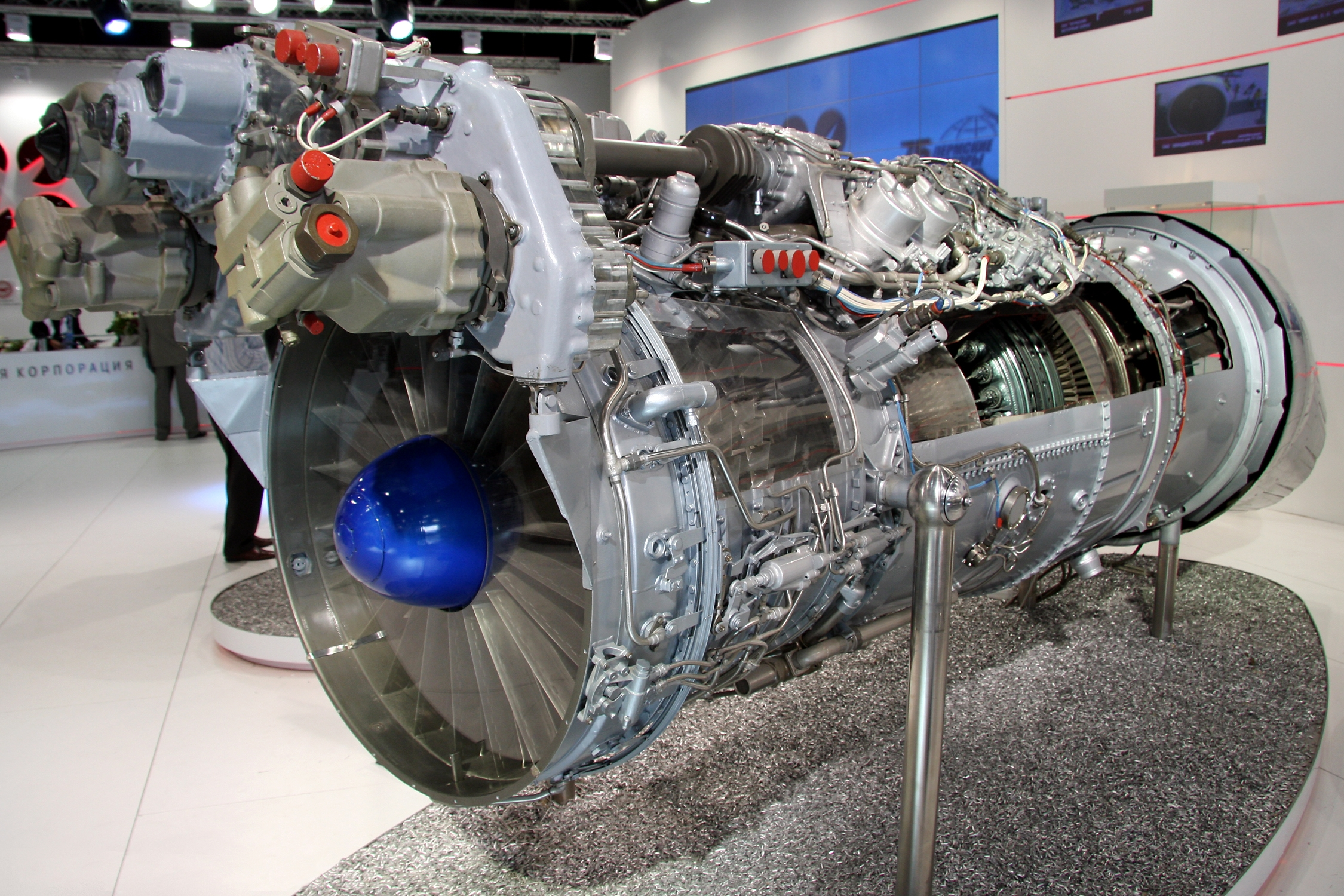
Combat aircraft are powered by low-bypass engines, such as this Saturn AL-31, which had a BPR lower than 1.

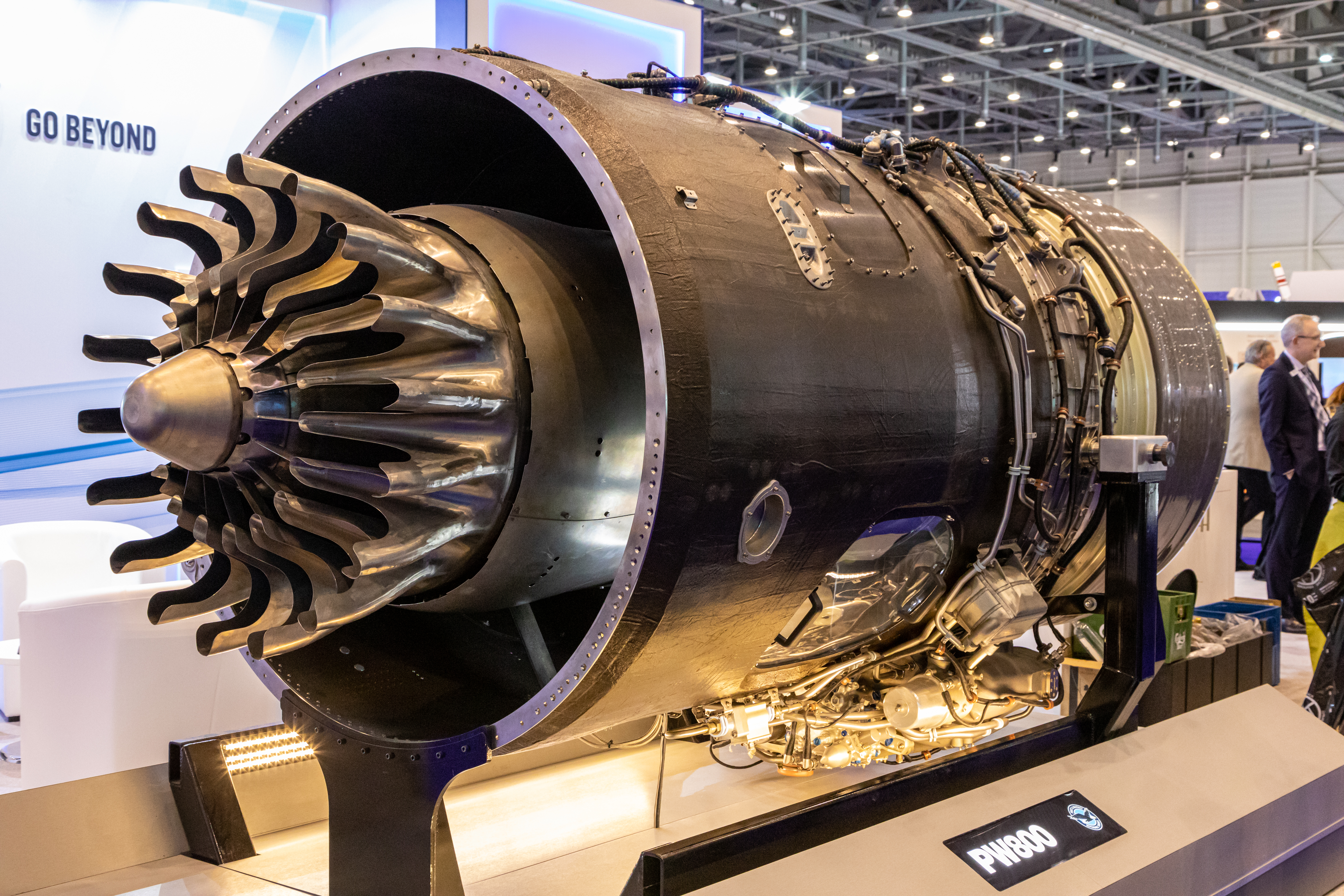
Most business jets, regional jets, and small-sized commercial jetliners use engines with medium-to-high BPR. A PW800 showing the relative sizes of core exhaust and bypass duct for a BPR of 5.5.

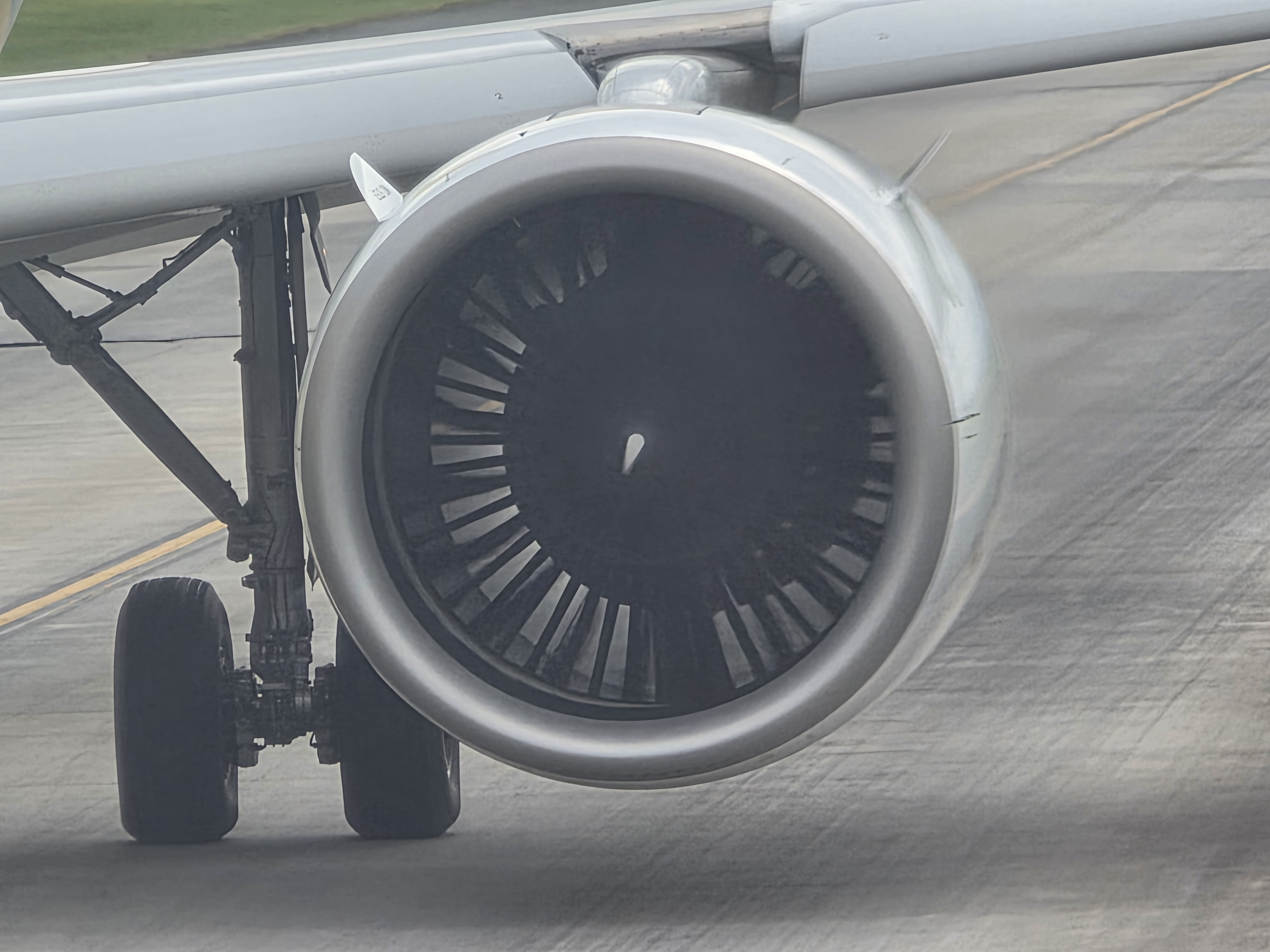
The PW1000G series showing the relative areas for bypass and core flow for a 12:1 bypass ratio.

Turbofan engines
Model	First	BPR	Thrust	Major applications
P&W PW1000G	2008	9.0–12.5	67–160 kN	A320neo, A220, E-Jets E2, Irkut MC-21
R-R Trent 1000	2006	10.8–11	265.3–360.4 kN	B787
R-R Trent 7000	2014	10.0	324 kN	A330neo
GE GE9X	2016	10.0	489.3 kN	B777X
CFM LEAP	2013	9.0–11.0	100–146 kN	A320neo, B737Max, Comac C919
GE GE90	1992	8.7–9.9	330–510 kN	B777
R-R Trent XWB	2010	9.6	330–430 kN	A350XWB
GE GEnx	2006	8.0–9.3	296-339 kN	B747-8, B787
EA GP7000	2004	8.7	311–363 kN	A380
R-R Trent 900	2004	8.7	340–357 kN	A380
R-R Trent 500	1999	8.5	252 kN	A340-500/600
GE TF39	1964	8.0		Lockheed C-5 Galaxy
CFM56	1974	5.0–6.6	97.9-151 kN	A320, A340-200/300, B737, KC-135, DC-8
P&W PW4000	1984	4.8–6.4	222–436 kN	A300/A310, A330, B747, B767, B777, MD-11
GE CF34	1982	5.3–6.3	41–82.3 kN	Challenger 600, CRJ, E-jets
R-R Trent 800	1993	5.7–5.79	411–425 kN	B777
GE Passport	2013	5.6	78.9–84.2 kN	Global 7000/8000
P&WC PW800	2012	5.5	67.4–69.7 kN	Gulfstream G500/G600
GE CF6	1971	4.3–5.3	222–298 kN	A300/A310, A330, B747, B767, MD-11, DC-10
D-36	1977	5.6	63.75 kN	Yak-42, An-72, An-74
PS-90	1992	5.4	157–171 kN	Il-76, Il-96, Tu-204
P&W JT9D	1966	5.0	193-250 kN	747-100/200/300, 767-200/300, A310, DC-10-40
R-R AE 3007	1991	5.0	33.7 kN	ERJ, Citation X
R-R Trent 700	1990	4.9	320 kN	A330
IAE V2500	1987	4.4–4.9	97.9-147 kN	A320, MD-90
P&W PW6000	2000	4.90	100.2 kN	Airbus A318
R-R BR700	1994	4.2–4.5	68.9–102.3 kN	B717, Global Express, Gulfstream V
P&WC PW300	1988	3.8–4.5	23.4–35.6 kN	Cit. Sovereign, G200, F. 7X, F. 2000
HW HTF7000	1999	4.4	28.9 kN	Challenger 300, G280, Legacy 500
PowerJet SaM146	2008	4.4:1	71.6–79.2 kN	Sukhoi Superjet 100
Williams FJ44	1985	3.3–4.1	6.7–15.6 kN	CitationJet, Cit. M2
P&WC PW500	1993	3.90	13.3 kN	Citation Excel, Phenom 300
HW TFE731	1970	2.66–3.9	15.6–22.2 kN	Learjet 70/75, G150, Falcon 900
R-R Tay	1984	3.1–3.2	61.6–68.5 kN	Gulfstream IV, Fokker 70/100
GE-H HF120	2009	2.9	7.4 kN	HondaJet
P&WC PW600	2001	1.83–2.80	6.0 kN	Cit. Mustang, Eclipse 500, Phenom 100
Soloviev D-30KU	1971	2.42		Il-62M, Tu-154M
Soloviev D-30KP	1971	2.24		Il-76, Il-78, Y-20A, H-6
GE F101	1973	2.1		B-1
P&WC JT15D	1967	2.0-3.3		Hawker 400, Citation I, Citation II, Citation V
GE CF700	1964	2.0		Falcon 20, Sabreliner 75A,
P&W JT8D-200	1979	1.74		MD-80, 727 Super 27
P&W JT3D	1958	1.42		707-130B, 707-320B, DC-8-50, DC-8-60
Kuznetsov NK-32	1982	1.4		Tu-160, Tu-144LL
Soloviev D-30	1963	1.0		Tu-134, Su-47, MiG-31, M-55
Soloviev D-20	1959	1.0		Tu-124
P&W JT8D	1960	0.96		DC-9, 727, 737 Original
GE F110-100/400	1980-1984	0.87		F-16 (-100), F-14B/D (-400)
R-R Turbomeca Adour	1968	0.75-0.80		T-45, Hawk, Jaguar
GE F110-129	Mid-1980s	0.76		F-16, F-15EX
P&W F100-220	1986	0.71	105.7 kN	F-15, F-16
GE F110-132	2003-2005	0.68		F-16 Blk.60
R-R Spey	1964	0.64		Trident, 1-11, Gulfstream II/III, Fokker F28
Kuznetsov NK-144	1964	0.60	191 kN	Tu-144S
P&W F135	2006	0.57	191 kN	F-35
Saturn AL-31	1985	0.56		Su-27, Su-30, J-10
Klimov RD-33	1974	0.49	81.3 kN	MiG-29
Honeywell/ITEC F124	1979	0.49		L-159, M-346
P&W F119	1996	0.45		F-22 Raptor
Eurojet EJ200	1991	0.40		Typhoon
P&W F100-229	1989	0.36	129.7 kN	F-16, F-15
GE F404	1978	0.34		F/A-18, T-50, F-117
R-R Conway	1952	0.30		707-420, DC-8-40, VC-10, Victor
GE F414	1993	0.25		F/A-18E/F
Turbojets		0.0		early jet aircraft, Concorde

== See also ==
- Index of aviation articles
- Bypass tube
