= Shvetsov ASh-2 =

1940s Soviet piston aircraft engine

ASh-2
- Type: Radial engine
- National origin: Soviet Union
- Manufacturer: Shvetsov OKB-19 in Perm'
- First run: 1946
- Developed from: Shvetsov ASh-82

The Shvetsov ASh-2 (Russian: Швецов АШ-2) was a 28-cylinder, air-cooled, radial aircraft engine designed in the Soviet Union in the late 1940s. It was inferior to the Dobrynin VD-4K engine and did not enter production. One of the problems was air-cooling which ate up to 50% of the total engine power at 15000 meters. In contrast, the liquid-cooled VD-4K required only 5% of power for cooling at the same altitude.

== Specifications (ASh-2) ==
Data from Kotelnikov, p. 252

=== General characteristics ===
- Type: 28-cylinder, 4-row radial engine
- Bore: 155.5 mm (6.122 in)
- Stroke: 155.0 mm (6.102 in)
- Displacement: 82.4 L (5,028 cu in)
- Dry weight: 1,850 kg (4,078 lbs)

=== Components ===
- Supercharger: single-stage, single-speed geared supercharger
- Cooling system: Air-cooled

=== Performance ===
- Power output: 3,500 horsepower (2,600 kW)

== See also ==
Comparable engines

- Pratt & Whitney R-4360 Wasp Major

Related lists

- List of aircraft engines
