= Pavel Solovyov =

Soviet aerospace engineer (1917–1996)

Doctor of Sciences Pavel Solovyov
- Born: Pavel Aleksandrovich Solovyov; June 26, 1917; Alekino, Kineshemsky District, Ivanovo Oblast, Russian Empire
- Died: October 13, 1996 (aged 79); Perm, Russia
- Citizenship: Russian Federation
- Education: Rybinsk Aviation Institute
- Engineering career
- Discipline: Aerospace engineering
- Practice name: Aircraft engine design
- Employer: OKB-19
- Projects: Tupolev Tu-124; Mikoyan MiG-31

Pavel Aleksandrovich Solovyov (Russian: Павел Александрович Соловьёв; June 26, 1917 – October 13, 1996) was a Soviet aerospace engineer born in Alekino in Kineshemsky District of Ivanovo Oblast. He specialised in the design of aircraft engines.

Following the evacuation of the Rybinsk Aviation Institute in 1940, he went to work in Perm, where in 1953 he was made the head of his own design bureau - OKB-19 (now part of Aviadvigatel).

His many awards and decorations included the Lenin Prize (1978), the USSR State Prize (1968), the title Hero of Socialist Labour (1966), four Orders of Lenin, the Order of the October Revolution, the Order of the Red Banner of Labour, the Order of the Red Star and the Medal "For Labour Valour". He was made deputy of the Supreme Soviet of the Soviet Union three times. A street in Perm was named after him, a monument to him was built in Rybinsk.

He died in Perm at the age of 79.
