= Shvetsov ASh-21 =

Soviet radial piston aircraft engine

ASh-21
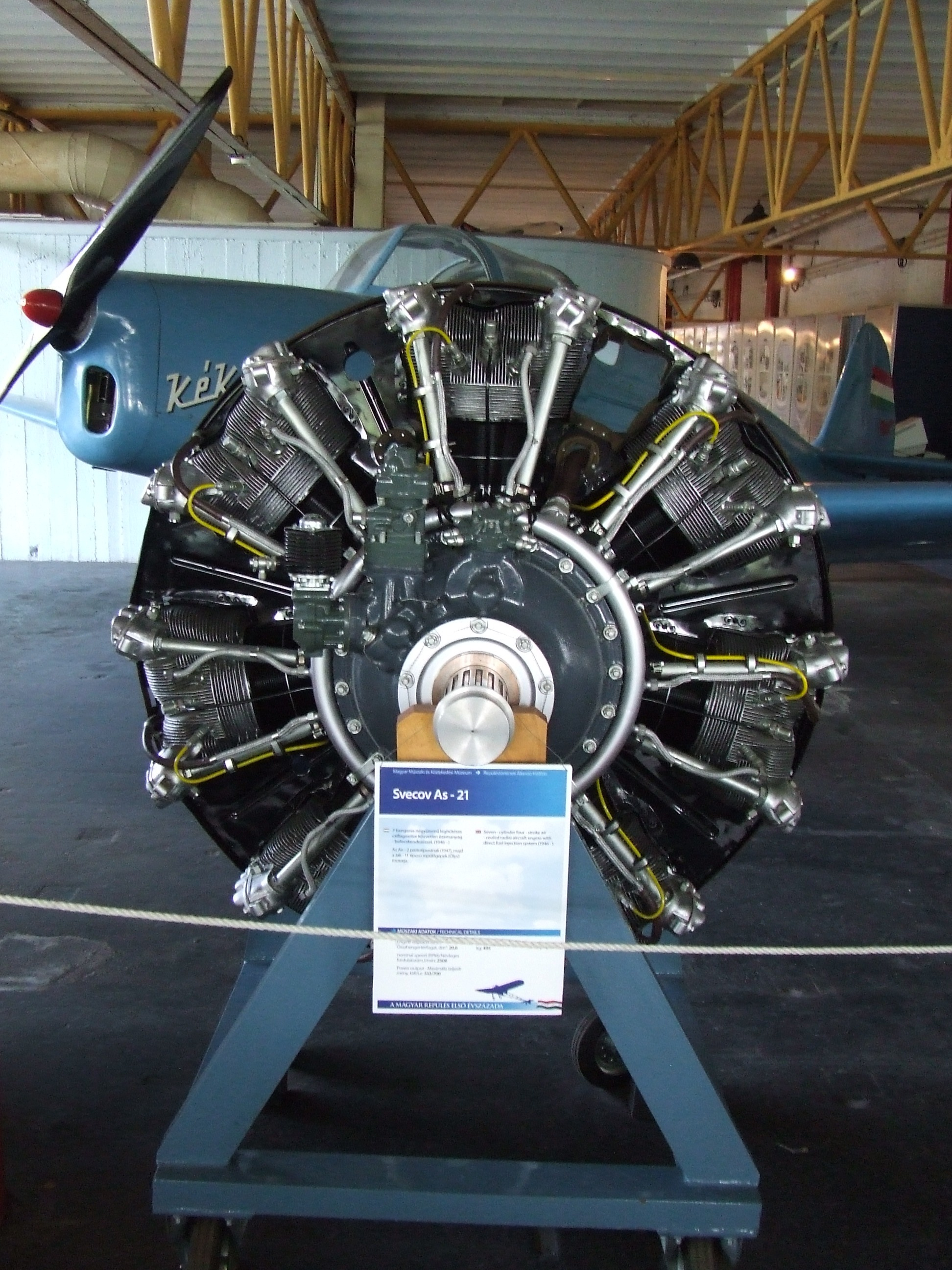
- Type: Radial engine
- Manufacturer: Shvetsov OKB-19 in Perm'
- First run: 1945
- Number built: 7,636
- Developed from: Shvetsov ASh-82

The Shvetsov ASh-21 (Russian: Швецов АШ-21) is a seven-cylinder single-row air-cooled radial aero engine.

== Design and development ==
The ASh-21 is basically a single-row version of the Shvetsov ASh-82. The ASh-21 also incorporates a number of parts from the ASh-62 radial engine. Design began in 1945, and by 1947 testing had finished and production had begun. Between 1947 and 1955 7,636 ASh-21 engines had been built in the USSR and beginning in 1952 it was produced in Czechoslovakia as the M-21.

== Applications ==
- Beriev Be-8
- Beriev Be-30 (prototype)
- Yakovlev Yak-11
- Yakovlev Yak-16

== Specifications (Shvetsov ASh-21) ==
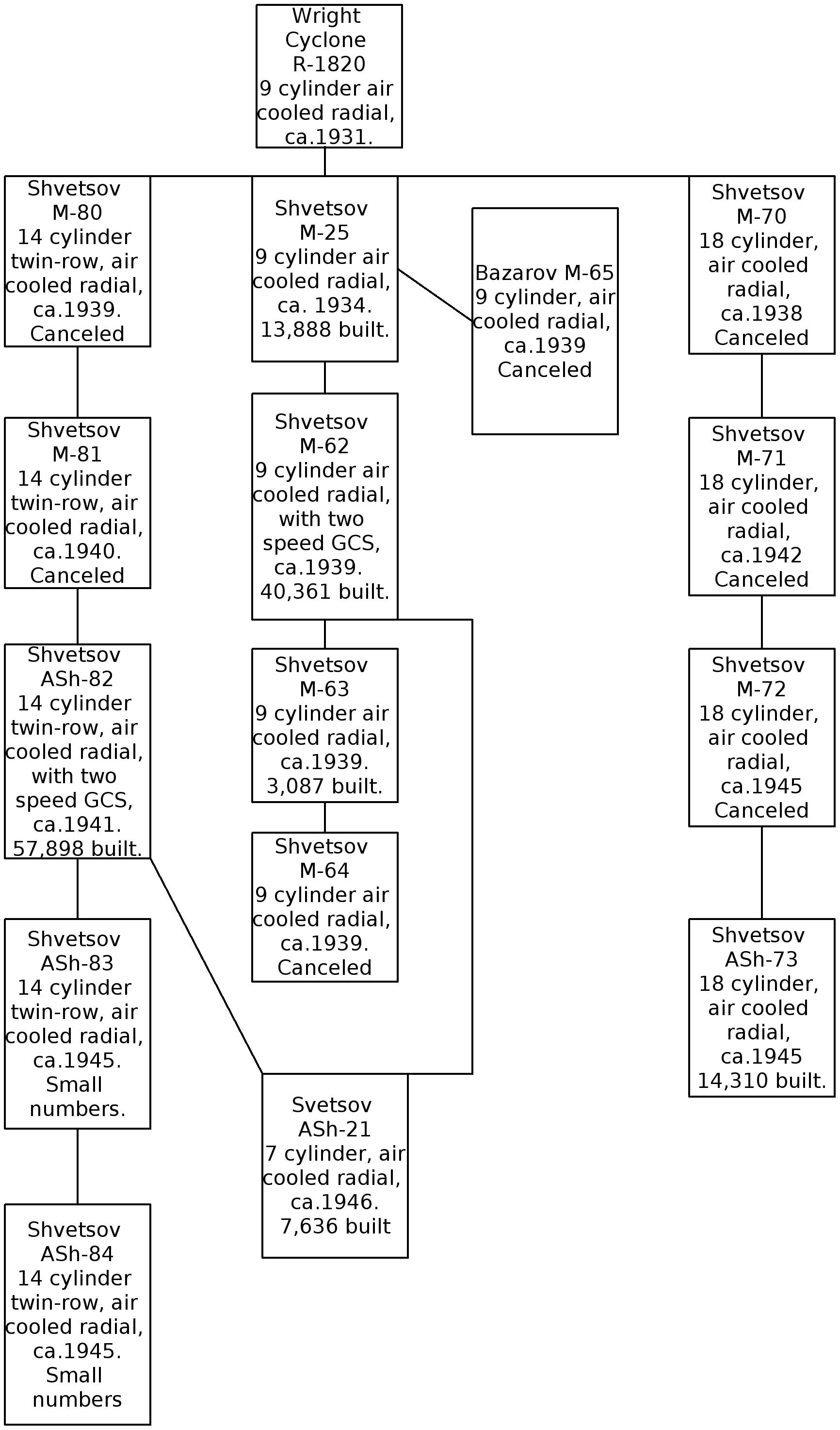
Family tree of Shvetsov engines

=== General characteristics ===
- Type: Seven-cylinder, air-cooled, single-row, radial engine
- Bore: 155.5 mm (6.12 in)
- Stroke: 155 mm (6.10 in)
- Displacement: 20.6 L (1,257 cu in)
- Dry weight: 487 kg (1,074 lb)

=== Components ===
- Supercharger: Single stage, single speed, geared centrifugal supercharger
- Fuel system: Carburetor
- Cooling system: Air

=== Performance ===
- Power output:
- 520 kW (700 hp) at 2,300 rpm takeoff power
- 459 kW (615 hp) at 1,700 m (5,580 ft)
- Specific power: 25.5 kW/L (0.56 hp/in³)
- Compression ratio: 6.4:1
- Power-to-weight ratio: 1.07 kW/kg (0.65 hp/lb)

== See also ==
Comparable engines

- Wright R-1300 Cyclone 7

Related lists

- List of aircraft engines
