= Soloviev D-30 =

Soviet low-bypass turbofan

D-30
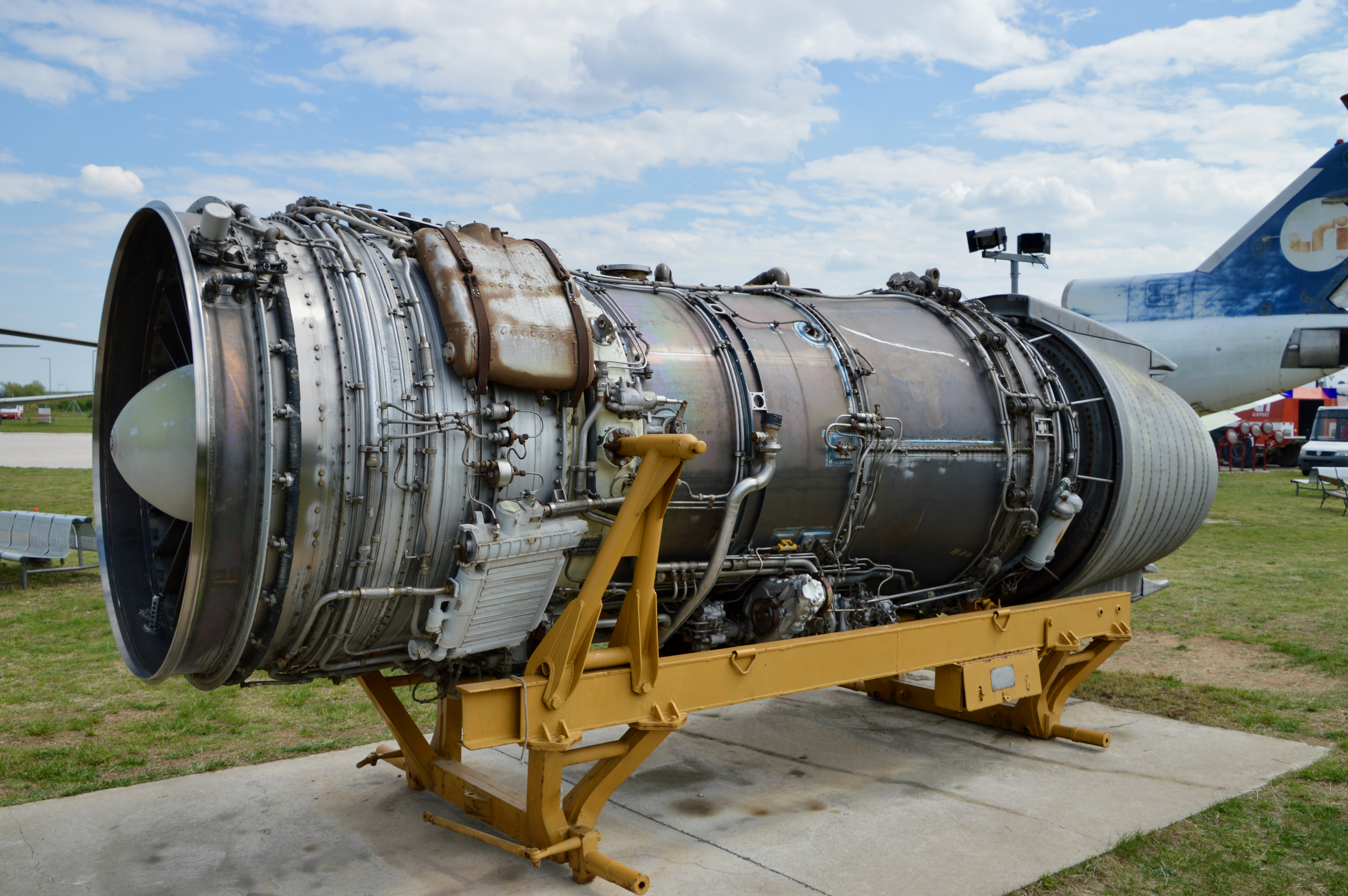
- Type: Turbofan
- National origin: Soviet Union
- Manufacturer: Soloviev Design Bureau
- First run: 1963
- Major applications: Tupolev Tu-134; Tupolev Tu-154; Mikoyan MiG-31; Ilyushin Il-76; Ilyushin Il-62; Sukhoi Su-47
- Developed into: Soloviev D-30K

The Soloviev D-30 (now the Aviadvigatel PS-30) is a Soviet two-shaft low-bypass turbofan engine, officially referred to as a "bypass turbojet". It is one of the most powerful turbofan engines developed in the Soviet Union. Development of the turbofan spurred numerous growth versions with increased fan diameter and modified component arrangements. Developed in a short period of time (about three years), the D-30 turned out to be one of the most reliable engines in the history of Soviet engine development, and it was recognized with the USSR State Prize.

== Design and development ==
The original version of the Soloviev D-30 was developed specifically to power the Tupolev Tu-134 short-to-medium range jet airliner; however, it also served as a base for the development of a family of advanced engines. Engine development was started in the early 60s. By 1966, the engine was put into serial production.

The D-30 engine has a two-stage compression spool, a cannular combustion chamber and a 4-stage turbine, and was the first Soviet-built engine to use cooled turbine blades. The turbine was manufactured using the newest heat-resistant material of the time, along with an exhaust nozzle with a lobe mixer. The technical and efficiency parameters of the D-30 were competitive and similar to those of the Western engines of that period.

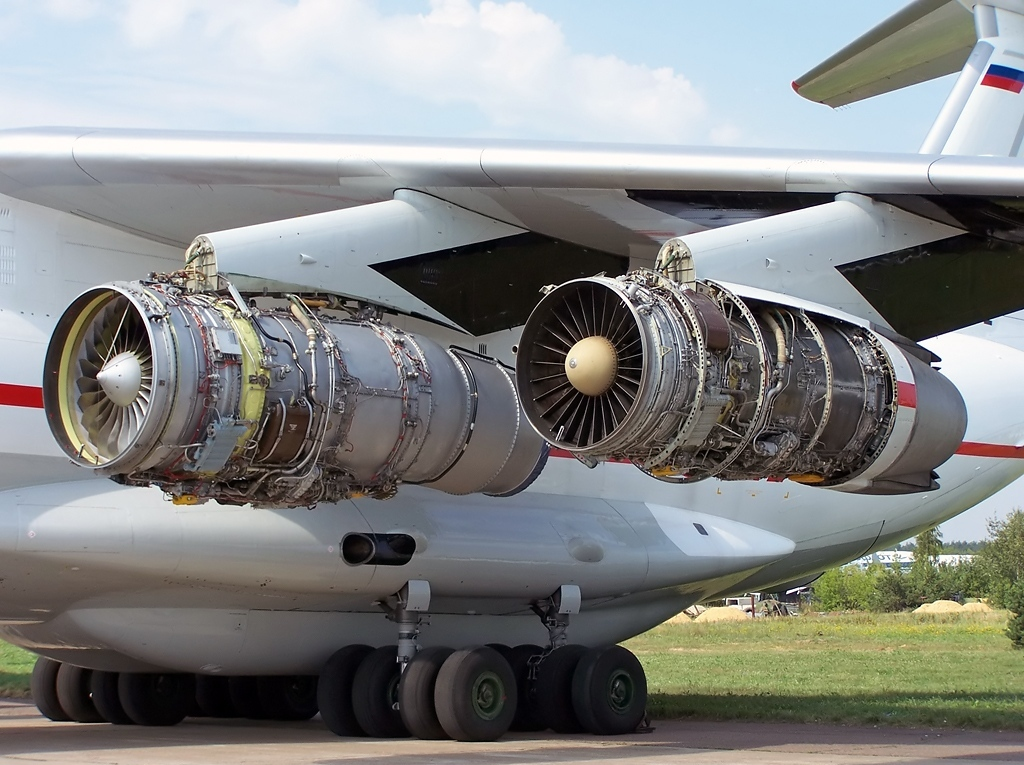
A pair of D-30KP-3 without cowling on an Il-76.

In 1969, an upgraded version, the D-30 engine series II, was created - the main difference being the addition of a thrust reverser and an improved control system. The engine was produced in 1970 through 1987 and was used on the Tu-134FA, Tu-134B, and Tu-134AK aircraft.

In 1980, the D-30 engine series III, a further improvement, was created with the maximum thrust of 6930 kgf (with preserving it at up to до = +C). The number of the engine compressor stages was increased to 5, the gas dynamic stability margin was improved, the system was introduced that protected against engine over-speed and gas temperature overheating. The D-30 engine of the third series was produced between 1983 and 1993. These engines were installed on the Tu-134-A-3, Tu-134B-3, and Tu-134UB-L passenger airliners. The core of the third-series D-30 was also taken as a base point for developing gas turbine plants for the Russian fuel and energy complex.

The Soloviev D-30 was produced in various modifications at the Perm Engine Plant (now JSC UEC-PM). In total, there were about 3000 units of D-30 engines (series I to III) manufactured in this engine plant.

== Variants ==
D-30KU

The D-30KU engine is capable of generating 11,000 kgf at takeoff and was developed in 1971 to replace the Kuznetsov NK-8-4 engine on the Il-62 long-haul airliner, which had some difficulties covering intercontinental routes because of its inadequate range. Ilyushin Design Bureau, the aircraft designer, made the decision to power the aircraft with newer engines which have lower specific fuel consumption. In contrast with the base D-30, the D-30KU has increased bypass ratio and higher turbine inlet temperature: its development was comparable to Pratt & Whitney's development of the JT8D-200 series, but with an even greater increase in thrust. The first compressor spool has 3 stages, the second one has 11 stages, the design of the combustion chamber is however similar to that of D-30. The turbine hot section has a total of 6 stages, the nozzle is common for both flows and has a lobe mixer and a mixing chamber. The D-30KU engine was the first aviation engine in the USSR to include a bucket-type thrust reverser. The Il-62M aircraft equipped with D-30KU had a range extended by 1500 km, compared with the basic model equipped with NK-8-4 engines. A total of 1584 D-30KU engines were manufactured by Rybinsk Engine Plant (now PAO NPO UEC-Saturn) under the authorized supervision of the Perm Design Bureau.

D-30KP

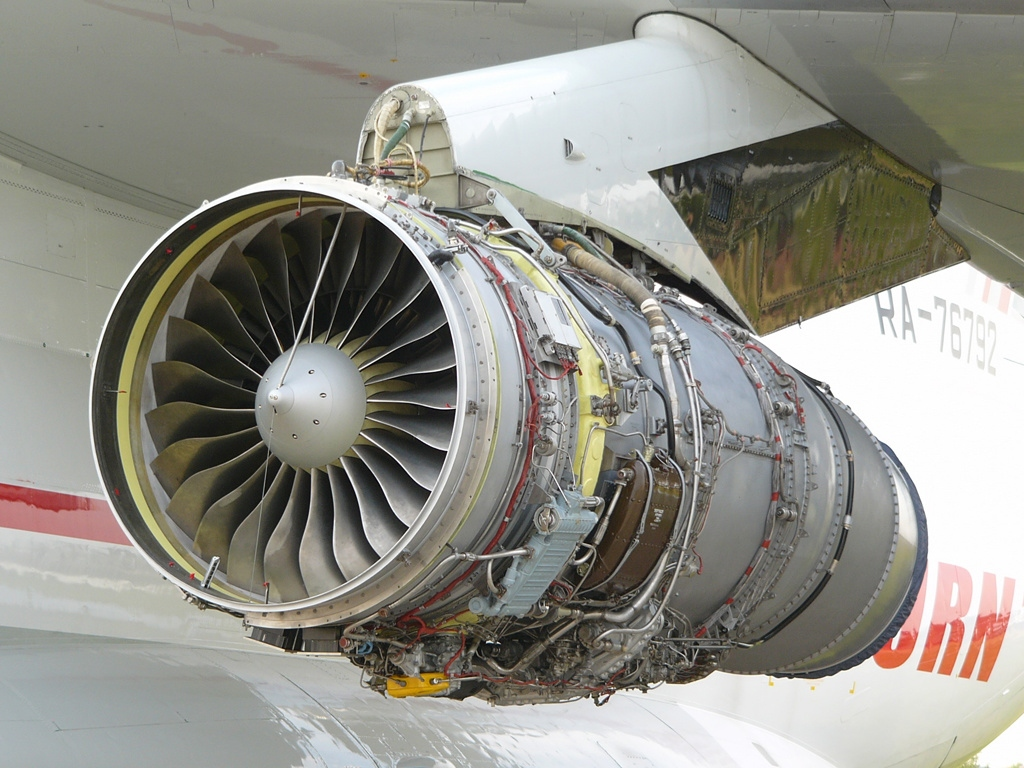
A D-30KP-3 on an experimental Il-76LL with new fan blades and no cowling.

Similar to the D-30KU, a new engine variant called D-30KP which delivered 12,000 kgf of thrust was developed for military transport aircraft Il-76. The development was completed by the end of the 60s. In 1971, Il-76MD with the propulsion unit on the basis of four D-30KP was demonstrated to the country’s leaders. In 1972, engine passed certification tests and then was presented to the public at the next international air show in Le Bourget (France). By 1974 the engine was put into service to power not only military Il-76 itself, but also numerous modifications: tanker plane Il-78, “aircraft-hospital” Il-76MD Scalpel, early warning and control aircraft A-50, weightlessness simulator Il-76K, airborne test rig Il-76LL for in-flight tests of the aircraft engines and others. D-30KP was identical to its predecessor D-30KU - both are low bypass turbofan engines. The engine differs only by having a higher gas temperature at the turbine inlet and an increased compressor pressure ratio and bypass ratio. Powered by four D-30KP engines, Il-76 is capable of lifting a payload of 40 tons (88,000 lb) over a range of 5,000 km (2,700 nmi; 3,100 mi) at cruise speed up to 900 km/h. D-30KP engines were manufactured in the city of Rybinsk (Yaroslavl region) at Rybinsk Engine Production Plant (now NPO UEC-Saturn). The D-30KP engines production continues till present for military supplies. More than 4700 D-30KP engines have been manufactured in total.

The Chinese Xi'an Y-20 prototype was also powered by four D-30KP-2 engines.

D-30KU-154

The successful replacement of the engines on long-haul Il-62 stimulated the leaders of the Ministry of Aviation Industry in the Soviets to re-engine another popular aircraft – the medium-haul passenger airliner Tu-154. Ultimately, Tu-154M powered by D-30KU-154 was the backbone of the civil aviation industry in the Soviets till the end of the 20th century. The D-30KU-154 engine was developed with a maximum thrust of 10,500 kgf specifically to power the Tu-154. Development started in 1979. Pavel Solovyov used the D-30KU core as a starting point. In the course of designing the D-30KU-154 engine, some of the systems were improved, new components were added, and in 1984 the new engine entered serial production. The replacement of Kuznetsov NK-8 engine with the D-30KU-154 engine on Tu-154 allowed the reduction the fuel consumption by 28%! This ultimately defined the profitability of the air transportations industry in the Soviets for another 15 years. During the years of active operation of D-30KU-154, the manufacturer, Perm design bureau, continued working on improving the engine. A vivid example of that is the development of the noise suppression system with noise-absorbing structures from polymer composite materials. There were in total more than 1500 D-30KU-154 engines manufactured by Rybinsk Engine Plant (now NPO UEC-Saturn).

D-30F-6

In the mid-1970s, the Soviet Union began the search for a high-speed interceptor to supplement and replace its MiG-25. The MiG-25 had two enormously powerful Tumansky R-15 turbojets, allowing Mach 3 speed at high altitudes, but the problem was their weak performance at low altitudes, not even sufficient to cross Mach 1 boundary. More acute problems stemmed from the tendency of the Foxbat's engines to break down at maximum throttle in high-speed situations. A new engine, this time a low-bypass turbofan, was needed to power the new interceptor. The Mikoyan-Gurevich (MiG) design bureau contracted OKB-19 design bureau (now part of Aviadvigatel) to build such an engine, for the aircraft that would become known as the MiG-31.

The Soloviev design bureau came up with the D-30F6 turbofan. Capable of generating 9,500 kgf (20,900 lbf or 93 kN) dry thrust and 15,500 kgf (34,200 lbf or 152 kN) afterburning thrust, the engine gave MiG's new interceptor a top speed exceeding 3,000 km/h (1,900 mph), and a maximum takeoff weight of 45,800 kg (101,000 lb). These powerful engines also allowed the large and complex interceptor to attain supersonic speeds at low altitudes under 1,500 m (4,900 ft). Data from: Aircraft engines of the World 1970, Jane's all the World's Aircraft 1993–94

Other Variants

D-30V12
High-altitude version for the Myasishchev M-55 de-rated to 49 kN (11,000 lbf)
D-30F11
Engine for experimental twin-engine S-37 (Su-47) prototype
D-21A1
Another variant of the two-spool engine with supersonic nozzle intended to power high-altitude supersonic business-jet S-21 from Sukhoi design bureau. Construction scheme is almost the same as for D-30F6 except for the absence of afterburner chamber.
WS-18
Chinese reverse engineered copy of imported D-30KP-2.

== Applications ==
- Bartini Beriev VVA-14 wing in ground effect aircraft
- Ilyushin Il-62 narrow body jet airliner
- Ilyushin Il-76 strategic airlifter
- Mikoyan MiG-31 jet interceptor
- Myasishchev M-55 high-altitude reconnaissance aircraft
- Sukhoi Su-47 Berkut (formerly S-37) demonstrator jet fighter
- Tupolev Tu-134 narrow body jet airliner
- Tupolev Tu-154 narrow body jet airliner
- Xi'an H-6 jet bomber (WS-18)
- Xi'an Y-20 strategic airlifter

== Specifications ==
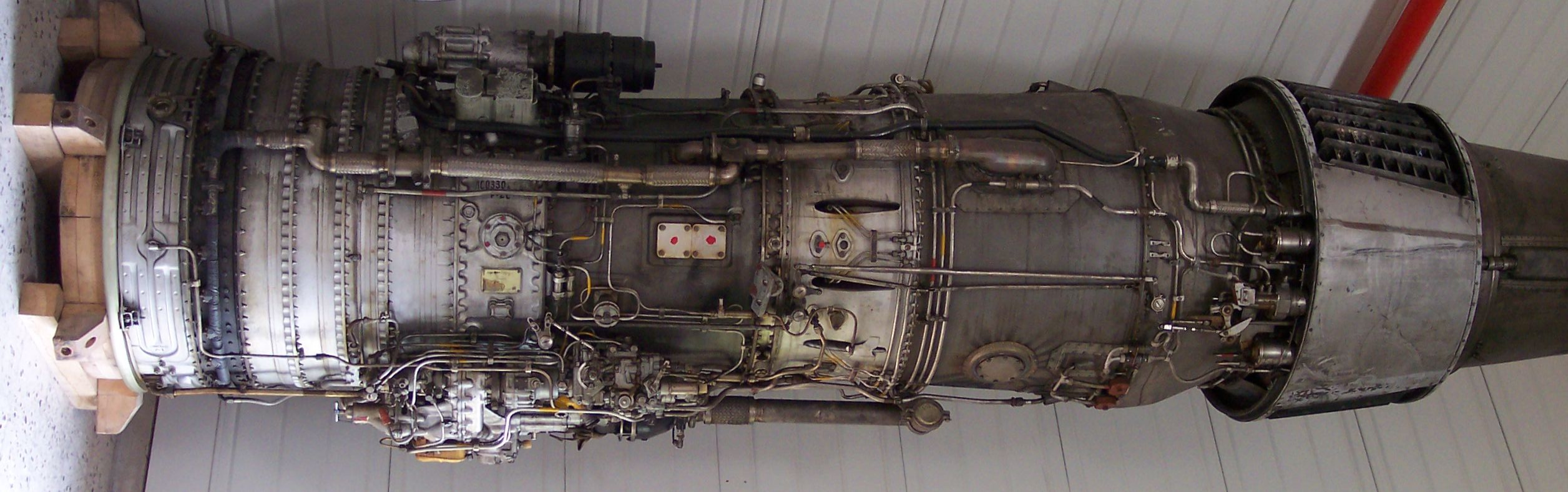
A Soloviev D-30 II

Model	D-30 II	D-30KU-154	D-30KP-2
Compressor	Axial fan, 4-stage LP compressor, 10-stage HP compressor	Axial fan, 3-stage LP compressor, 11-stage HP compressor	Axial fan, 3-stage LP compressor, 11-stage HP compressor
Combustor	Cannular with 12 flame tubes		
Turbine	2-stage HP turbine, 2-stage LP turbine	2-stage HP turbine, 4-stage LP turbine	2-stage HP turbine, 4-stage LP turbine
Thrust	66.68 kN (14,990 lb_{f})	103.02 kN (23,160 lb_{f})	117.68 kN (26,460 lb_{f})
Dry weight	1,546 kg (3,408 lb)	2,305 kg (5,082 lb)	2,640 kg (5,820 lb)(with reverser)
Thrust-to-weight ratio	4.45	4.56	5.21
Length	3,983 mm (156.8 in)	5,698 mm (224.3 in) (with reverser)	5,448 mm (214.5 in) (with reverser)
Specific fuel consumption (cruise) (kg/kgf-h)	0.781	0.705	0.715
Fan diameter	963 mm (38 in)	1,455 mm (57 in)	1,455 mm (57 in)
Bypass ratio	1:1	2.50:1	2.24:1
Overall pressure ratio	18.6	17.1	20.1
Turbine inlet temperature (K)	1360	1336	1427

== See also ==
Comparable engines

- Kuznetsov NK-8
- Pratt & Whitney JT3D
- Pratt & Whitney JT8D
- Rolls-Royce Spey

Related lists

- List of aircraft engines
