= Ethiopian Airlines Cargo Flight 3739 =

2020 aviation accident in China

- ET-ARH, the aircraft involved in the accident, pictured in 2019

Accident
- Date: 22 July 2020
- Summary: Ground fire caused by flammable material in the cargo hold
- Site: Shanghai Pudong International Airport, Shanghai, China; 31°09′23.7″N 121°47′44.2″E

Aircraft
- Aircraft type: Boeing 777-F60
- Operator: Ethiopian Airlines Cargo
- IATA flight No.: ET3739
- ICAO flight No.: ETH3739
- Call sign: ETHIOPIAN 3739
- Registration: ET-ARH
- Flight origin: Shanghai Pudong International Airport, China
- 1st stopover: Chongqing Jiangbei International Airport, China
- 2nd stopover: Addis Ababa Bole International Airport, Ethiopia
- Last stopover: São Paulo/Guarulhos International Airport, São Paulo, Brazil
- Destination: Santiago Arturo Merino Benítez International Airport, Chile
- Occupants: 5
- Crew: 5
- Fatalities: 0
- Injuries: 0
- Survivors: 5

On 22 July 2020, Ethiopian Airlines Cargo Flight 3739, a Boeing 777-F60 operating a scheduled international cargo flight from Shanghai Pudong International Airport, China, to Santiago Arturo Merino Benítez International Airport, Chile, with three stopovers in Chongqing Jiangbei International Airport, China, Addis Ababa Bole International Airport, Ethiopia, and São Paulo/Guarulhos International Airport, Brazil, caught fire on the ground, shortly before takeoff, at Shanghai Pudong International Airport. All five crew members on board survived, but the aircraft was destroyed. An investigation on the accident found that the fire was caused by flammable materials that spontaneously ignited in the cargo hold.

== Background ==
=== Aircraft ===
The aircraft involved in the accident was a Boeing 777-F60, a cargo version of the Boeing 777, registered as ET-ARH and manufactured in 2014.

=== Crew ===
On board the aircraft there were five crew members. The captain was a 42-year-old Ethiopian national, he had a total of 15000 flight hours, of which around 3000 were on the Boeing 777. The first officer was a 30-year-old Ethiopian national, he had a total of 2500 flight hours, of which 1000 on the 777, he also had a certification for flights transporting hazardous cargo. The second officer was a 62-year-old Ethiopian national, he had a total of 28500 flight hours, of which 5000 on the 777. The other two crew members on board were a 29-year-old maintenance technician and 29-year-old load master, both Ethiopian nationals.

== Accident ==
The aircraft was parked, at position 306 of the airport in Shanghai, and undergoing cargo unloading after a previous flight from Brussels Airport. At 1:35 pm local time, after all the previous cargo has been removed from the aircraft, a new cargo loading operation begun, preparing the aircraft for transporting 69370 kilograms of freight as Flight 3739. Around an hour later the five crew members boarded the aircraft and started to perform the pre-take off procedures. At 3:14 pm, soon after the aircraft closed all of its doors, a cargo hold fire alarm activated in the cockpit, so the crew requested to the airport ground control to send firefighting teams and vehicles to their position. Seven minutes later, the crew of Flight 3739 declared an emergency, as the aircraft was still on fire and firefighting crews were late to arrive. As the firefighters arrived both door 1L and the main cargo door of the aircraft were opened, letting the crew members evacuate and the fire engines to spray water inside the airplane. The fire was put definitely out at 6:14 pm. The fire severely damaged the upper parts of the aircraft's fuselage, creating holes and scorches on it; the most severely damaged part was the tail section, which was nearly completely destroyed. Despite the damage to the plane all five crew members on board successfully evacuated.

== Investigation ==
The Civil Aviation Administration of China began an investigation on the accident and released its final report on 7 January 2023. The investigation found out that the fire began in the cargo hold after some chlorine dioxide pills, destined to disinfection, spontaneously ignited. Temperature at Shanghai Pudong International Airport that day was over 34 °C; this, combined with the high humidity, made the pills, that were stored in pallets, made up by a total of 96 boxes, reach temperatures in excess of 80 °C, a temperature that for chlorine dioxide is sufficient to catch fire. The involvement of mishaps or of an aircraft failure in the development of the fire were excluded after the analysis of CCTV footage and the remains of the freight. It was also found that the shipping company that was sending these pills falsified some records to make them pass not pass as an hazardous material, giving it less restrictions regarding transport. Errors were also noted in how the airport handled the emergency, as noted in the delay of the arrival of the firefighting squads.

Recommendations were made about improving the methods of transport of chemical hazardous materials during cargo flights and the organization of emergency operations at Shanghai airport.

== Aftermath ==
The accident caused the closure of Shanghai Pudong International Airport for about an hour, leading to the cancellation of 16 flights and the delay of 34 others. In total 18 fire engines, coming from all over Shanghai, were dispatched for the emergency.

Ethiopian Airlines' group chief executive officer, Mesfin Tasew Bekele, released a statement in which he gave details about the accident, and that the airline was collaborating with Chinese authorities for the investigation.

In 2023, after the release of the final report, Ethiopian Airlines sued the Zhejiang Jietong Freight Forwarding shipping company, the owner of the chlorine dioxide pills, to a court in Hong Kong, to obtain a compensation for the hull loss of the aircraft.

== See also ==
- Aviastar-TU Flight 6534, another cargo flight that caught fire on the ground at Shanghai Airport
- Air Busan Flight 391, an Airbus A321 that caught fire on the ground during boarding
