= Tupolev Tu-204 =

Airliner by Tupolev

Tupolev Tu-204 / Tu-214
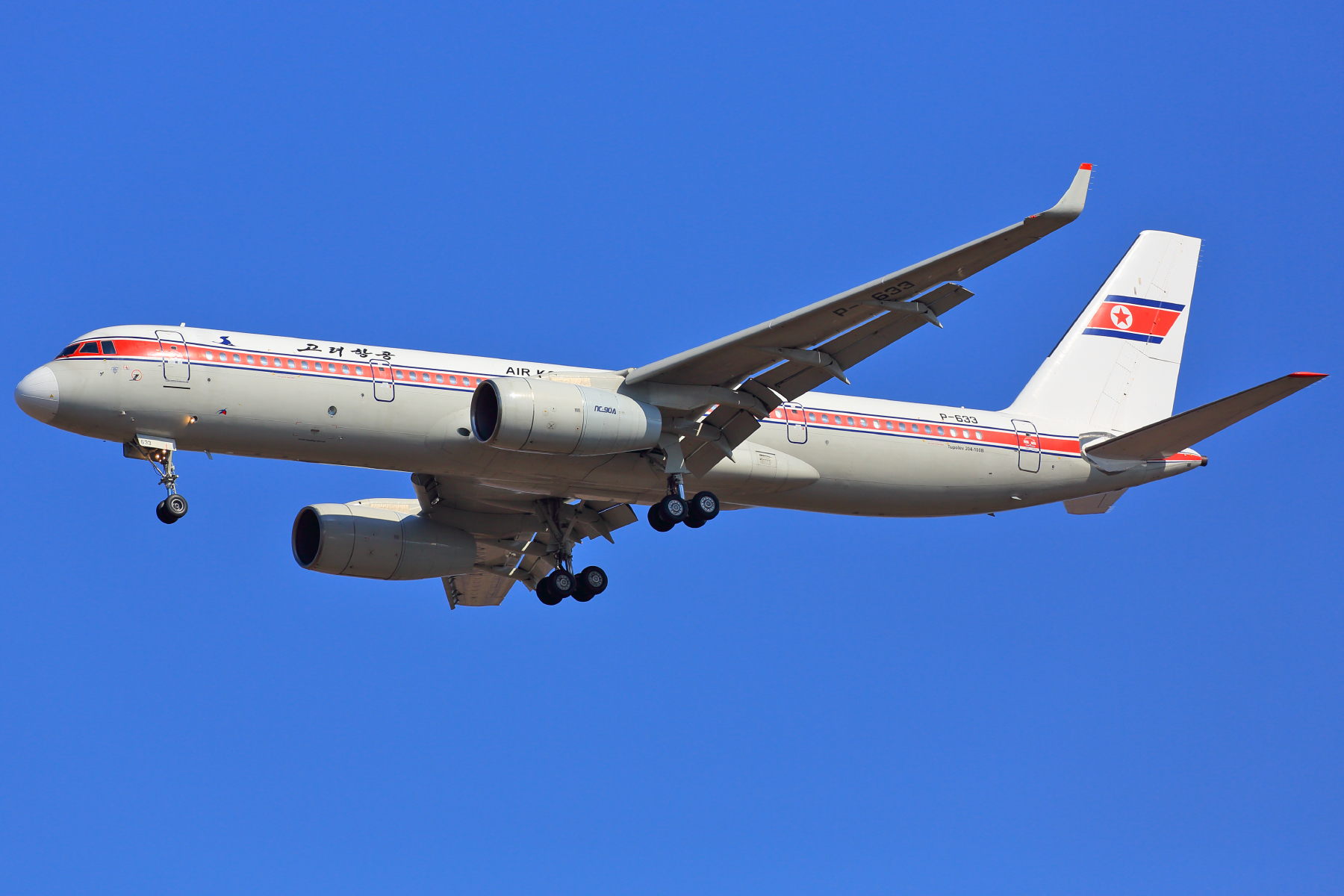
- An Air Koryo Tu-204-100 at Vladivostok Airport

General information
- Type: Narrow-body jet airliner
- National origin: Soviet Union/Russia
- Manufacturer: Tu-204: Aviastar SP; Tu-214: Kazan Aircraft Production Association
- Designer: Tupolev
- Status: In service, in production
- Primary users: Russian Air Force Red Wings Airlines; Cubana de Aviación; Air Koryo
- Number built: 89 as of December 2015

History
- Manufactured: 1990–present
- Introduction date: 23 February 1996 with Vnukovo Airlines
- First flight: 2 January 1989; 37 years ago
- Developed into: Tupolev Tu-334

The Tupolev Tu-204 (Russian: Туполев Ту-204) is a twin-engined medium-range narrow-body jet airliner capable of carrying 210 passengers, designed by Tupolev and produced by Aviastar-SP and Kazan Aircraft Production Association. First introduced in 1995, it was intended to be broadly equivalent to the Boeing 757, with slightly lower range and payload, and had competitive performance and fuel efficiency in its class.

It was developed for Aeroflot as a replacement for the medium-range Tupolev Tu-154 trijet in the 1990s. The latest version, with significant upgrades and improvements, is the Tu-204SM, which made its maiden flight on 29 December 2010. In April 2022, United Aircraft Corporation (UAC) announced plans to assemble 70 Tu-214s by 2030. However, in early 2024, Aeroflot expressed intention to transfer its order for fleets exclusively to next-generation MC-21 jets. The rejection of the Tupolev has various reasons, including no two-member cockpit, and also the evacuation ramps and about 13% of avionics (e.g. TCAS) still needing to be replaced by Russian equipment. The production plan remains, especially for designing new domestic aircraft parts.

== Design and development ==
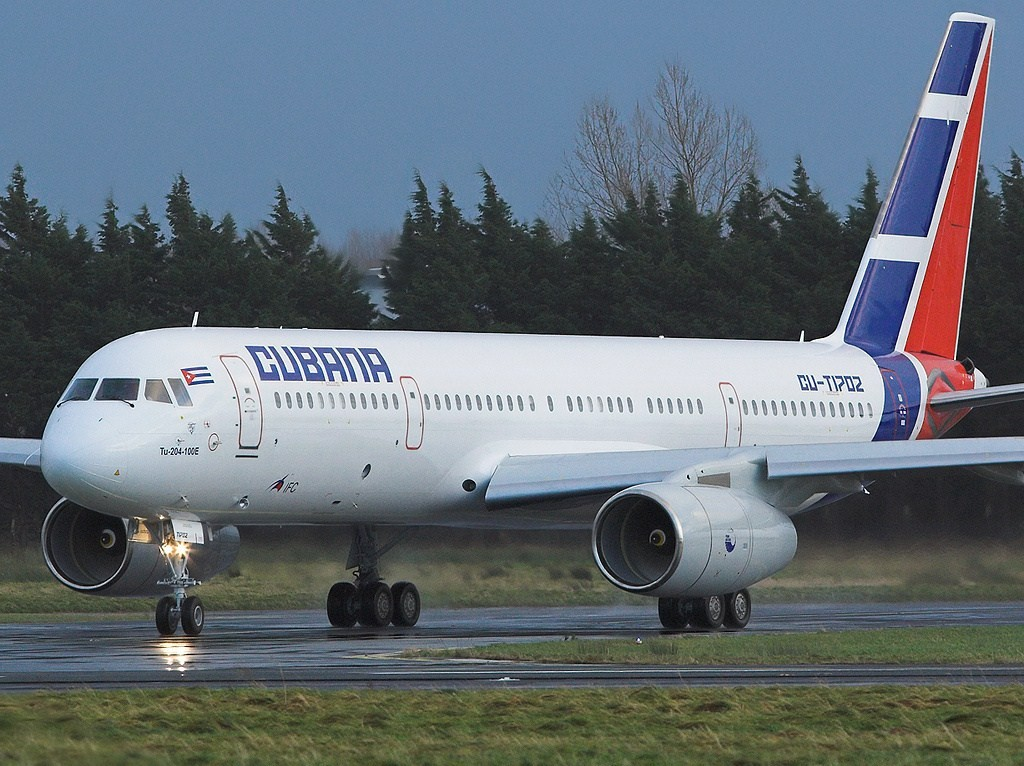
A Cubana Tupolev 204E in 2007

The Tu-204 was designed as a family of aircraft incorporating passenger, cargo, combi and quick-change variants. It is powered by either two Aviadvigatel PS-90 or Rolls-Royce RB211 engines. The Tu-204 is produced at two of the largest Russian aircraft manufacturing plants in Ulyanovsk (Tu-204 series) and Kazan (Tu-214).

The Tu-204 cabin was available in several layouts, including the baseline single-class layout seating for 210 passengers and a two- or three-class layout designed for 164–193 passengers. A cargo version of the Tu-204 is being successfully operated by several airlines in Europe and Egypt.

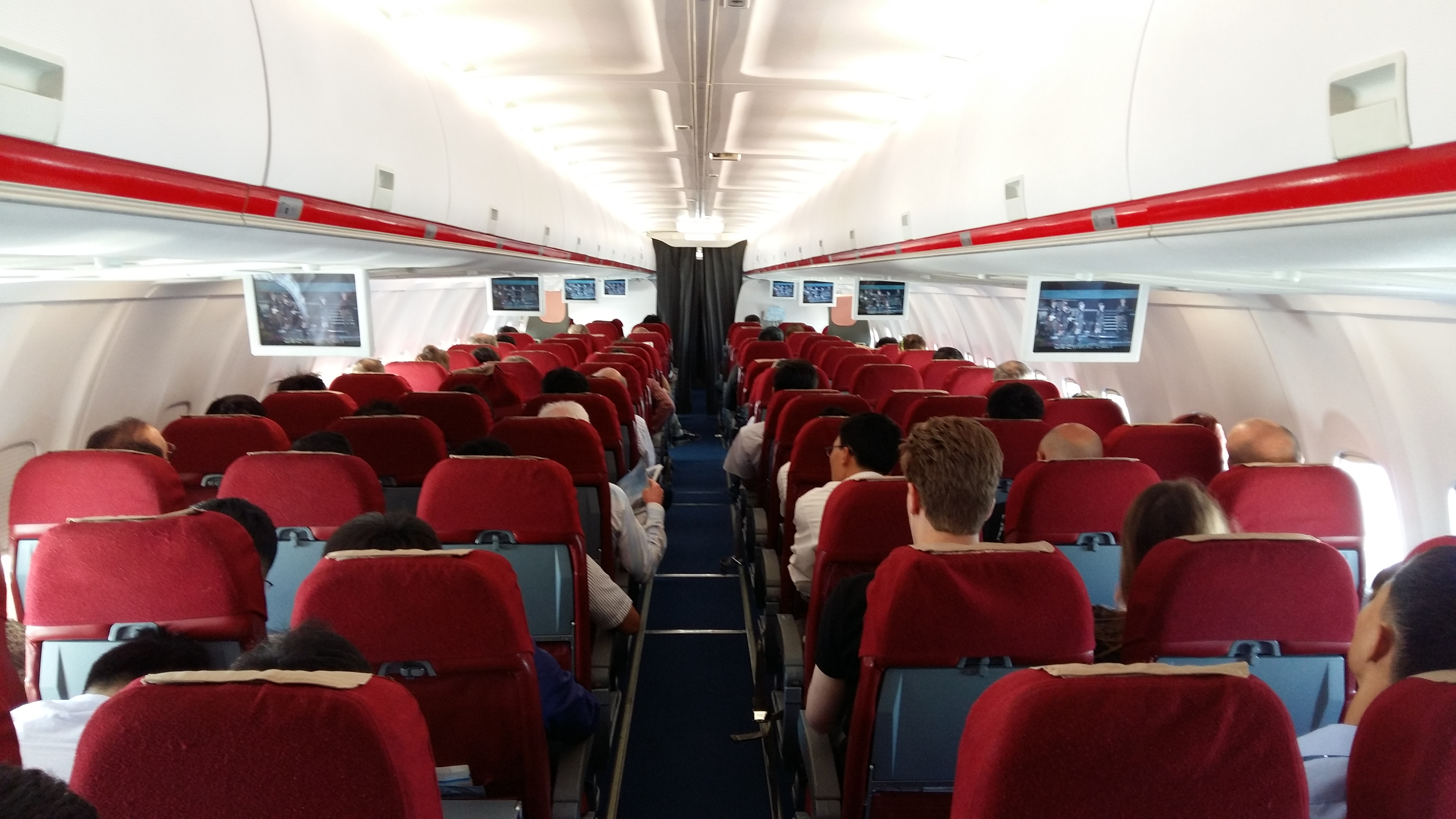
Cabin of a Tupolev Tu-204

Seating configuration is 3–3 in economy and 2–2 in Business class. The business class cabin has a seat pitch of 810 millimetres (31.9 in). The passenger cabin can be divided into compartments according to class with removable bulkheads and curtains. Compartments are illuminated by reflected light. Overhead bins for passenger baggage and coats are of the closed type. The volume of baggage per passenger is 0.052 cubic metres (1.8 cu ft).

In 1994, the first certificate for Tu-204 aircraft (with PS-90A engines) was issued. Subsequently, issued certificates have extended estimated operational conditions. The Tu-204-120 variant, certified with Rolls-Royce RB211-535E4 engines, complies with noise regulations described in Chapter 3 of Supplement 16 to ICAO, hence meeting all current European and ICAO requirements. The Tu-204-100 variant, certified with PS-90A engines, complies with noise regulations described in Chapter 4 of Supplement 16 to ICAO which means it is quieter. The aircraft was certified to Russian standards AP-25 (harmonized with FAR-25 and JAR-25).

=== Technology ===
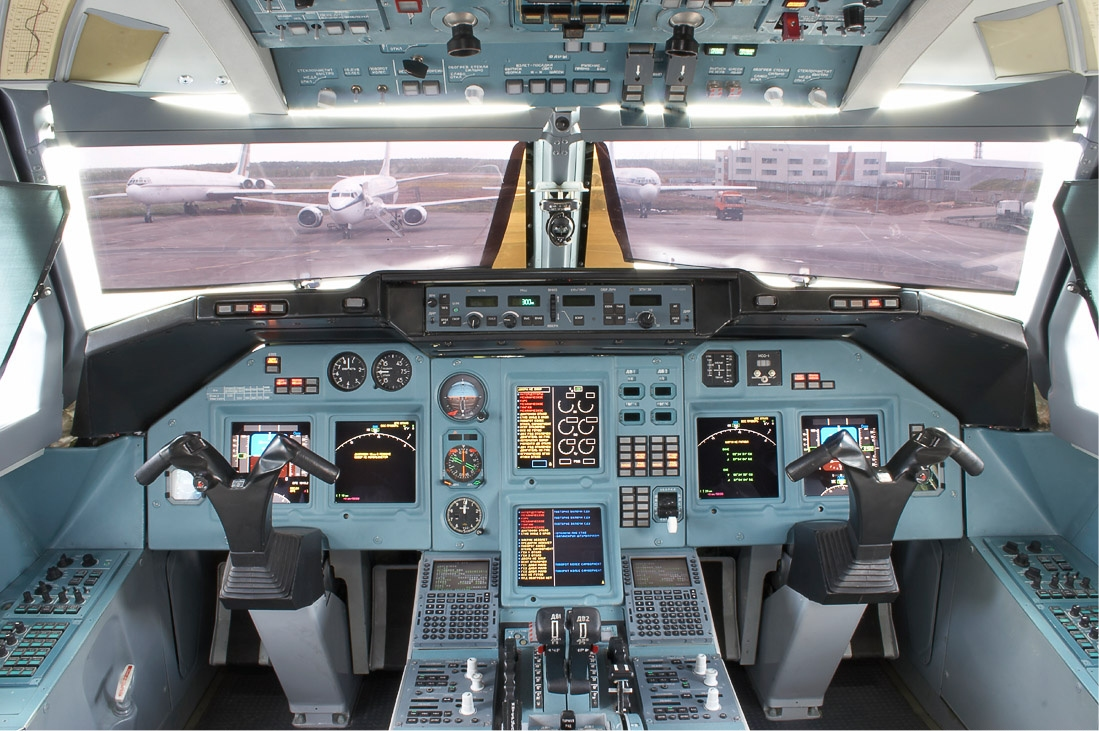
Cockpit of a Tu-214 (flight engineer station not shown)

The Tu-204 is part of the same generation of Russian aircraft as the Ilyushin Il-96. The Tu-204 features technologies such as fly-by-wire control systems, a glass cockpit, supercritical wings with winglets, and is available with Russian or foreign avionics. The wings and tails are relatively resistant to ice build-up, and as such anti-icing systems are not equipped. Among today's airliners the Tu-204 is the only one which does not require wing anti-icing systems. During the test flight safety has been confirmed without the anti-icing system on the bearing surfaces and the aircraft obtained Russian and European certificates.

In November 2024, testing of an updated Tu-214 with import substituted components began. A year later in December 2025, Rosaviatsiya approved the modifications to the Tu-214, which here focused on the replacement of foreign systems with domestic Russian ones. Changes included a new electronic flight instrument system, weather radar, ground proximity warning system and traffic collision avoidance system. By June 2026, deliveries of import-substituted aircraft had reportedly commenced.

== Tu-204 variants ==
=== Tu-204/204C ===
The Tu-204 is the basic passenger airline model, and the Tu-204C is the basic freight or cargo model. The most-used models are the -100C and the -120C.

=== Tu-204-100/200 ===
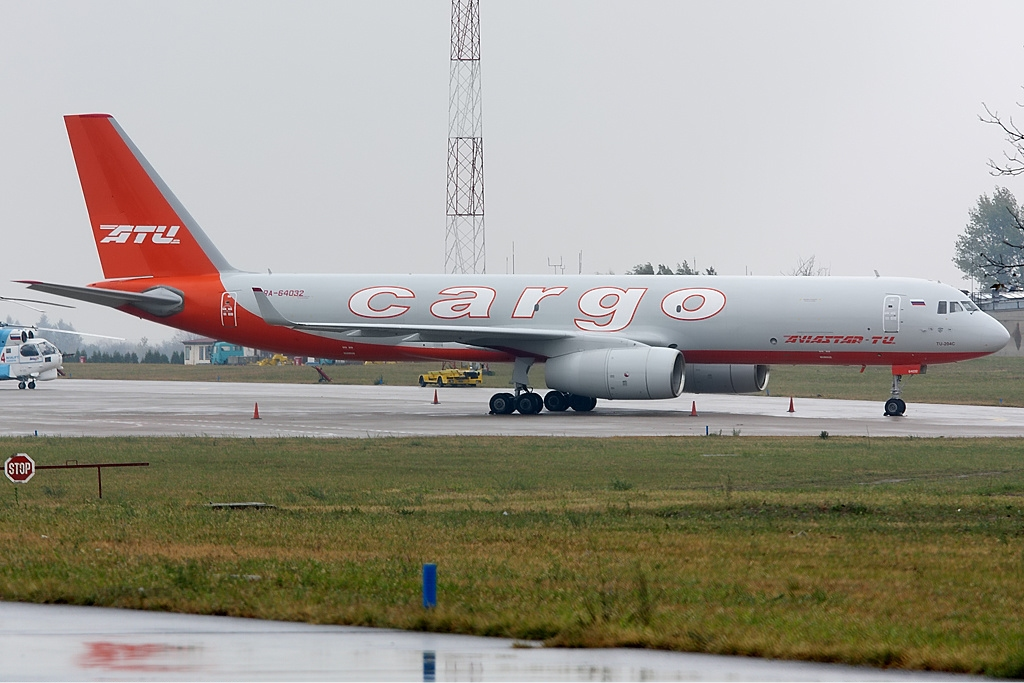
Aviastar-TU Tupolev Tu-204-100C cargo aircraft (registration RA-64032) at an airport.

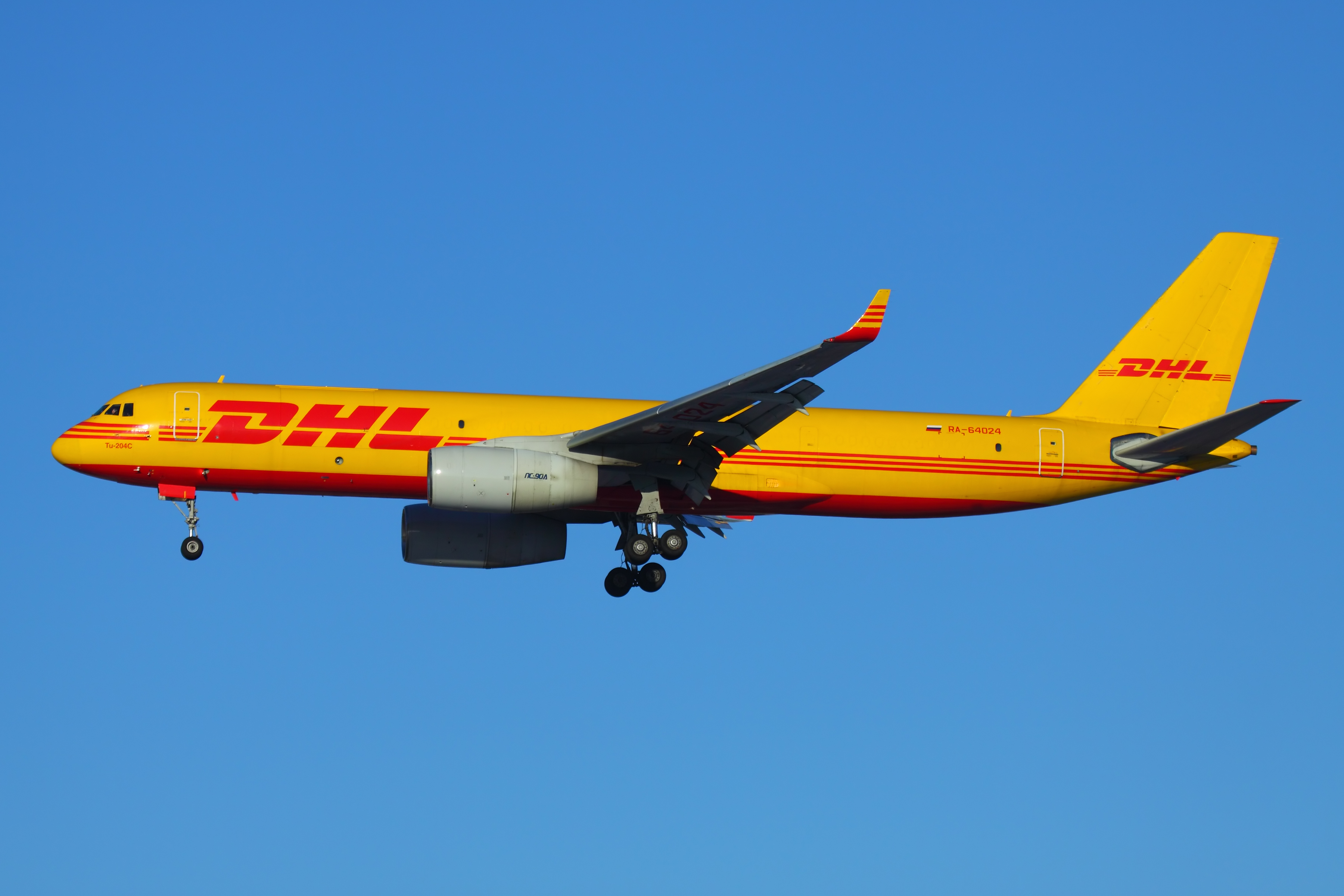
A Tupolev Tu-204C cargo operated for DHL by Aviastar-TU at Sheremetyevo International Airport in Moscow, Russia

Certified in January 1995, this initial version is powered by Soloviev (now Aviadvigatel) PS90 turbofans with 157 kN (35,300 lbf) of thrust, and uses Russian avionics in addition to its Russian engines. The Tu-204-200 is a heavier version with extra fuel for more range. Only one was built by Aviastar-SP in Ulyanovsk but has not yet been delivered (RA-64036). Now this version is only produced by KAPO in Kazan, marketed under the designation Tu-214. The Tu-204-100C and Tu-204-200C are cargo versions of the −100 and −200 respectively, fitted with a forward main deck freight door. Currently, the Tu-204-100/200 is offered with the option of an up-rated Aviadvigatel PS90A2 turbofan, which promises 40% more service between overhauls.

The Tu-204-100's maximum take-off weight (MTOW) is 103 tonnes, and its range with max payload is 4,400 kilometres (2,700 mi).

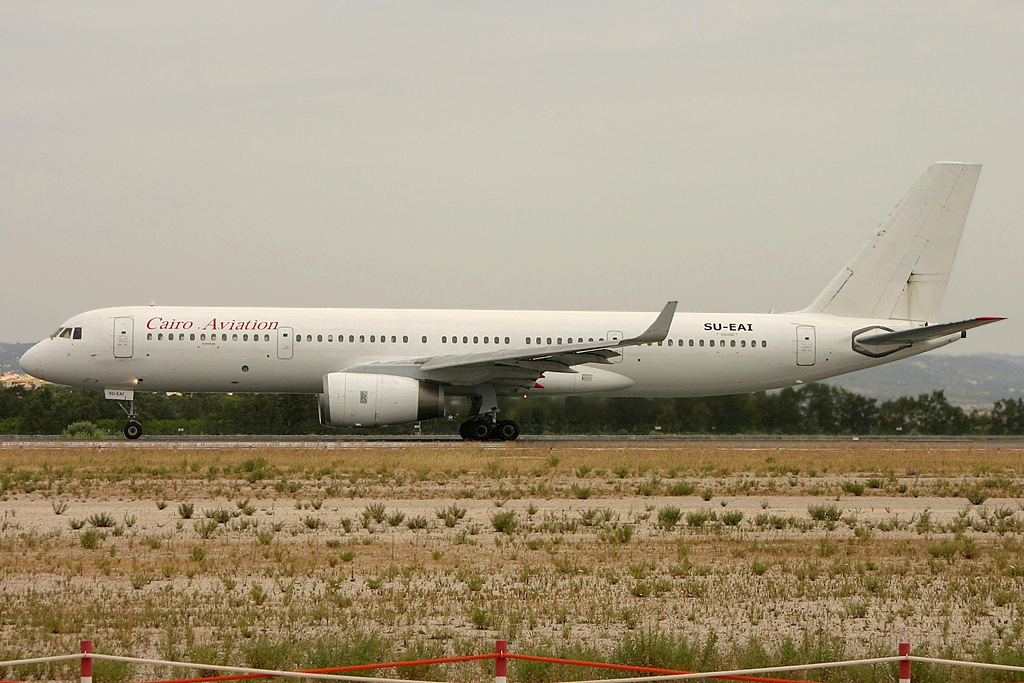
A Rolls-Royce-powered Tu-204-120 of Cairo Aviation

=== Tu-204-120/220/120C/220C ===
To broaden product appeal, the Tu-204-120/220 offers non-Russian avionics and engines. It is powered by two Rolls-Royce RB211-535 engines, each with thrust of 192 kN (43,100 lbf). Egypt's Cairo Aviation became the debut operator in November 1998 when it took delivery of a Tu-204-120 and its cargo version the Tu-204-120C. The Tu-204-220 and Tu-204-220C cargo version, are a higher gross weight variants of the basic Tu-204-120.

The Tu-204-120 has a maximum takeoff weight of 103 tonnes and a range with max payload of 4,500 kilometres (2,800 mi).

=== Tu-204-300 ===
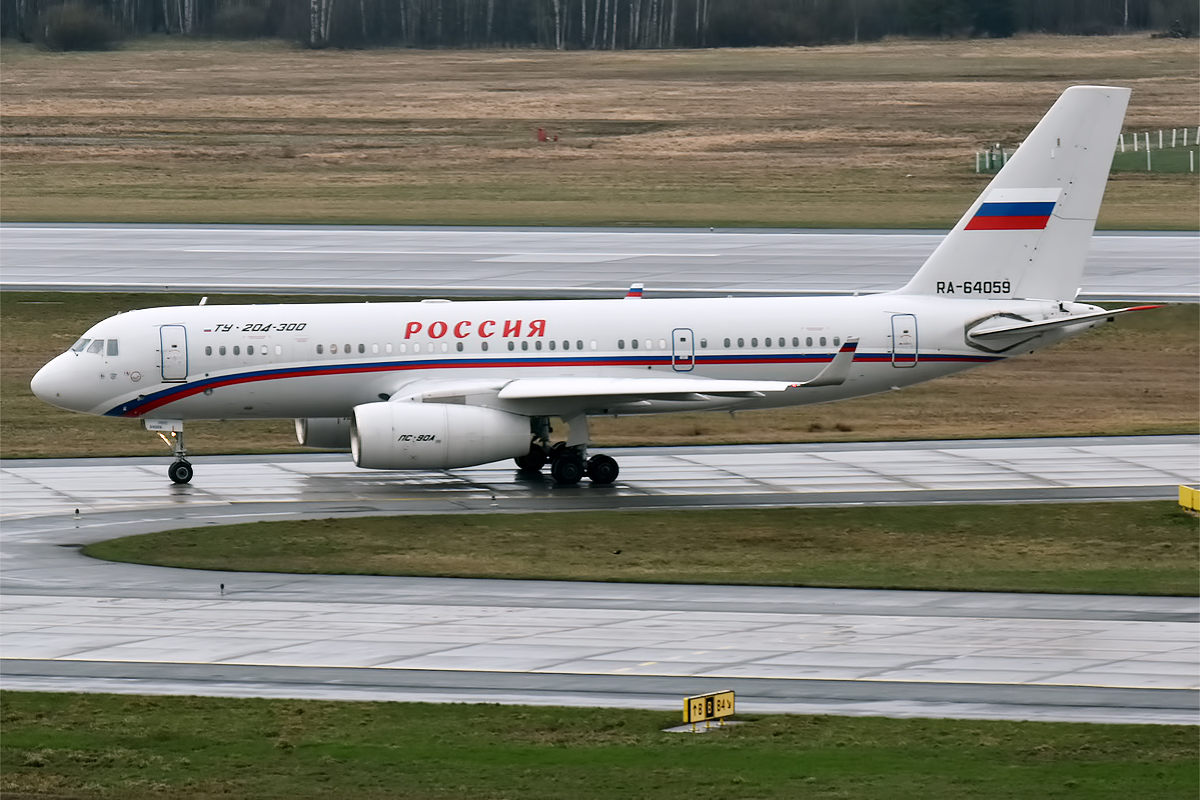
A Rossiya Special Flight Unit's Tu-204-300

A shortened, longer-range and more efficient derivative of the Tu-204, the Tu-204-300 is also known as Tu-234. About six meters (20 ft) shorter than the basic Tu-204, this variant is available in two versions: the longer-ranged, heavier version, powered by Aviadvigatel PS-90A2 turbofans, has a maximum take-off weight of 107.5 metric tons and range (with 166 passengers) increased to 9,300 kilometres (5,000 nmi); and the lighter, shorter-ranged version, with a maximum take-off weight of 89 metric tons and range of 3,500 kilometres (1,900 nmi) with 166 passengers. The former Russian airline Vladivostok Air was the debut customer. This airline's aircraft are in a two-class seating configuration, with a 142-passenger capacity. Average numbers of flight hours during each 24-hour period is 9.35 hours, for year 2009. It is also operated by Air Koryo which currently operates one Tu-204-100B and one Tu-204-300. The Тu-204s operate on the Pyongyang-Beijing, Vladivostok, and Shenyang routes.

=== Tu-204-500 ===
This is a version of the Tu-204-300 optimized for shorter routes, featuring smaller wings and an increased cruising speed (to Mach 0.84), which makes it a competitor to the Next Generation Boeing 737. It is ETOPS rated, and fitted with a Honeywell 331-200ER APU.

=== Tu-206 ===
The planned experimental Tupolev Tu-206

The Tu-206 is a company-funded concept aircraft that, if built, would be used as a testbed for alternative fuels, specifically liquefied natural gas.

=== Tu-204SM ===
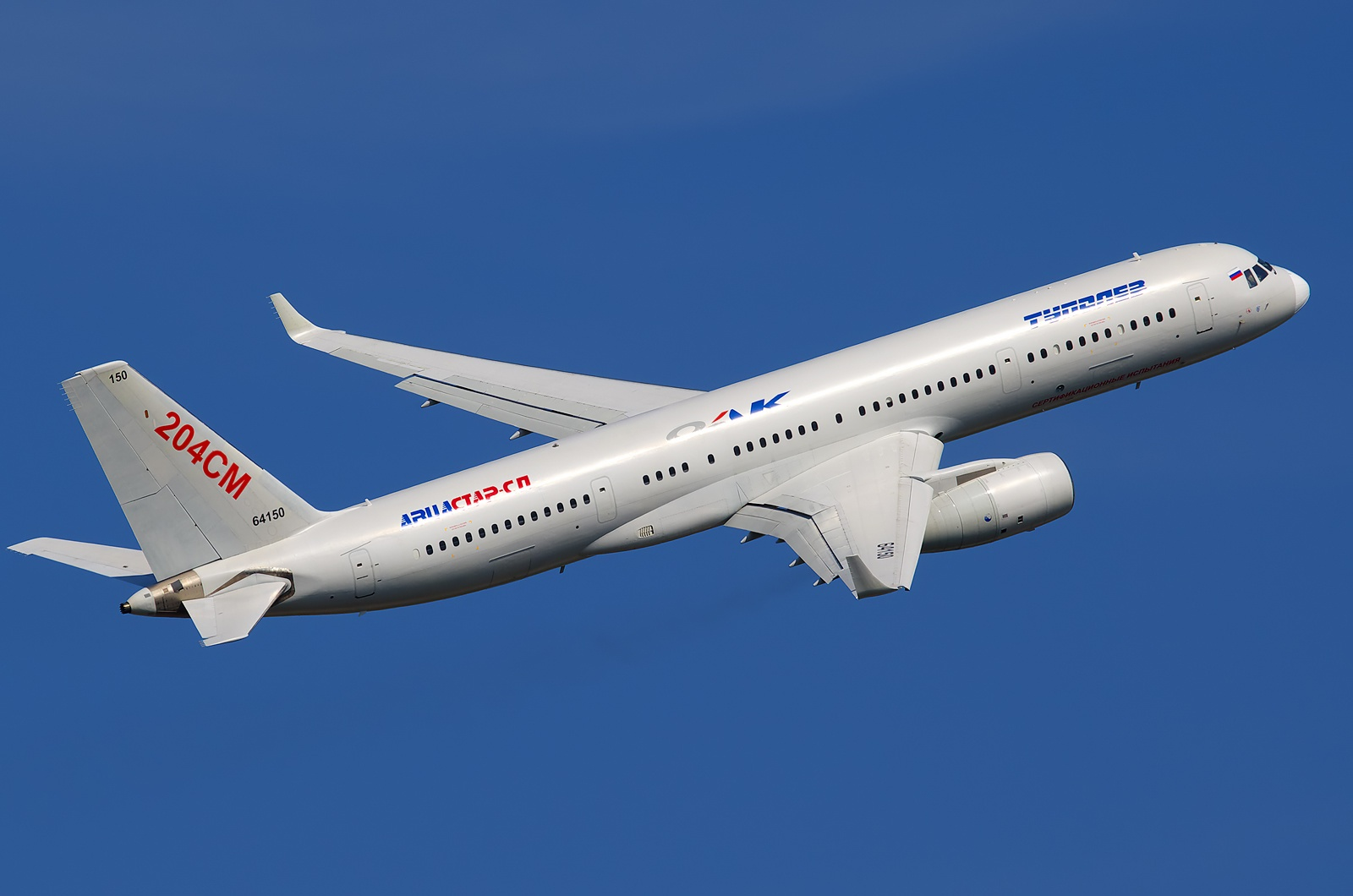
Tupolev Tu-204SM

The Tu-204SM, alternatively Tu-204CM, a medium-range airliner, is an upgraded version of the Tu-204-100/300. While the Tu-204SM will retain key design and aerodynamic features of the Tu-204-100/100E/100V series, there are numerous upgrades, largely aimed at meeting the current and near-future Russian and international standards, including those of ICAO and Eurocontrol.

The new cockpit features allow the Tu-204SM to be flown by a two-pilot crew (as compared with the three-pilot arrangement of the original Tu-204 series). These features include a new computer (VSUPT-85-2040), a new flight management system (ASO-204/FMS), wide LCD displays (KSEIS-204E), head-up displays (HUD), and an automated board system maintenance and diagnostic system. The electronic flight bag concept will be implemented and all controls and displays will be in English.

The Tu-204SM will be powered by two PS-90A2 engines. The latter is significantly improved over the original PS-90A power plants. and features a unified twin-spool turbofan with a high bypass ratio. The PS-90A2 is expected a life cycle cost saving of 35% over the original engine with a simultaneous increase in reliability in the 50 to 100% range. The PS-90A2 is designed to meet the Russian AP-33 aviation standard, which is harmonized with the US FAR Part 33 and the European JAR33.

There will also be a new APU (TA-18 APU-200) and upgraded fuel management, hydraulic and fire safety systems.

The updated passenger cabin accommodates a maximum of 210 passengers or 174 in a typical two-class layout. The upgrades include new larger storage bins, multicolored LED lighting, sound-absorbing structures and a modern in-flight entertainment system (IFE).

The price for one Tu-204SM is estimated at USD 40–47 million.

The first test flight of Tu-204SM was successfully carried out on 29 December 2010. First deliveries of Tu-204SM were originally planned for 2011. As of December 2019, no Tu-204SM aircraft have been delivered and the project likely will never see fruition.

==== Tu-204SM orders ====
Red Wings Airlines was the first airline to order the Tu-204SM. Ilyushin Finance Co. (IFC) said it would complete negotiations with Red Wings for 44 Tu-204SM aircraft in February, to sign a firm order in March 2011. Red Wings already operates a fleet of Tu-204-100 and Tu-204-100V jetliners, to which it added one airframe in 2010. Russia's largest aircraft lessor, Ilyushin Finance, has previously placed Tu-204-100 aircraft with Cubana, Air Koryo and Red Wings, and Tu-204-300s with Vladivostok Avia and Air Koryo. Faced with low production rates for the Tu-204 models, Tupolev asked component providers to lower their prices in order to cut the plane's overall price by 27–30%. These suppliers agreed, on condition that 44 more firm orders be secured for the Tu-204SM through 2016.

By January 2012 a firm order from Red Wings had not been signed, the stumbling blocks being requests for guarantees of the residual value of the airframes and after-sales support at a cost the same as an equivalent Airbus or Boeing model. It was subsequently announced that Red Wings had cut back its initial commitment from 44 to 15 Tu-204SMs due to delays to the flight-test programme and after the lessor Ilyushin Finance reportedly "lost interest".

A large order by Iran Air Tours came under threat because of sanctions against the Iranian economy, as the American company Pratt & Whitney has been involved in the development of the engine with the Perm Engine Company. Completing the sale by re-equipping the Tu-204SMs with the Tu-204's Russian-made PS-90A engines was later proposed. Ultimately, however, this deal did not materialize.

At the Singapore Air Show in 2016 the Vice President of the Russian United Aircraft Corporation stated that every company that has ordered the Tu-204 has gone bankrupt so there were no outstanding orders for the Tu-204SM, and Tupolev has frozen development work on the aircraft and UAC would withdraw it from their list of aircraft prices as soon as the Irkut MC-21 comes to the market.

== Tu-214 variants ==
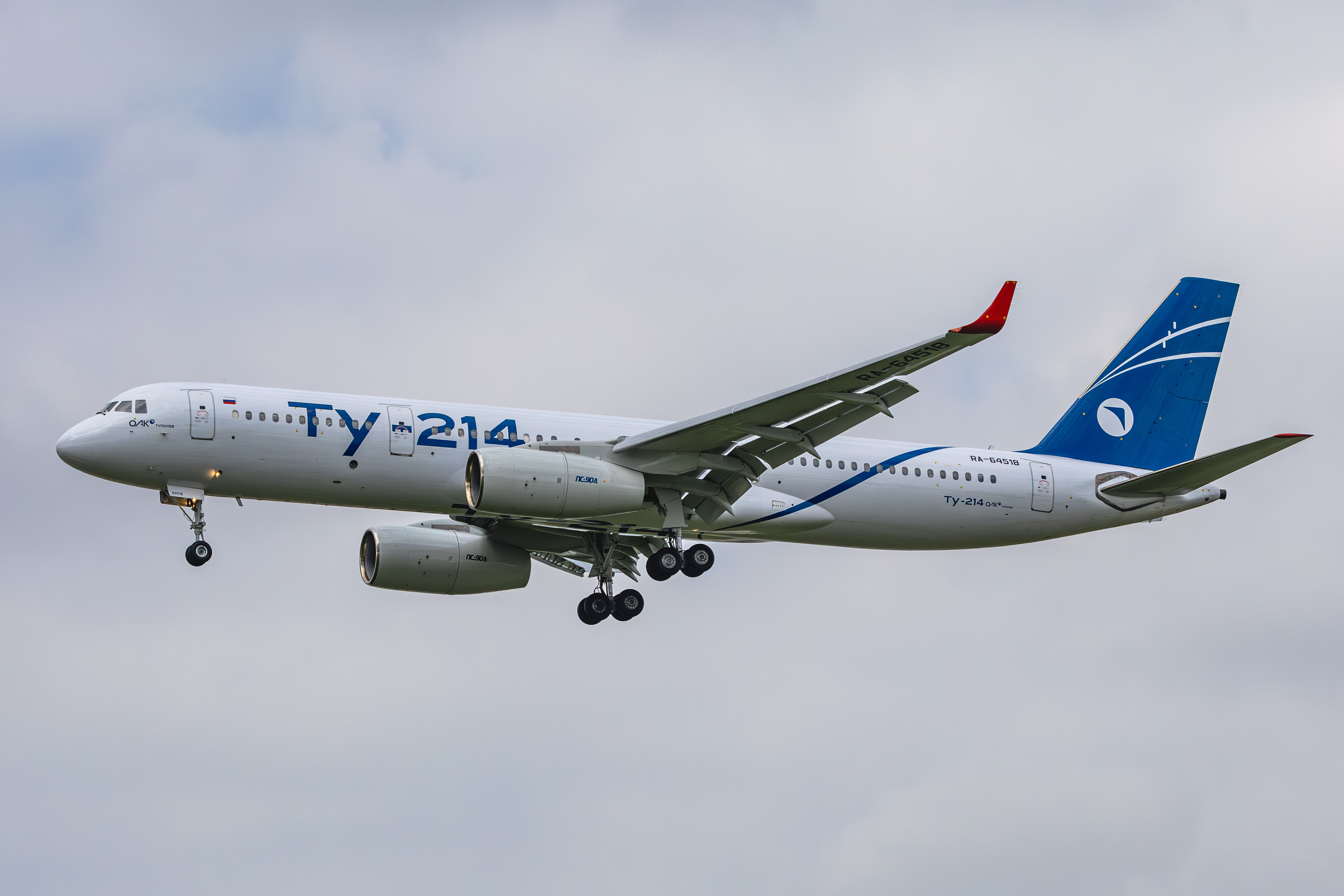
A Tu-214 in United Aircraft Corporation livery

=== Tu-214 ===
The Tu-214 is also a variation of the Tu-204 first flown on 21 March 1996. It is technically a Tu-204-200, one of the differences being that it is built by a different factory. Planes designated Tu-204 are produced in Ulyanovsk by Aviastar-SP; Tu-214 in Kazan by the Kazan Aircraft Production Association (KAPO). Both factories are independent from the Tupolev design bureau and have some control over the design of the variant they produce.

The main difference is a full-size main door at the left side of the fuselage just before the wing. The Tu-204 has two main doors and two emergency doors; the Tu-214 has three doors and one emergency door.

The Tu-214 is essentially a higher gross weight variant of the Tu-204, being fitted with extra fuel tanks and structural adjustments to deal with the heavier gross weight. For this reason, the Russian government prefers to use it as the platform upon which all further modifications for the 'Special Mission' variants will be based. Some of the special mission variants are claimed to be capable of a non-stop 10,000-kilometre flight range.

As of July 2018, a total of three Tupolev Tu-214 aircraft were in airline service with Rossiya.

In March 2022, CEO of Rostec Sergey Chemezov declared a possibility to relaunch big production of Tu-214 due to International sanctions during the Russo-Ukrainian War. On 6 April 2022, Yuri Slusar announced the United Aircraft Corporation (UAC) had already started production of 20 Tu-214s to replace Russia's fleet of Boeing and Airbus passenger aircraft.

On 16 August 2022, United Aircraft Corporation announced plans to increase Tupolev Tu-214 production to at least 10 to 12 aircraft per year, with the aim to produce 70 Tupolev Tu-214 by 2030. It was said the first Tu-214 for commercial flights expected to appear in 2024, then delayed to 2025, but later that year in November, a 100% Russian-made prototype had its maiden flight as a testbed. The changes were certified by Rosaviatsiya in December 2025.

==== Tu-214ON ====
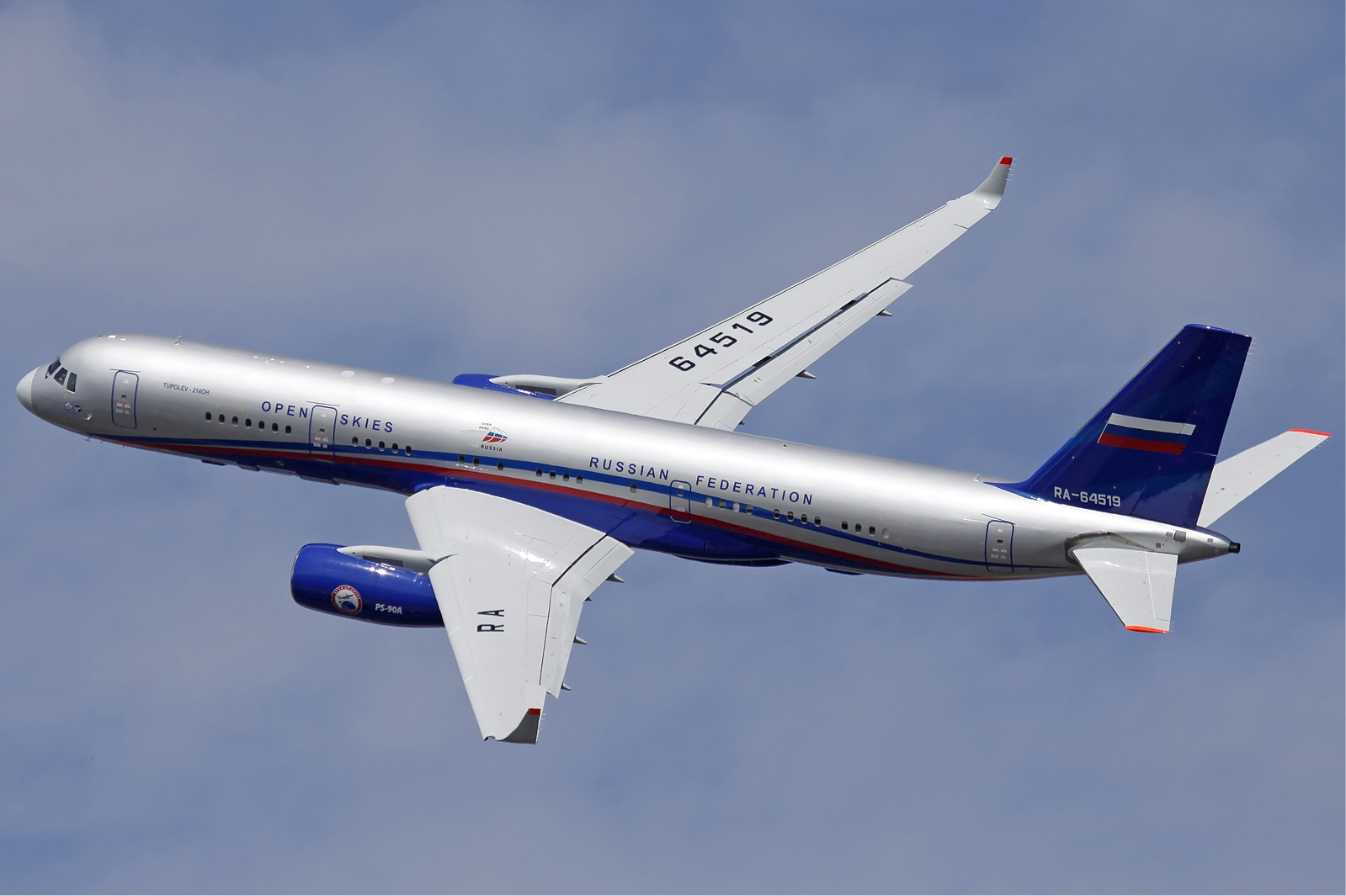
Russian Air Force Tu-214ON in flight

The Tu-214ON is an observation version of the Tu-204-200, equipped for Treaty on Open Skies missions and built by Kazan Aircraft Production Association. Vega Radio Engineering Corporation was contracted for the development of airborne surveillance system, ground-based complex and other mission equipment for the aircraft. It is equipped with one A-84ON panoramic camera, one AK-111 topographic camera and two perspective AK-112 digital aerial cameras to capture high-resolution aerial photography. Two video cameras, a Raduga infrared thermographic camera and Ronsard side looking airborne radar (SLAR) are also fitted.

The first Tu-214ON (RA-64519) was demonstrated at the MAKS-2011 international air show in Moscow. It performed its first test flight on 1 June 2011, which was followed by a series of 24 flights by December 2011. The Ministry of Defence of the Russian Federation conducted state tests to verify the air and ground equipment of the Tu-214ON aircraft in April 2013. The jet was delivered to the Russian Defence Ministry on 22 August 2013. The second airliner (RA-64525) made its first flight on 18 December 2013 and was delivered on 4 July 2014. The Tu-214ON is set to replace the Tupolev Tu-154 and Antonov An-30 aircraft in the role.

After Russia withdrew from the Treaty on Open Skies in 2021 in response to the United States's earlier withdrawal in 2020, the two Tu-214ON used for treaty observation missions have been used for military observation flights in Crimea.

==== Tu-214PU ====
Airborne command post version. Six operated for the Russian President.

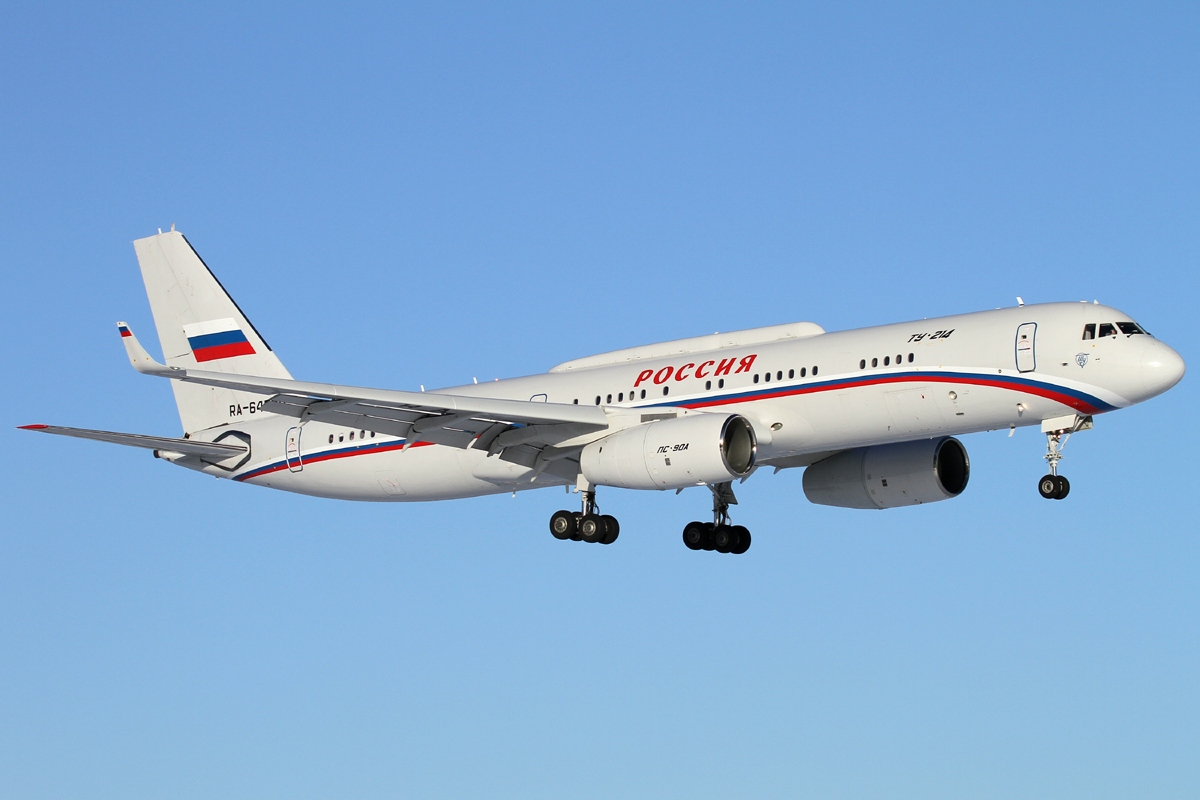
A Tu-214PU in Rossiya Special Flight Unit livery.

==== Tu-214SR ====
Communications relay version. Five operated by Special Flight Unit Rossiya for the Russian government.

==== Tu-214SUS ====
Communications relay version for the Russian President. Two delivered.

==== Tu-214R ====
Special-mission versions of the Tu-214 commercial transport aircraft, developed under the codename 'Project 141', to replace the Il-20 ELINT platform. The aircraft are configured to carry the MRC-411 multi-intelligence payload, to include electronic intelligence (ELINT) sensors, side-looking Synthetic Aperture Radar (SAR) and other Signals Intelligence (SIGINT). In addition, the aircraft will carry multi-spectral electro-optical systems. The aircraft has conducted test flights over the Sea of Japan but the programme experienced problems in January 2013. (Jane's Defence Weekly 16 January 2013)

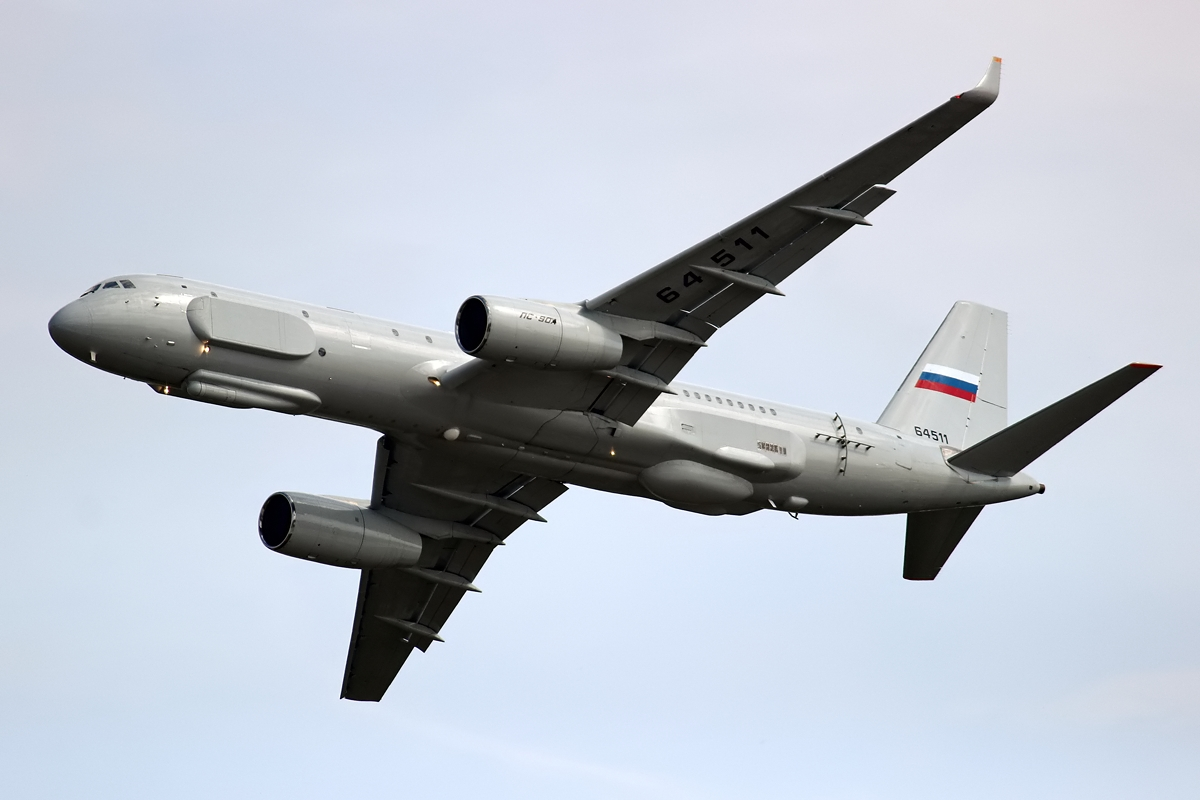
Tu-214R in flight from Borisoglebskoye airfield (2014)

The Tu-214R made its public debut in August 2013 at Moscow Air Show MAKS and was heralded as a platform for conducting surveillance of the U.S., in accordance with the Treaty on Open Skies, to monitor compliance with the relevant treaties.

As of January 2015, two were conducting test flights with the Russian Air Force.

In February 2016, Russia was reported to have deployed one Tu-214R to its base in Latakia, Syria.

In July 2016, two flights have been reported to have been conducted near the Latvian, Estonian and Finnish borders, with the plane (registry reported as RA-64514) conducting close approaches a few dozen kilometers of the Finnish border on 5 and 7 July.

After Syria operation, the aircraft was declared combat-ready. One plane was reportedly used against Ukraine in 2022.

==== Tu-214PU-SBUS ====
Special-purpose aircraft-control point equipped with a special onboard communication unit SBUS-214 intended for the Ministry of Defence of Russia. The aircraft is built with Russian-made components only, meeting the requirements of the state customers, and has a range of at least 7,200 km (4,500 mi). The main purpose of the aircraft is to provide additional communication capabilities to the user. The Russian MoD placed an order for two aircraft in November 2015. The first aircraft was delivered in March 2018, the second in June the same year.

==== Tu-214LMK ====
A flying laboratory based on a serial Tu-214 passenger plane (registration number RA-64507) equipped with a multifunctional flight complex LMK-214. The aircraft is intended for in-flight testing of a new radar complex and other on-board aviation equipment for the modernized Tupolev Tu-160M2 and the future Tupolev PAK DA strategic bombers. It began flight testing on 29 December 2018.

== Operators ==
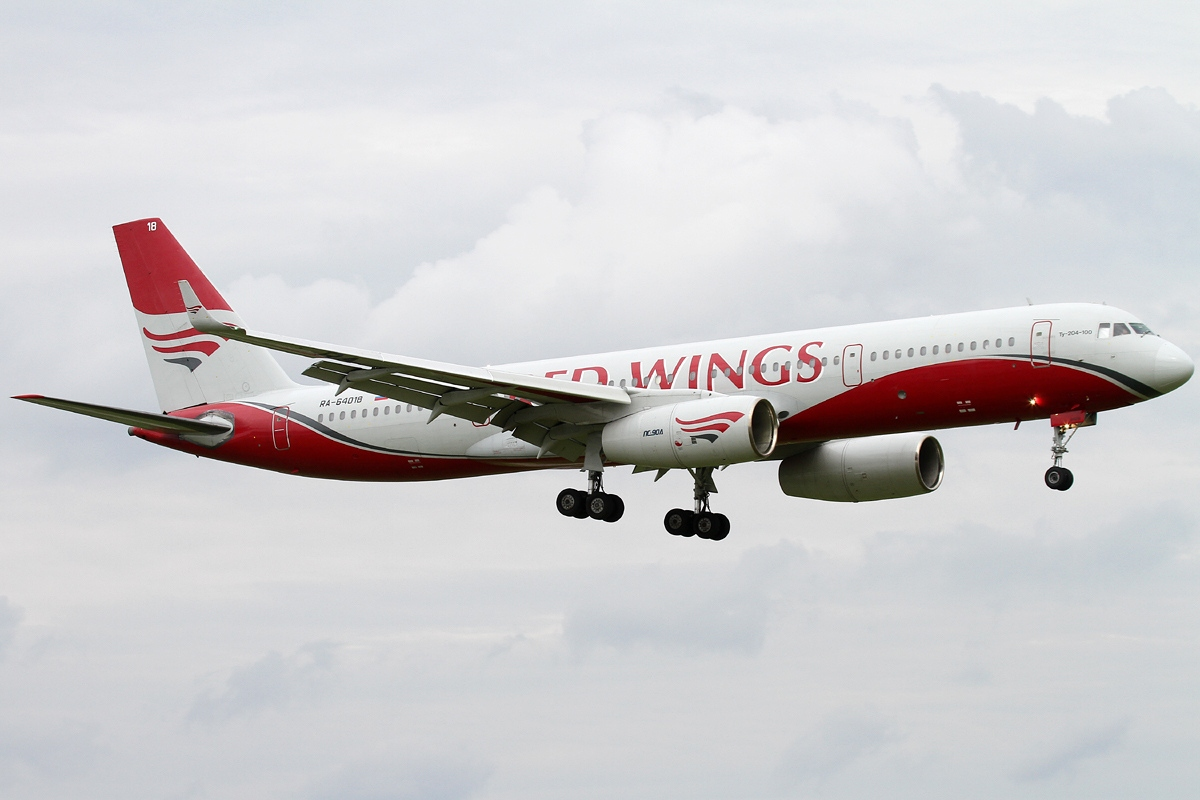
Red Wings Tupolev Tu-204

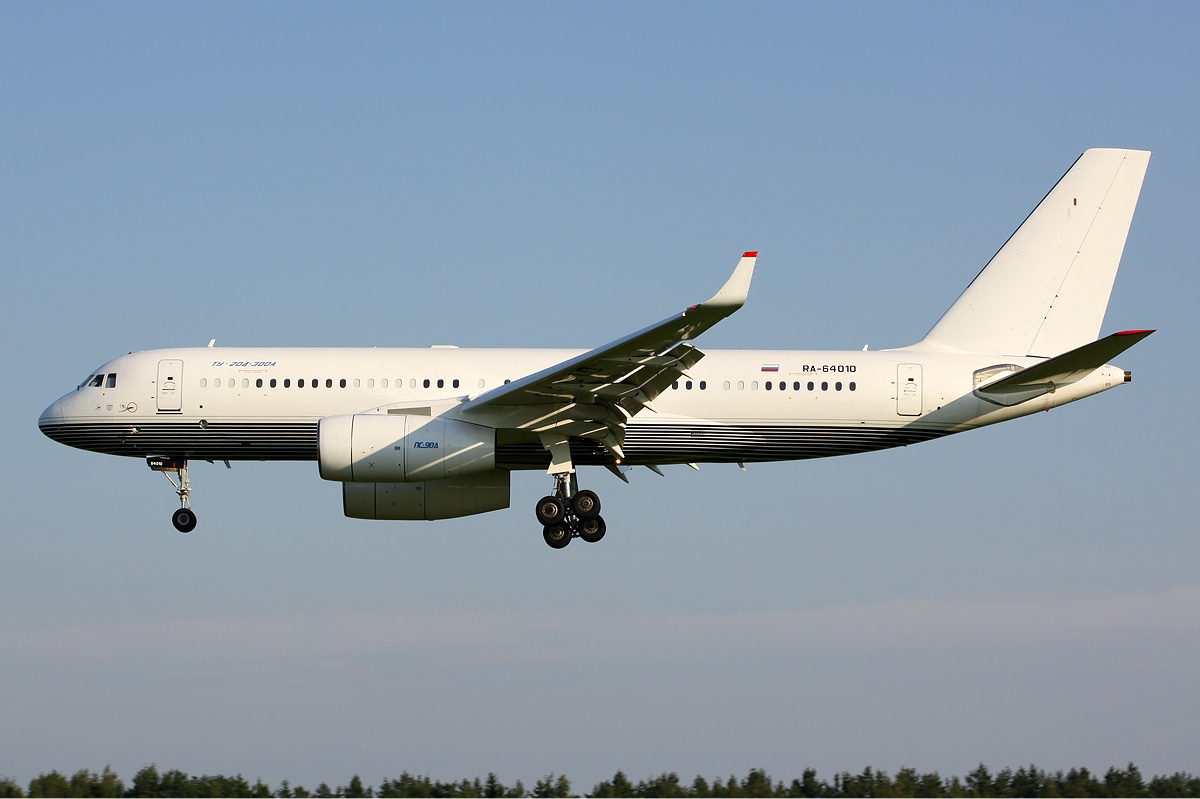
This Tu-204-300A is the first Tu-204 to be converted into a VIP configuration. Business Aero operates this aircraft for VTB.

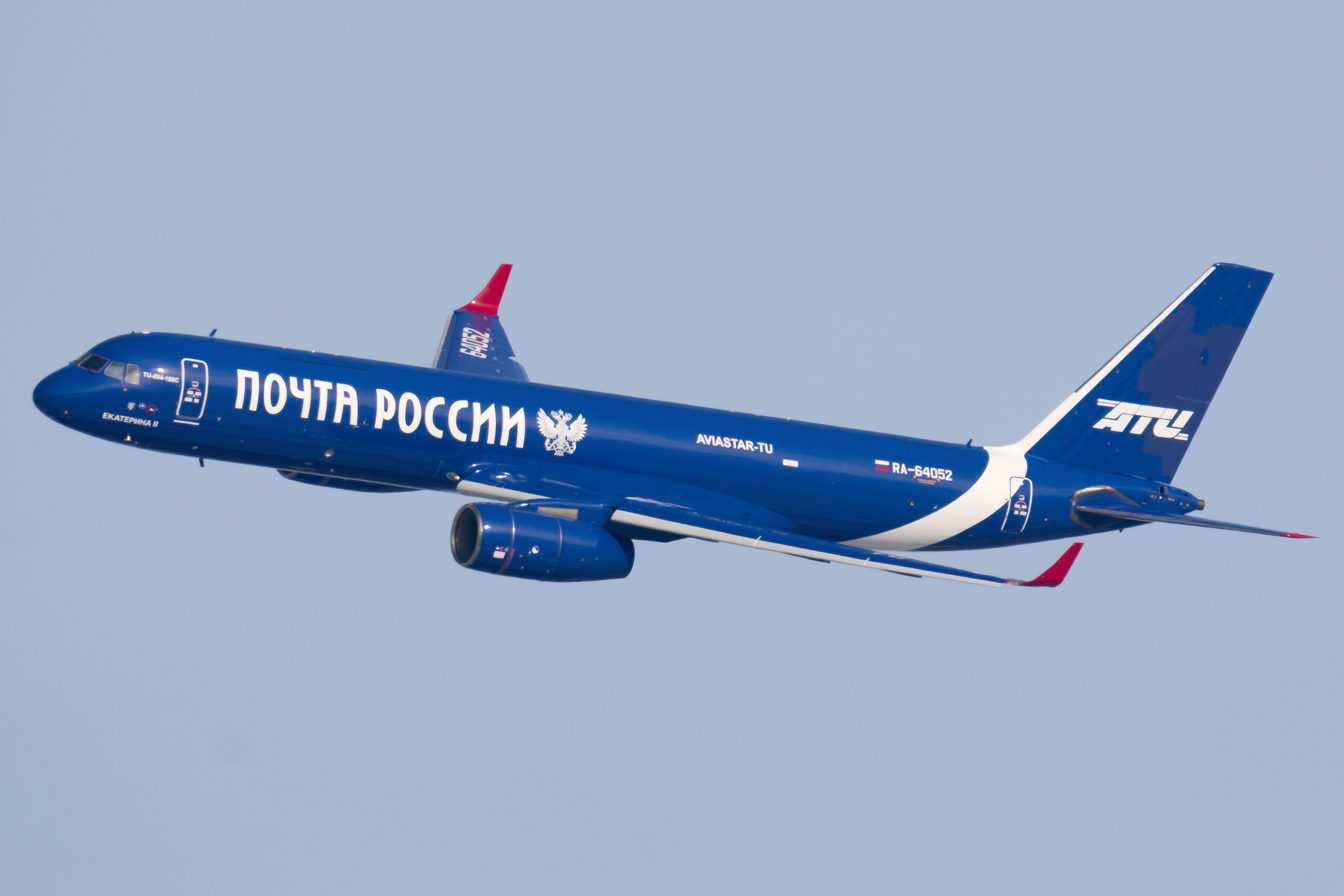
A Russian Post Tu-204-100C operated by Aviastar-TU

As of September 2026, there are 14 aircraft in commercial service. Total users as of August 2024 include:

Airline	Aircraft type	In service	On order	Stored
(North Korea) Air Koryo	Tu-204-100	1	–	–
(North Korea) Air Koryo	Tu-204-300	1	–	–
(Russia) Aviastar-TU	Tu-204-100C	1	–	1
(Russia) Aviastar-TU Co. Ltd	Tu-204	4	2	4
(Russia) Business Aero (for VTB)	Tu-204-300A	1	–	–
(Cuba) Cubana de Aviación	Tu-204-100E	3	–	1
(Russia) Kosmos Airlines	Tu-204-100	1	–	–
(Russia) Red Wings Airlines	Tu-204-100	1	–	2
(Russia) Red Wings Airlines	Tu-214	3	–	
(Russia) Roscosmos	Tu-204-300	2	–	–
(Russia) RusJet	Tu-204-100B	1	–	–
(Russia) Russair	Tu-204-100E	1	–	–
(Russia) Russian Aerospace Forces	Tu-214	2	–	–
(Russia) Russian Post	Tu-204-100C	2	–	–
(Russia) Special Flight Squadron "Rossiya"	Tu-204-300	3	–	–
(Russia) Special Flight Squadron "Rossiya"	Tu-214	4	–	–
(Russia) Special Flight Squadron "Rossiya"	Tu-214SR	5	–	–
(Russia) Special Flight Squadron "Rossiya"	Tu-214PU	4	–	–
(Russia) UVT Aero	Tu-214	–	2	–

As is common with post-Soviet Russian aircraft, the Tupolev is a relatively rare aircraft, with only 86 examples being built as of December 2019. However, because of the 2022 sanctions, Russia aims to build at least 10 jets per year to replace its fleets.

=== Former operators ===
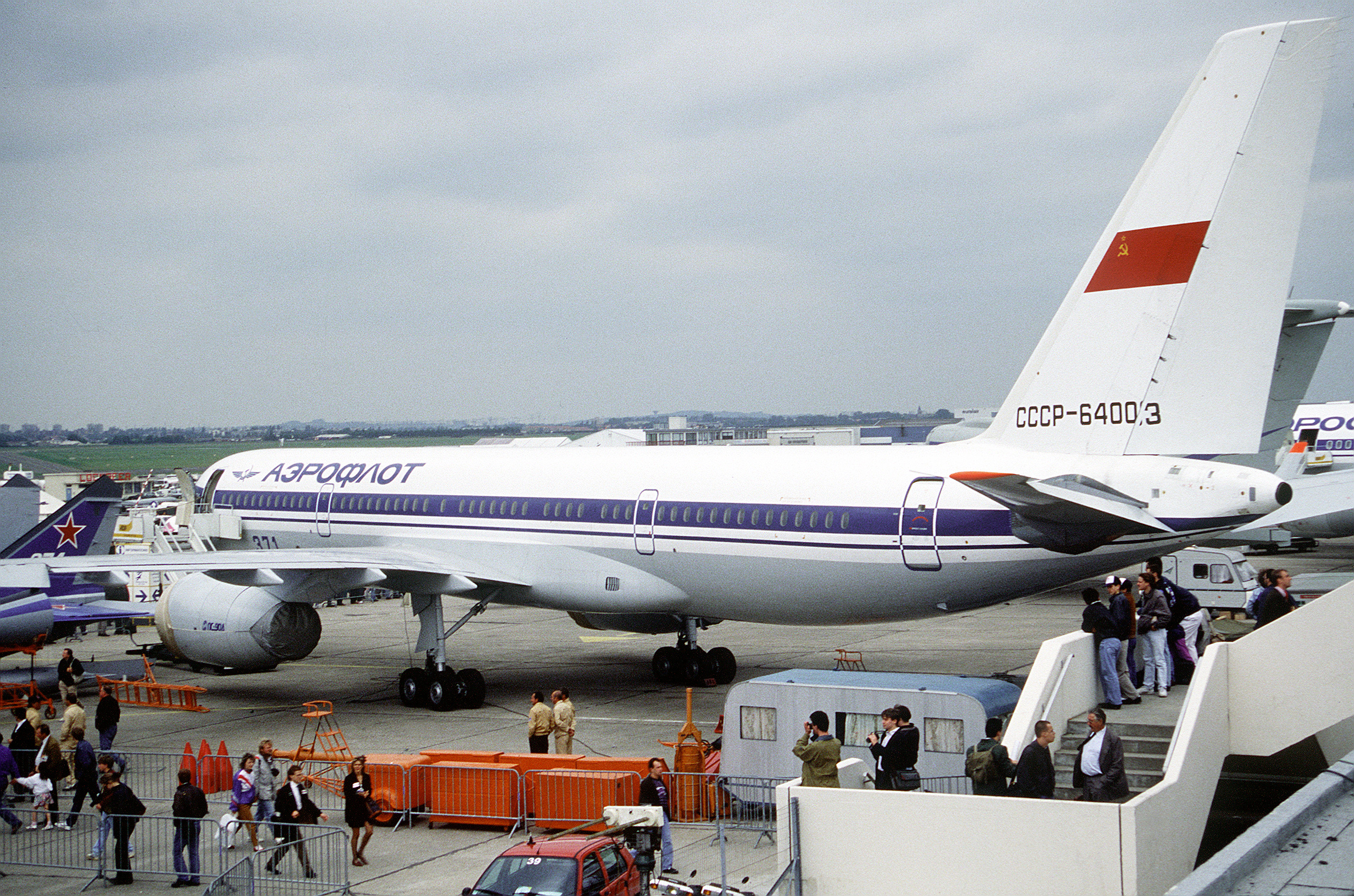
Aeroflot's previously operated Tupolev Tu-204 at the Paris Airshow

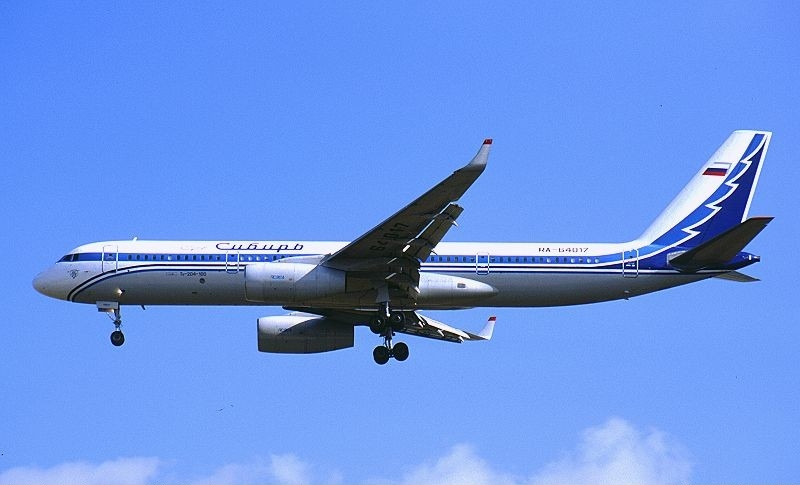
S7 Airlines (Siberia Airlines) previously operated this Tupolev Tu-204

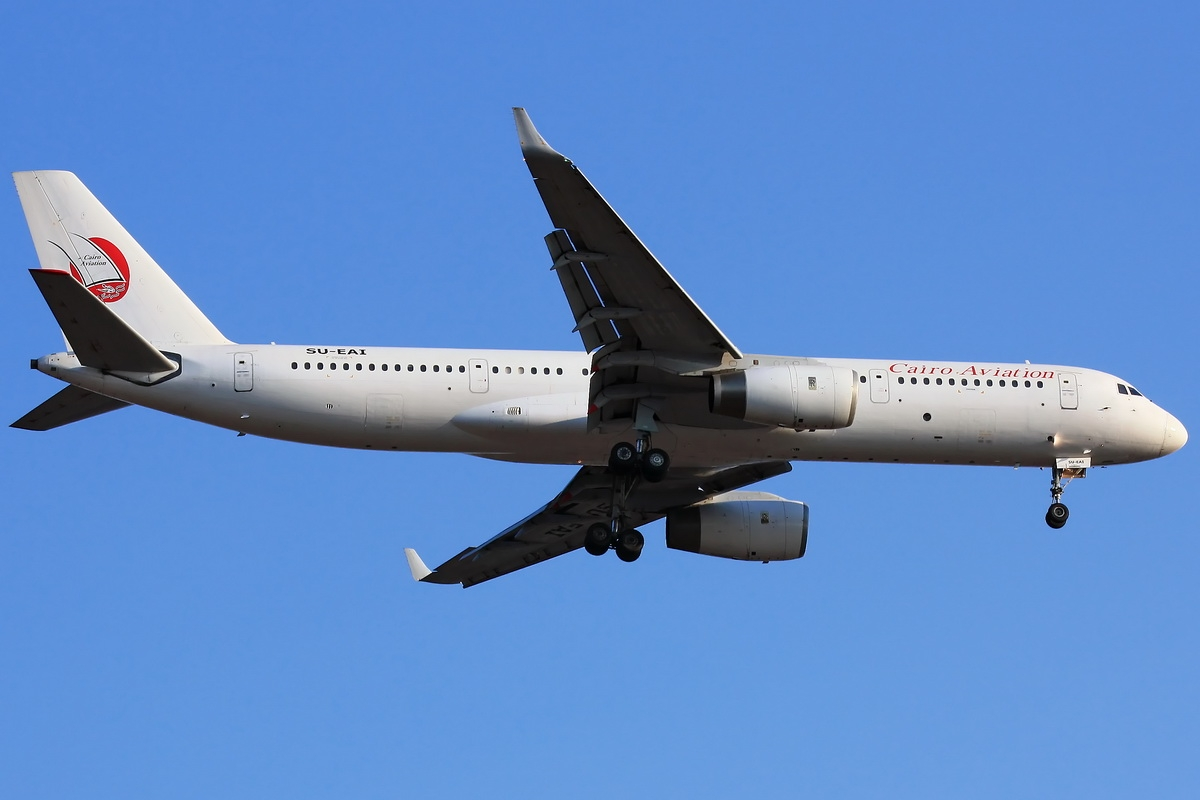
A Cairo Aviation Tupolev Tu-204 landing at Vnukovo International Airport, Moscow, Russia in 2009

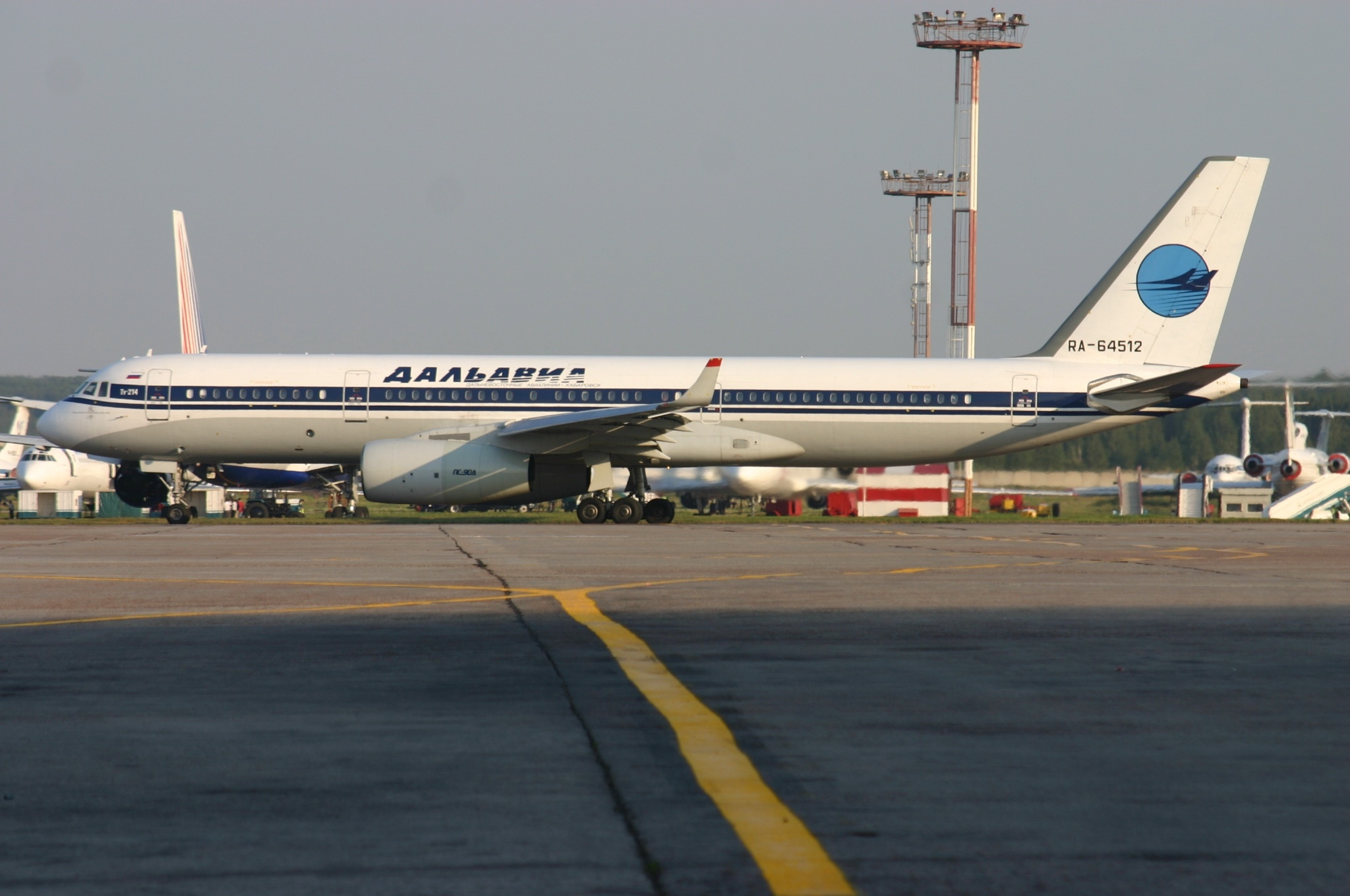
Dalavia operated this Tupolev Tu-214

Airline	Aircraft type	Year retired	Notes
(Russia) Aeroflot	Tu-204-100C	2001	Given to other airlines including Vnukovo Airlines.
Air China Cargo	Tu-204-120CE	2011	Converted to a tanker
(China) Cainiao	Tu-204-100C	2022	Operated by Aviastar-TU. Aircraft destroyed by fire at Hangzhou and written off.
(Egypt) Cairo Aviation	Tu-204-120/120C	2018	Went bankrupt in 2018.
(Russia) Dalavia	Tu-214	2009	Went bankrupt in 2009.
(Russia) Kavminvodyavia	Tu-204-100	2011	Went bankrupt in 2011.
(Russia) Kras Air	Tu-214	2008	Went bankrupt in 2008.
(Russia) Rossiya Airlines	Tu-204-100	2014	Aircraft stored inactive.
(Russia) S7 Airlines	Tu-204-100	2005	Acquired after the bankruptcy of Vnukovo Airlines.
(Russia) Transaero	Tu-214	2015	Launch customer of that type. Ceased operations in 2015.
(Russia) Vladivostok Avia	Tu-204-300	2013	Launch customer of type.
(Russia) Vnukovo Airlines	Tu-204-100	2001	Launch customer. Went bankrupt in 2001.

=== Cancelled orders ===
Airline	Aircraft type	Notes
(Germany) Blue Wings	Tu-204-100/204SM	Planned to acquire some from parent airline Red Wings Airlines. Went bankrupt in 2010.
(Russia) Omskavia	Tu-204-100	Went bankrupt in 2008.

== Production by year ==
Year	1989	1990	1991	1992	1993	1994	1995	1996	1997	1998	1999	2000	2001	2002	2003	2004	2005
Produced	1	1	2	3	5	2	1	3	1	1	2	4	3	4	4	2	3

Year	2006	2007	2008	2009	2010	2011	2012	2013	2014	2015	2016	2017	2018	2019	2020	2021	2022	2023	2024	2025	2026
Produced	4	2	10	6	4	6	1	2	1	2	2	3	1	0	2	1	0	0	1	1	1

== Specifications ==
Tupolev Tu-204 specifications
	204-100 / 204-120	214	204–300	204SM
Cockpit crew	Three			Two
Seating	172–210	180–210	142–156	176–215
Seat pitch	32–47 in	32–39 in	32–46 in	32–38 in
Length	46.14 m (151 ft 5 in)		40.19 m (131 ft 10 in)	46.14 m (151 ft 5 in)
Wing	41.8 m (137 ft 2 in) span, 184.2 m^{2} (1,983 sq ft) area			
Height	13.9 m (45 ft 7 in)			
Fuselage	3.8 m (12 ft 6 in) width x 4.1 m (13 ft 5 in) height			
Cabin	3.57 m (11 ft 9 in) width x 2.16 m (7 ft 1 in) height			
MTOW	-100: 105 t (231,000 lb) -120: 103 t (227,000 lb)	110.75 t (244,200 lb)	107 t (236,000 lb)	108 t (238,000 lb)
Max. payload	21.0 t (46,300 lb)	25.2 t (56,000 lb)	18.0 t (39,700 lb)	23.0 t (50,700 lb)
Fuel capacity	35.7 t (79,000 lb)	35.7 t (79,000 lb)	36.0 t (79,400 lb)	35.8 t (79,000 lb)
Engine (x 2)	-100: Aviadvigatel PS-90A -120: Rolls-Royce RB211-535E4B	Aviadvigatel PS-90A or Rolls-Royce RB211-535E4B		Aviadvigatel PS-90A2
Thrust (x 2)	-100: 157 kN (35,274 lbf) -120: 186 kN (41,888 lbf)	158.2 kN (35,582 lbf)		171.6 kN (38,581 lbf)
Speed	810 to 850 km/h (440 to 460 kn; 500 to 530 mph) Cruise, 900 km/h (490 kn; 560 mph) Max			
Range (Max PL)	-100: 4,300 km (2,700 mi) -120: 4,100 km (2,500 mi)	4,340 km (2,700 mi)	5,800 km (3,600 mi)	4,800 km (3,000 mi)
Takeoff (MTOW)	1,780 m (5,840 ft)	2,030 m (6,660 ft)	1,870 m (6,140 ft)	1,950 m (6,400 ft)
Ceiling	12,100 m (39,700 ft)			12,200 m (40,000 ft)

== Accidents and incidents ==
- On 14 January 2002, Siberia Airlines Flight 852, a Tupolev Tu-204-100 (RA-64011), experienced a flameout of both engines, glided and overran the runway at Omsk Airport and sustained minor damage, but was repaired and returned to service. The aircraft was later written off in a 2010 accident.
- On 22 March 2010, Aviastar-TU Flight 1906, the same aircraft involved in the Siberia Airlines Flight 852 incident, crash-landed short of the runway near Moscow Domodedovo Airport while attempting to land at night in fog and poor visibility. There were no fatalities, but four of the eight crew members were seriously injured. It was a repositioning flight with no passengers on board. In September 2010, the МАК released their final report into the accident. The cause of the accident was attributed to pilot error, with a number of factors contributing to the accident including inadequate crew training and lack of cockpit resource management, failure of autoflight systems and serious regulatory violations by Aviastar-TU. This accident was the first hull-loss of the Tu-204.
- On 29 December 2012 at 16:35 local time (12:35 GMT), Red Wings Airlines Flight 9268 crashed on landing after overrunning runway 19 at Moscow Vnukovo International Airport (VKO) following a non-revenue repositioning flight originating from Pardubice Airport, Czech Republic. The aircraft collided with an elevated highway, which launched debris at moving cars. It came to a stop 400 meters (1,300 feet) past the runway's end. There were eight crew members on board of whom five were killed and the other three seriously injured. Apart from those, one person who was driving his car on the highway was seriously injured from the nose wheel that flew across the highway. The driver behind him recorded the impact on camera. The fatal Vnukovo accident was the second runway overrun incident involving a Red Wings operated Tu-204 in nine days following a Moscow Vnukovo to Novosibirsk flight on 20 December 2012 that overran runway 25 at Tolmachevo Airport by 1,150 feet (350 meters) into an open field. Flight data recorder readouts indicate that brake failure as well as engine thrust reverser issues were major contributing causes in both overruns resulting in the issuance of additional airworthiness directives. This accident remains the sole fatal accident involving the Tu-204.
- On 24 August 2016, Aviastar-TU Flight 9625, a Tu-204S (RA-64021), was written off after landing hard at Norilsk Airport when it bounced on landing; when the aircraft taxied to its parking position, severe damage was found on the rear spar of the wing.
- On 22 August 2018, one of the Aviadvigatel PS-90 engines on Red Wings Flight 808, a Tu-204-100 (RA-64050), from Ufa to Sochi experienced an engine surge during takeoff from Ufa International Airport and subsequently caught fire. The crew did not receive any fire indications, the automatic fire suppression system did not work, and the manual fire suppression failed to fully extinguish the flames. Emergency services had put out the fire after landing while the passengers were safely evacuated through the right hand (emergency) doors via slides. There were no injuries. A Rosaviatsia (Russia's Civil Aviation Authority) commission was set up to investigate the occurrence.
- On 8 January 2022, Aviastar-TU Flight 6534, operating for Cainiao, a Chinese marketing program run by Allibaba, had severely burned out following a fire in the cockpit due to a leak in the crew oxygen supply. The aircraft was about to taxi, but the fire then started. This happened at Hangzhou Xiaoshan International Airport. The aircraft was undergoing a cargo service from Hangzhou to Novosibirsk. There were no fatalities.

== See also ==
- Aircraft industry of Russia

Related development

- Tupolev Tu-154
- Tupolev Tu-334

Aircraft of comparable role, configuration, and era

- Airbus A321
- Boeing 737-900ER
- Boeing 757
- McDonnell Douglas MD-90

Related lists

- List of jet airliners

== Sources ==
- Postlethwaite, Alan (20 May 1989). "Tupolev's new twin". Flight International. pp. 44–46.
- Кощеев, А. Б.; Платонов, А. А.; Храбров, А. В. (2009). Аэродинамика самолётов семейства Ту-204/214. Учебное пособие [Aerodynamics of aircraft of the Tu-204/214 family. Tutorial]. Moscow: Poligon-Press. ISBN 978-5-98734-019-6.
