= Aviastar =

Aviastar may refer to:

- Aviastar (Indonesia), Indonesian now-defunct airline
- Aviastar-TU, Russian cargo and charter airline
