= Aviastar-TU =

Russian airline

Aviastar-TU Airlines Авиастар-ТУ
IATA	ICAO	Call sign
4B	TUP	TUPOLEVAIR
- Founded: 2000; 26 years ago
- Commenced operations: March 2000
- Hubs: Zhukovsky International Airport
- Secondary hubs: Moscow Domodedovo Airport; Vnukovo International Airport
- Fleet size: 9
- Parent company: Aviastar-SP
- Headquarters: Zhukovsky, Russia
- Key people: Ivan Ivanovich Sukhomlin (General Director)
- Website: www.aviastartu.com

Aviastar-TU Airlines (Russian: Авиастар-ТУ) is a Russian cargo charter airline which operates principally out of Ramenskoye Airport in Moscow, Russia. Its headquarters is located in Zhukovsky, Moscow Oblast. It is currently banned from flying into the EU like all other Russian airlines.

== History ==
The airline began operating domestic and international charter flights in 2000. Aviastar-TU, as an aircraft operator, has a historical affiliation with Aviastar-SP, an aircraft builder.

After the incident of Flight 1906, the Federal Air Transport Agency imposed a ban on passenger transport due to the airline's lack of a spare aircraft. In November 2011, after a number of deficiencies were identified by European inspectors, the European Aviation Safety Agency also imposed an additional ban on flights to EU countries, which was lifted at the end of December 2011.

On 8 April 2022, the US Department of Commerce restricted flights on aircraft manufactured in the US for Aeroflot, Aviastar, Azur Air, Belavia, Rossiya and Utair. It seems the US wants to reclaim ownership of the intellectual property. On 16 June, the US broadened its restrictions on the six airlines after violations of the sanctions regime were detected. The effect of the restrictions is to ground the US-manufactured part of its fleet.

== Fleet ==
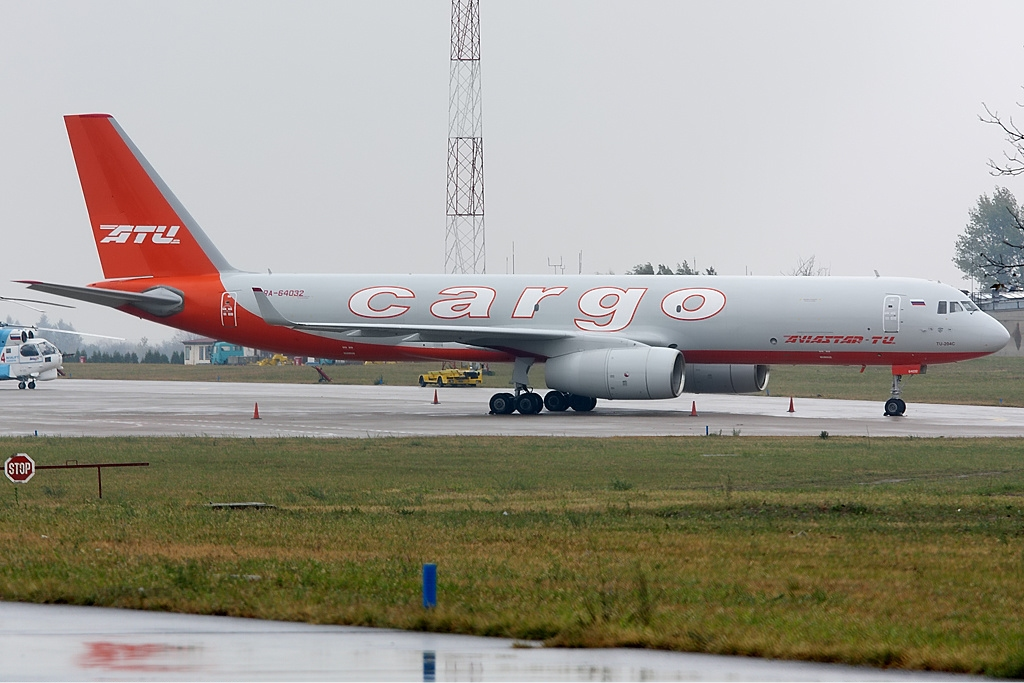
Aviastar-TU Tupolev Tu-204

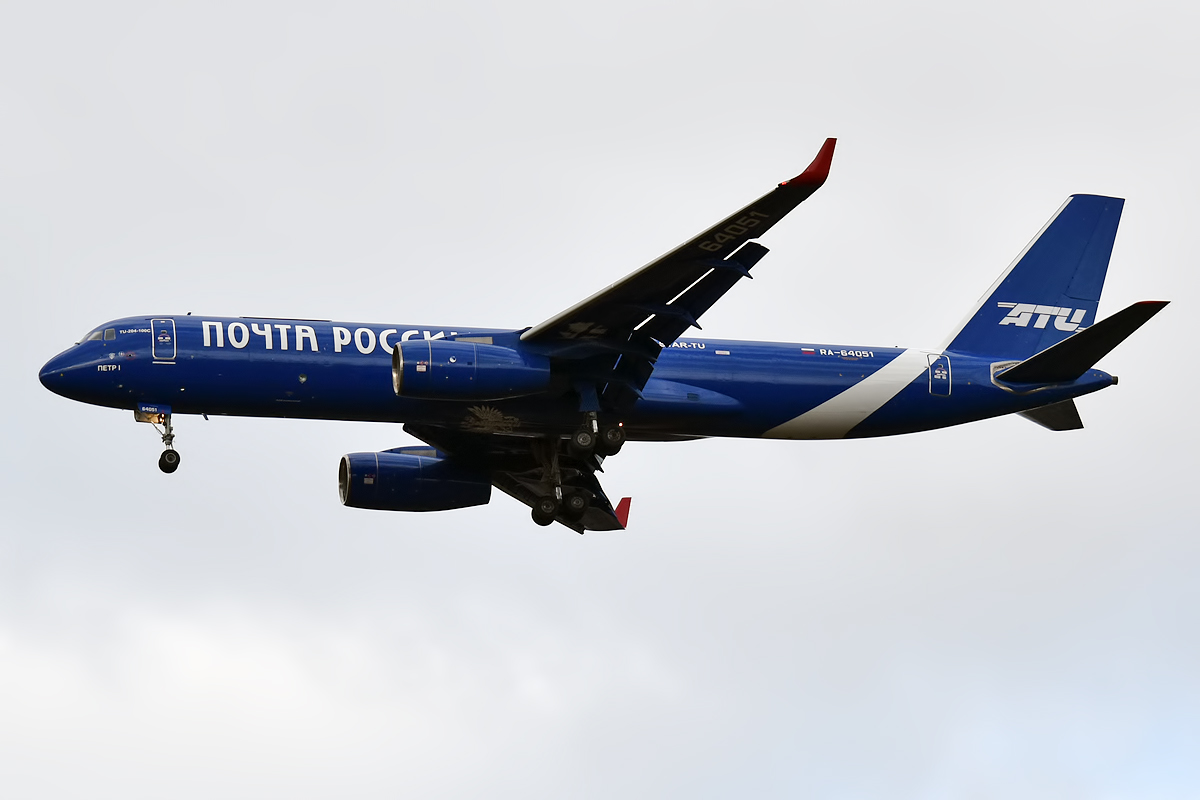
Aviastar-TU Tupolev Tu-204 in Russian Post livery

=== Current fleet ===
As of August 2025, Aviastar-TU operates the following aircraft:

Aviastar-TU Airlines fleet
Aircraft	In service	Orders	Notes
Boeing 757-200PCF	5	—	
Tupolev Tu-204-100	1	—	
Tupolev Tu-204-100C	3	—	
Total	9	—	

=== Former fleet ===
Aviastar-TU fleet formerly operated the following aircraft:

Aviastar-TU Airlines former fleet
Aircraft	Total	Introduced	Retired	Notes
Tupolev Tu-204-100	4	2000	2010	
Tupolev Tu-204-300	1	2003	2004	Transferred to Vladivostok Air.

== Accidents and incidents ==
- On 15 November 1993, Aviastar Airlines Flight 051, an Antonov AN-124-100 (RA-82071) crashed on approach to Kerman Airport, Iran after being instructed to enter a holding pattern. The aircraft failed to follow the established holding pattern and crashed 35 Kilometers east of Kerman, Iran. All 17 on board were killed and the aircraft was written off
- On 22 March 2010, Aviastar-TU Flight 1906, a Tupolev Tu-204-100 (RA-64011) crashed on approach to Moscow Domodedovo International Airport. Only eight crew members were on board, and all of them survived. Immediately upon the accident, the Russian aviation supervisory authority suspended Aviastar-TU from carrying passengers, pending an examination of the airline's flight operations. In September 2010, the Russian aviation supervisory authority, МАК, released its final report into the accident. The cause of the accident was attributed to pilot error, with a number of factors contributing to the accident including inadequate crew training and lack of cockpit resource management, failure of autoflight systems and regulatory violations by Aviastar-TU.
- On 24 August 2016, a Tupolev Tu-204-100C (RA-64021) operating Flight 9625, suffered a hard landing at Alykel Airport. Information from the investigation shows that the aircraft bounced on touchdown, the spoilers then automatically extended, after which the aircraft landed hard with an acceleration of +3,05G. The aircraft taxied to the parking position, where examination revealed that the rear spar of the wing sustained. All 4 crew members on board were safely evacuated.
- On 8 January 2022, Aviastar-TU Flight 6534, a Tupolev Tu-204-100C (RA-64032) operating for Cainiao, was written off after a fire caused by an oxygen leak in the cockpit started during pushback from its gate at Hangzhou Xiaoshan International Airport and burnt through the fuselage, causing the rear of the aircraft to collapse. All 8 crew members on board were safely evacuated.

== See also ==
- List of airlines of Russia
