= Borisoglebskoye Airfield =

Borisoglebskoye airfield
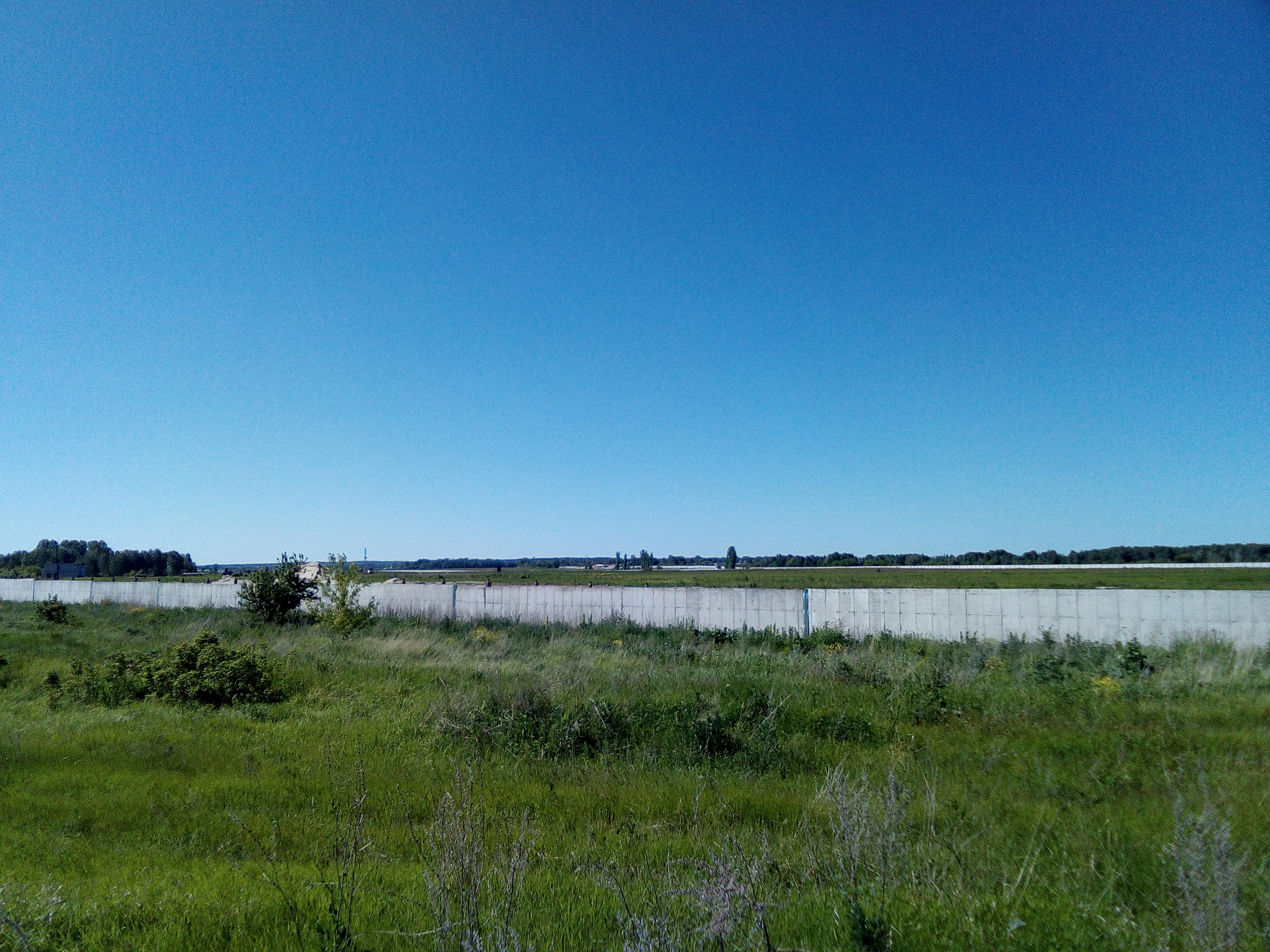
- Borisoglebskoye

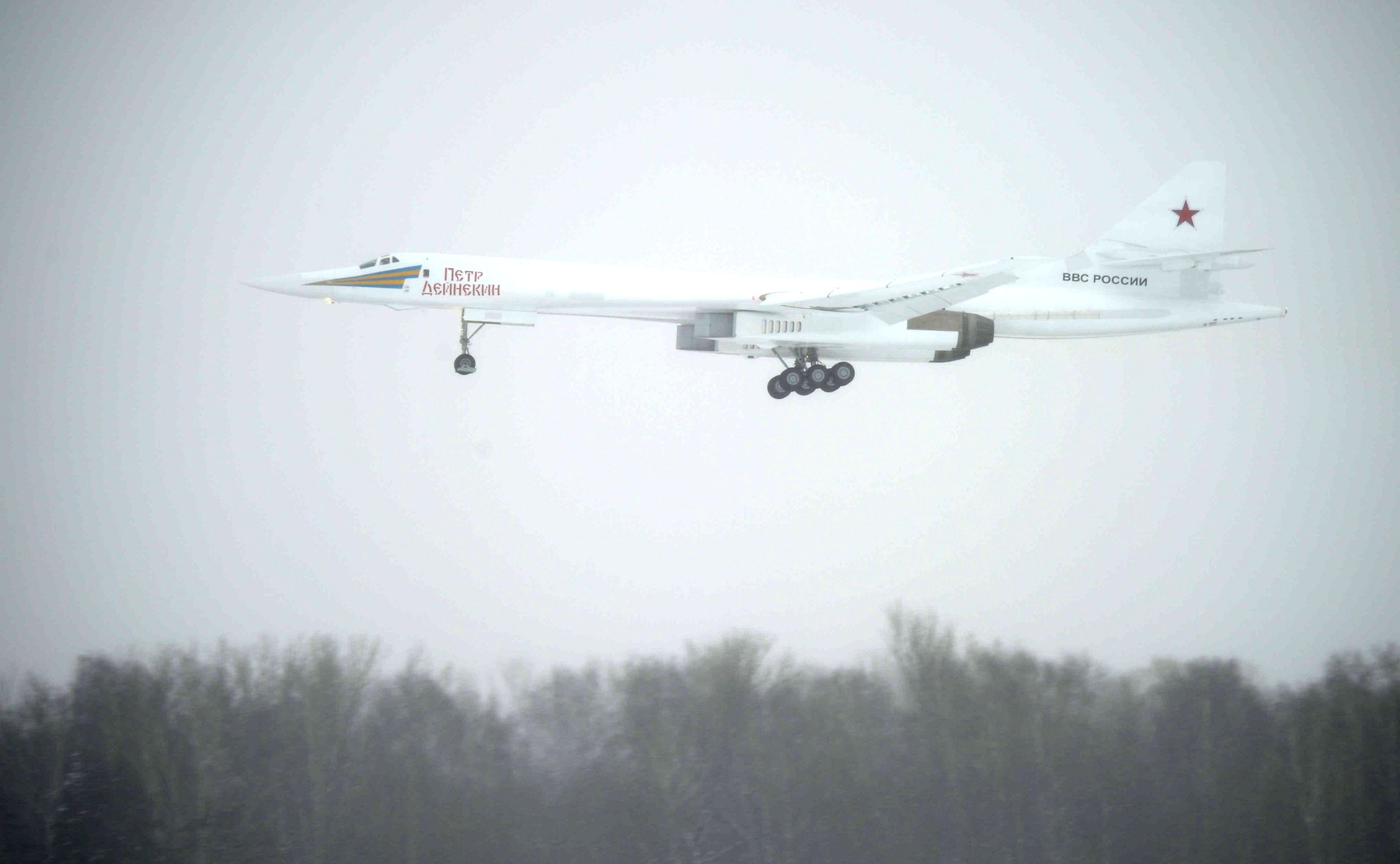
- Tu-160 at Borisoglebskoye during visit of Vladimir Putin in 2018
- IATA: none; ICAO: UWKG

Summary
- Airport type: pilot / military
- Operator: KAPO/Russian Air Force
- Location: Kazan, Tatarstan
- Elevation AMSL: 213 ft / 65 m
- Coordinates: 55°52′0″N 49°8′0″E
- Website: https://oaokapo.ru/
- Interactive map of Borisoglebskoye airfield

Runways
Direction	Length		Surface
Direction	ft	m	Surface
11/29	10,499	3,200	Concrete

Borisoglebskoye airfield (Tatar: Borisoglebskiy Hawa Alanı, Russian: Аэродром Борисоглебское) (ICAO: UWKG) is an experimental aviation airfield owned by Kazan Aircraft Production Association (Tupolev). Located in the northeastern part of the city of Kazan, in the immediate vicinity of the borough Borisoglebskoe, it is designed for experimental design, experimental work, and testing aircraft products. It is where the Kazan State Aviation Plant is located.

Since the late 1980s at the airport, Naddanom conducted test flights of Russian strategic bombers like the Tupolev Tu-160 (Blackjack), as well as passenger airliners such as the mid-range Tupolev Tu-214.

The airfield is capable of accepting all types of modern aircraft, due to the characteristics of the runway.

== See also ==
- List of airports in Russia
