= Aviastar-TU Flight 6534 =

2022 aircraft accident in China

- Wreckage of the aircraft after the fire

Accident
- Date: 8 January 2022
- Summary: Ground fire due to oxygen leak in cockpit
- Site: Hangzhou Xiaoshan International Airport, Hangzhou, China; 30°13.95′N 120°25.72′E (Note: Coordinates calculated using the map provided in the final report.)

Aircraft
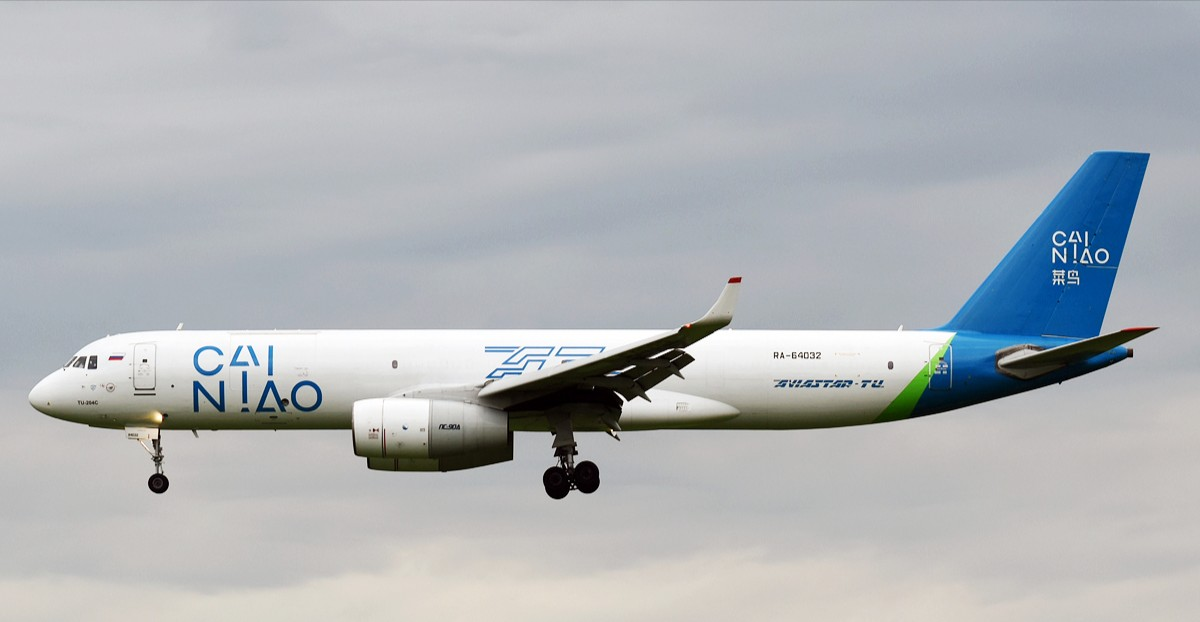
- RA-64032, the aircraft involved in the accident, photographed in June 2021
- Aircraft type: Tupolev Tu-204-100C
- Operator: Aviastar-TU
- IATA flight No.: 4B6534
- ICAO flight No.: TUP6534
- Call sign: TUPOLEVAIR 6534
- Registration: RA-64032
- Flight origin: Hangzhou Xiaoshan International Airport, Hangzhou, China
- Destination: Tolmachevo Airport, Novosibirsk, Russia
- Occupants: 8
- Passengers: 0
- Crew: 8
- Fatalities: 0
- Injuries: 3
- Survivors: 8

Aviastar-TU Flight 6534 was a scheduled international cargo flight from Hangzhou Xiaoshan International Airport in Hangzhou, China to Tolmachevo Airport in Novosibirsk, Russia. On 8 January 2022, the Tupolev Tu-204 operating the flight caught fire during pushback. The 8 crew members on board were able to evacuate, with 3 sustaining minor injuries. Investigators attributed the accident to an oxygen leak in the cockpit.

== Background ==
=== Aircraft ===
The aircraft involved was a Tupolev Tu-204-100C freighter registered as RA-64032, and was originally delivered to Perm Airlines in 2002. The aircraft had been a part of Aviastar-TU's fleet since 2004. In 2019, the aircraft was repainted in the corporate colours of the Chinese shipping company Cainiao, and it was operating a flight for Cainiao at the time of the accident. The aircraft was fitted with two PS-90A engines and had a maximum payload of 28,500 kg.

=== Crew ===
On board the flight were 8 crew members. The captain was a 60 year old Russian male with 12,587 hours of flight experience, the first officer was a 62 year old Russian male with 3,876 hours of flight experience, and the flight engineer was a 61 year old Russian male with 15,803 hours of flight experience. Also on board were a relief captain, a relief first officer, a relief flight engineer, and two maintenance technicians.

== Accident ==
The aircraft began pushback from stand 204 at 04:34:37 local time, for a scheduled departure time of 04:40. In accordance with the preflight checklist, the First Officer pressed the test button of the oxygen mask to his right at 04:34:54. This initiated an oxygen gas leakage that lasted for 2 minutes 25 seconds. There were three flashes of flame during this time, which resulted in a rapidly developing fire in the cockpit.

The area where the fire extinguisher was located in the cockpit was covered by the flames, so the crew opened the cockpit door and asked the relief crew for the other portable fire extinguisher. The aircraft stopped moving at 04:35:17 and the crew began evacuating. The escape rope storage boxes in the cockpit were engulfed by the fire, rendering them unusable during the evacuation. As a result, the crew members had to jump from the exits 3.9 metres (12 feet) above the ground to escape the plane, as the aircraft was not fitted with inflatable slides. All crewmembers had evacuated the aircraft by 04:38:02, with three sustaining minor injuries during the evacuation after jumping down from the plane.

Emergency crews arrived at the burning aircraft within two minutes. The fire spread throughout the interior of the plane into the cargo hold, eventually burning through the roof and breaking the airframe into three main pieces. Videos captured by the public showed smoke billowing out of the fuselage behind the cockpit. The fire was extinguished by emergency services by 09:40, and other operations at the airport were not affected. The aircraft was damaged beyond repair.

== Investigation ==
An investigation was opened by the Eastern Regional Administration of the Civil Aviation Administration of China, with an English translation of the final report released by Russia's Interstate Aviation Committee (MAK).

CCTV footage recorded at the airport showed the fire sequence inside the cockpit. Potential causes of fire including arson, cigarettes, and lithium-ion batteries were ruled out by investigators. The origin of the fire was determined to be that:

The crew oxygen system components inside the right-hand console malfunctioned and resulted in oxygen leakage, and then the leaking oxygen formed an ephemeral oxygen-rich environment in the confined space. The heat generated or emitted from the aircraft components and systems in this area ignited the combustible materials in the oxygen-rich environment.

The leaking oxygen then exacerbated the development and spread of the fire. The cause of the malfunction was not stated. The investigation resulted in recommendations to check the crew oxygen systems on Tu-204 and Tu-214 aircraft to ensure the absence of leaks.

== See also ==
- EgyptAir Flight 804 - Another aircraft that was brought down by a fire caused by an oxygen leak in the cockpit, according to the BEA.
- Kolavia Flight 348
- Air Busan Flight 391
