= Kolavia Flight 348 =

2011 aviation incident

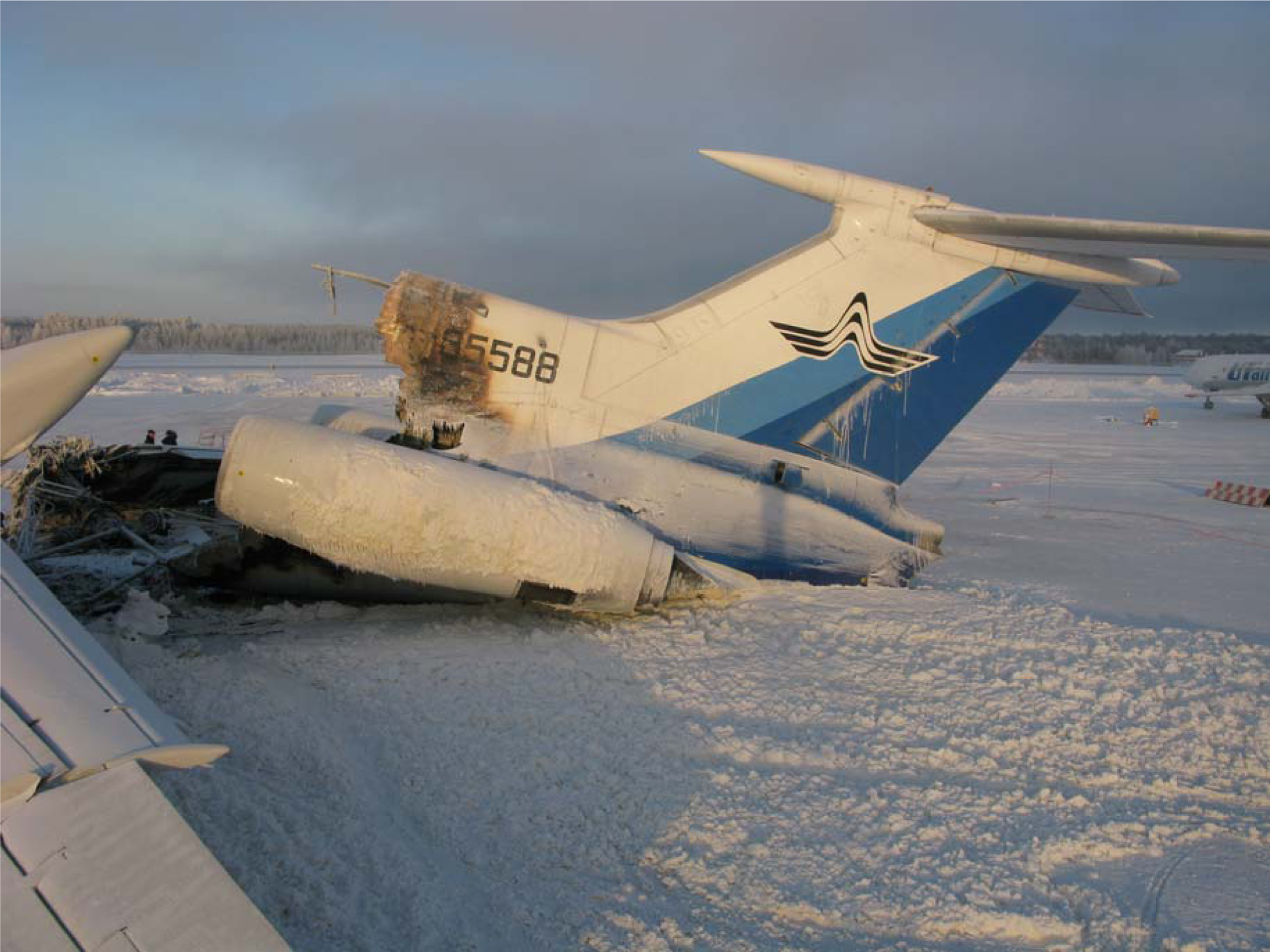
- The tail section of RA-85588 after the fire

Accident
- Date: 1 January 2011
- Summary: Electrical fire during taxiing
- Site: Surgut International Airport, Surgut, Russia; 61°20′30″N 73°24′10″E

Aircraft
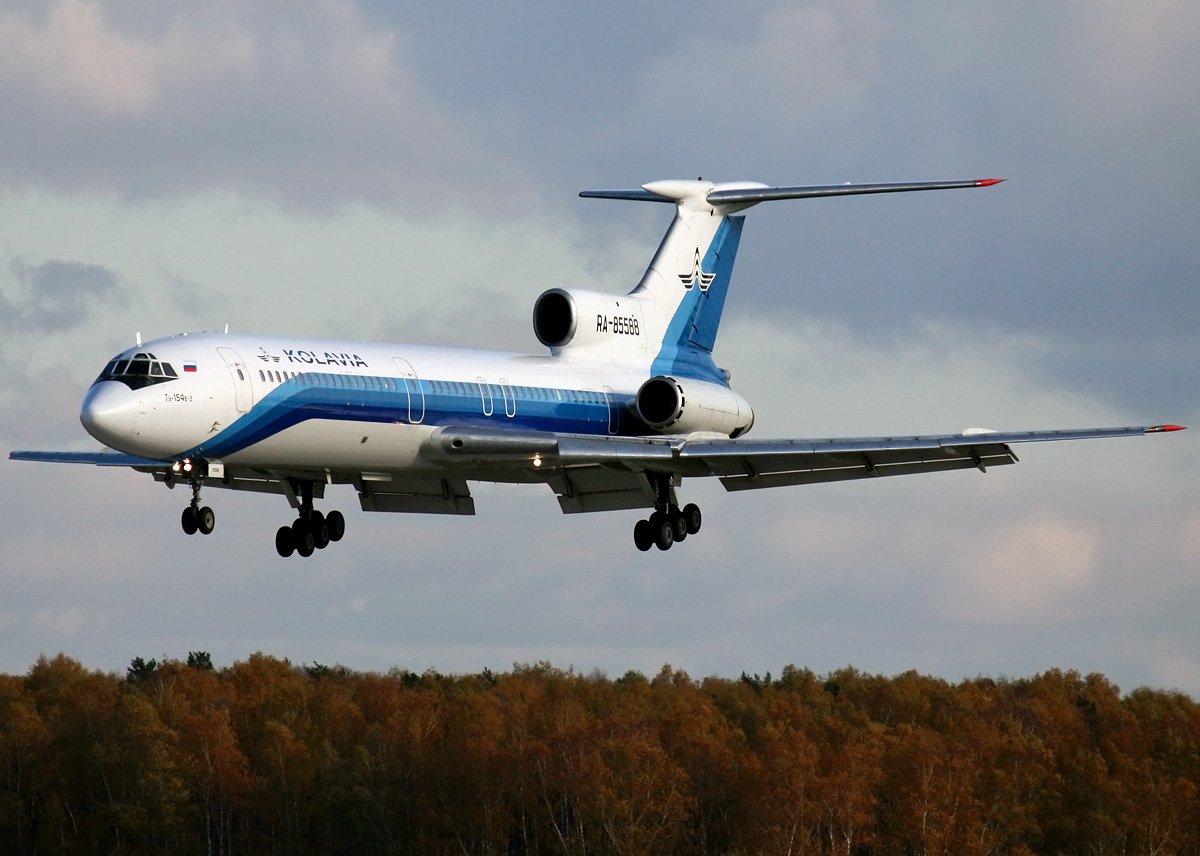
- RA-85588, the Tu-154 involved, seen in 2010
- Aircraft type: Tupolev Tu-154B-2
- Operator: Kogalymavia
- IATA flight No.: 7K348
- ICAO flight No.: KGL348
- Call sign: KOGALYM348
- Registration: RA-85588
- Flight origin: Surgut International Airport, Surgut, Russia
- Destination: Domodedovo International Airport, Moscow, Russia
- Occupants: 134
- Passengers: 126
- Crew: 8
- Fatalities: 3
- Injuries: 43
- Survivors: 131

On 1 January 2011, Kolavia Flight 348, a Tupolev Tu-154 on a domestic scheduled passenger flight from Surgut to Moscow, Russia, caught fire while taxiing out for take-off. Passengers were evacuated, but three were killed and 43 injured. A subsequent investigation concluded that the fire had started in an electric panel for which maintenance was never prescribed.

== Accident ==
On the morning of 1 January 2011, Flight 348 was preparing to depart at Surgut International Airport for a flight to Moscow. At 10:00 local time (05:00 UTC), as the aircraft was being pushed back and was starting its engines, a fire developed in the centre section of the fuselage, quickly spreading inside the passenger cabin.

The engines and the APU were immediately shut down and the emergency slides were deployed. Within four minutes, fire engines reached the Tupolev and started dousing the flames with foam, but were hampered by the presence of survivors near the aircraft. By 10:20, the aircraft was completely ablaze, with aviation fuel leaking and spreading the flames across the apron.

The fire was brought under control at around 10:40; by then, only the tail section and the outer portion of the wings had survived the blaze. Three passengers were killed and 43 were injured, four critically, from smoke inhalation or burns.

== Aircraft ==
The aircraft involved was a tri-jet Tupolev Tu-154B-2, registration RA-85588, msn 83A/588. The aircraft first flew in 1983. It entered service with Aeroflot as CCCP-85588 and was re-registered RA-85588 in 1993. It then served with Mavial Magadan Airlines between 1994 and 1999, when it began service with Vladivostok Air. Kogalymavia (trading as Kolavia) acquired the aircraft in 2007.

== Passengers and crew ==
The aircraft was carrying 116 passengers, 8 crew, and 10 off-duty employees of Kogalymavia, although a statement by the Russia's Ministry of Health and Social Development gave figures of 117 passengers and 18 crew. Among the passengers were members of the 1990s Russian boy band Na Na, who managed to evacuate safely from the plane.

== Aftermath ==
Following the accident, Russia's Federal Transport Oversight Agency advised airlines that they should stop using the Tu-154B until the accident had been investigated.

== Investigation ==
MAK's final investigation report

Russia's Interstate Aviation Committee (MAK) opened an investigation into the accident. A separate criminal investigation was opened to investigate allegations of breaching transport and fire safety rules. Both flight recorders were recovered and analysed. Russia's Ministry of Emergency Situations stated that the initial investigations pointed towards an electrical short circuit being the cause of the fire, which started in the central area of the fuselage, ahead of the rear-mounted engines.

In September 2011, the MAK released its final report in Russian, confirming that the probable cause of the fire was an arc occurring in an electric panel on the right side of the fuselage hosting the generator contactors. Shortly after engine start, the crew connected the generators to the electrical network as usual, but the badly worn out contactors failed to operate properly, resulting in an abnormal circuit configuration that produced currents 10 to 20 times higher than their nominal values, giving rise to an electrical arc. The MAK determined that no maintenance schedule existed for the electric board in question.

== See also ==
- Air Busan Flight 391
- Aviastar-TU Flight 6534
