= Cairo Aviation =

Charter airline of Egypt

IATA	ICAO	Call sign
OE	CCE	–
- Founded: November 1998
- Ceased operations: 2018
- Hubs: Cairo International Airport
- Fleet size: 4
- Destinations: mainly Egypt and Europe
- Headquarters: Cairo, Egypt
- Key people: Ibrahim Kamel (President), Emad Sallam (VP-CEO)
- Website: www.cairoaviation.com.eg

Cairo Aviation was a former charter airline based in Cairo, Egypt.

== History ==
Cairo Aviation is a charter company operating Tupolev Tu-204-120 passenger aircraft and Tu-204-120C all-cargo aircraft on a dry lease basis from Sirocco Aerospace International.

Beside domestic routes in Egypt, the company mainly operated on international routes to various destinations in Europe, Africa and the Middle East. Furthermore, Cairo Aviation operated scheduled flights for the national carrier Egypt Air on many occasions.

Being a sister company to Sirocco Aerospace international, Cairo Aviation was a test vehicle for the Tu-204-120 aircraft when it first entered service. Sirocco was testing many aspects of projected- versus actual operating costs; dispatch reliability; noise and emissions levels; and component wear and tear among many other things. Satisfied with the results, Sirocco began aggressive sales and marketing efforts for its aircraft.

== Destinations ==
In July 2017, Cairo Aviation operated the following scheduled routes:

=== Egypt ===
- Cairo - Cairo International Airport

=== Saudi Arabia ===
- Jeddah - King Abdulaziz International Airport
- Yanbu - Yanbu Airport

== Fleet ==
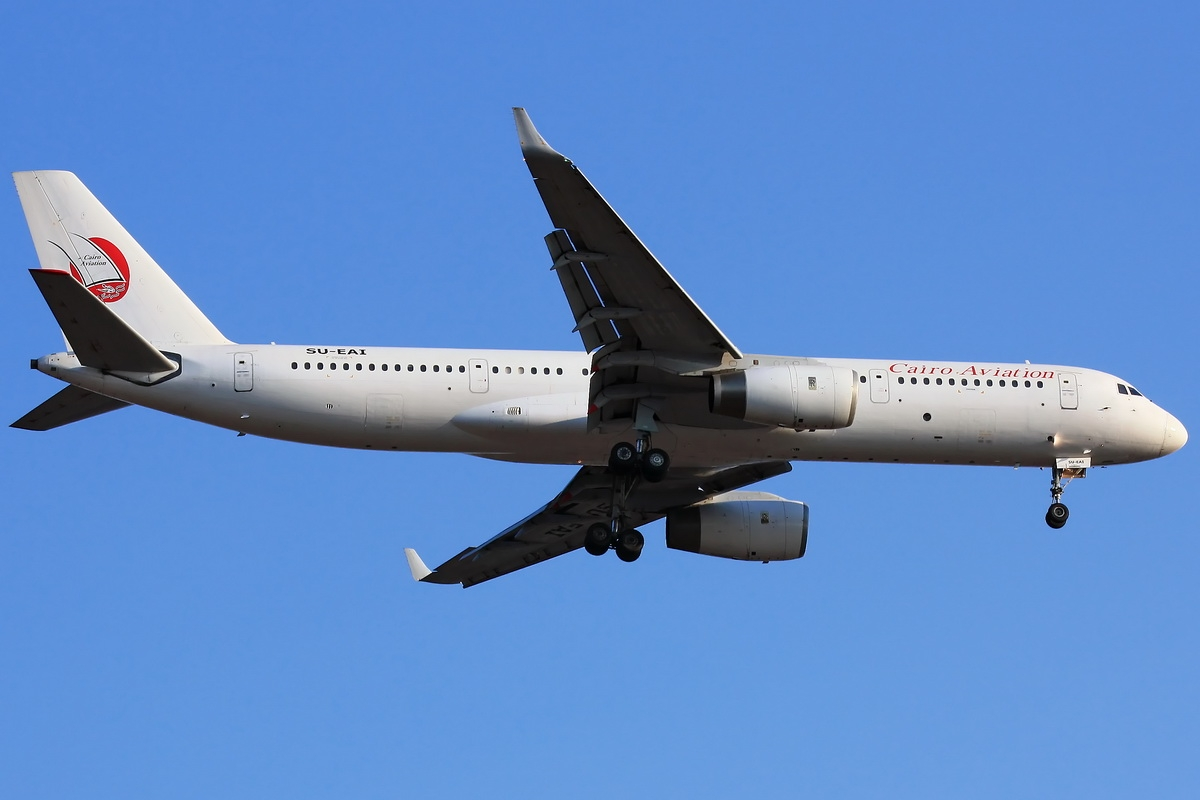
A Cairo Aviation Tupolev Tu-204 landing at Vnukovo International Airport, Moscow, Russia in 2009.

=== Final fleet ===
The Cairo Aviation fleet consisted of the following aircraft in August 2018:

Cairo Aviation fleet
Aircraft	In service	Orders	Passengers	Notes
Tupolev Tu-204-120	2	—	210	
Irkut MC-21-300	—	6	TBA	
Cargo fleet
Tupolev Tu-204-120C	2	—	Cargo	1 stored
Total	4	6		
