= Air Busan Flight 391 =

2025 aircraft accident in South Korea

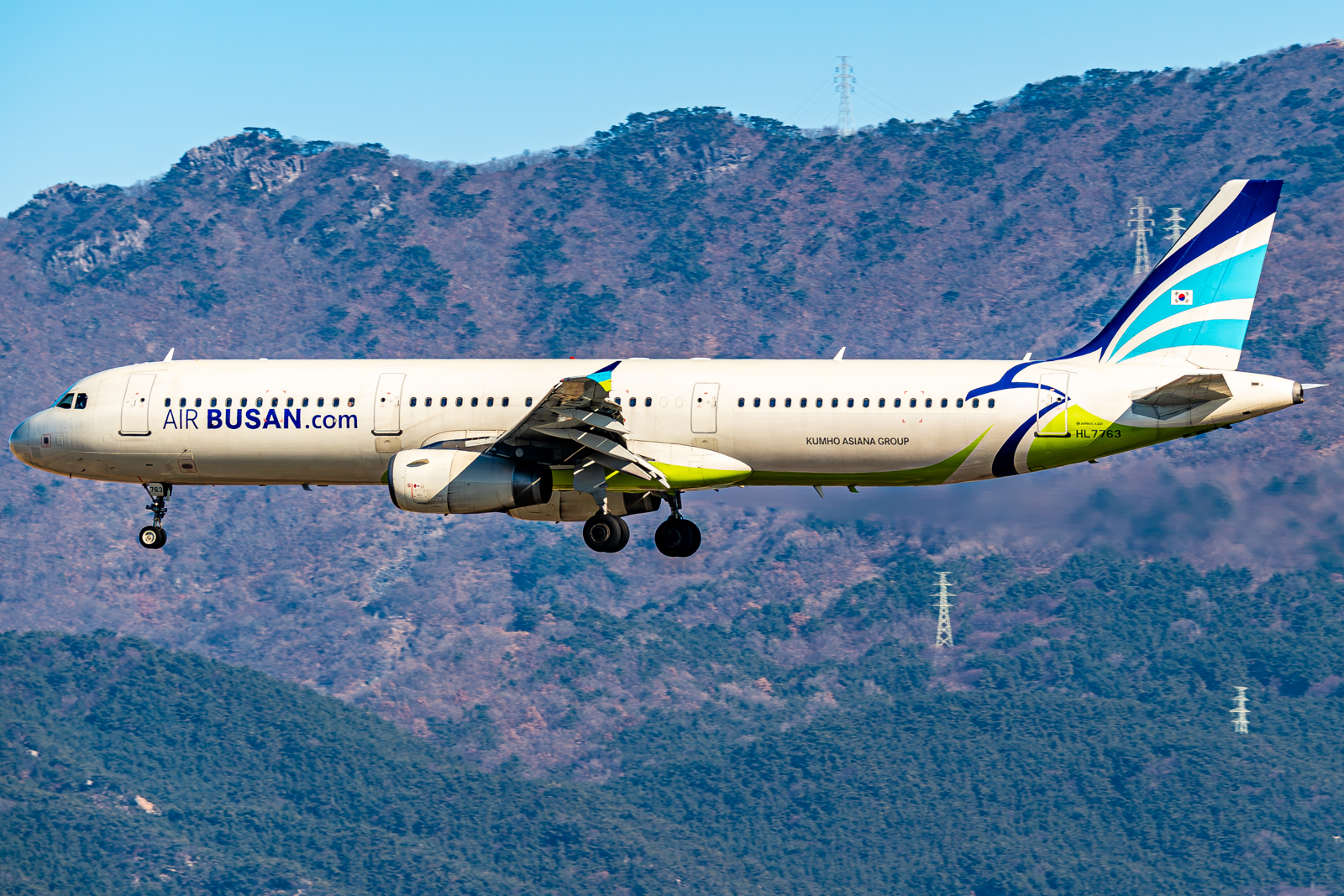
- HL7763, the aircraft involved in the accident, photographed in 2024

Accident
- Date: 28 January 2025
- Summary: Ground fire due to fault of a portable battery bank in an overhead compartment
- Site: Gimhae International Airport, Busan, South Korea; 35°10.6′N 128°56.8′E

Aircraft
- Aircraft type: Airbus A321-231
- Operator: Air Busan
- IATA flight No.: BX391
- ICAO flight No.: ABL391
- Call sign: AIR BUSAN 391
- Registration: HL7763
- Flight origin: Gimhae International Airport, Busan, South Korea
- Destination: Hong Kong International Airport, Hong Kong
- Occupants: 176
- Passengers: 169
- Crew: 7
- Fatalities: 0
- Injuries: 3
- Survivors: 176

Air Busan Flight 391 was a scheduled international passenger flight operated by Air Busan from Gimhae International Airport in Busan, South Korea, to Hong Kong International Airport in Hong Kong. On 28 January 2025, the Airbus A321 caught fire while preparing to taxi for takeoff. The fire resulted in 3 injuries and the evacuation of all 176 occupants on board the aircraft, which was destroyed by the flames and deemed a total loss.

== Background ==
=== Aircraft ===
The aircraft involved was an Airbus A321 registered as HL7763 and had been in service since 2008, having previously been operated by Asiana Airlines. It was delivered to Air Busan on 1 June 2017.

=== Passengers and crew ===
There were 169 passengers and 6 crew members aboard the plane, as well as 1 maintenance engineer. Most passengers were travelling for the Lunar New Year holidays. The passengers also included 22 foreign nationals, including 18 Chinese, 2 Americans, 1 British and 1 Filipino. The captain had logged 6,552 flight hours, including 5,510 hours on the Airbus A321, 2,795 of which were as a captain. The first officer had 3,278 flight hours, with 2,859 of them on the Airbus A321. The captain and first officer had flown 168 and 160 hours respectively, in the past 90 days before the accident.

== Accident ==
The aircraft was about to taxi following a 20-minute delay when a fire broke out at the rear tail section at around 22:26 KST and spread through the empennage and nearly half of its fuselage. Air Busan said that the fire was spotted by a crew member on an overhead compartment near the rear left side of the cabin. Some passengers said the fire broke following a 'crackling' sound. Another passenger said the crew failed to order the evacuation of passengers near the source of the fire and told them to remain seated while they initially tried to put out the flames using a fire extinguisher, by which time embers had already spread to other parts of the aircraft. Other passengers also accused the airline of not having 'a proper protocol or manual in place', as airline officials only told them to go home or to the nearest hotel without other instructions.

The airline said that the crew had no time to make an official announcement to the passengers regarding the fire, but said that it had followed all appropriate procedures, adding that the captain immediately shut down the aircraft's hydraulic and fuel systems to prevent secondary damage after being informed by the crew about the fire. Air Busan also said that its crew had prevented a passenger from opening the affected overhead compartment to put out the flames with a fire extinguisher, saying that it would have fed more oxygen to the fire and cause it to intensify.

All 176 people on board evacuated safely using inflatable slides, including one that was opened by a passenger. Seven minor injuries were reported from the fire; four crew members experienced chest discomfort due to smoke inhalation, while three elderly passengers experienced pain in their backs and coccyx. The fire generated holes along the length of the fuselage roof. Firefighters arrived at the scene at 22:34 KST. The fire was put out at 23:31 KST before it could reach the aircraft's wings, which carried 35,000 pounds (approximately 15,876 kg) of fuel.

The fire was the first significant safety event involving Air Busan since 2013.

== Investigation ==
Acting president and prime minister Choi Sang-mok ordered a thorough investigation into the accident. The Ministry of Land, Infrastructure and Transport (MLIT) deployed officials to the site and established an emergency response team. The flight data recorders were recovered following the fire, while a team from the French Bureau of Enquiry and Analysis for Civil Aviation Safety was also sent to investigate the incident on account of the origins of the aircraft's manufacturer. Authorities declared that the removal of the aircraft's fuel was not necessary for investigators to search the aircraft following safety checks. A joint investigation by the ministry and the bureau into the fire began on 3 February, with police and the National Forensic Service also taking samples from inside the aircraft and with only 12 people allowed inside the fuselage due to safety concerns.

On 7 February, police raided Gimhae International Airport as part of efforts to secure evidence, particularly footage from surveillance cameras taken at the time of the fire.

Amid suspicions that the fire was caused by a battery that had been placed inside a carry-on bag in the overhead compartment, the South Korean government was reported to be reviewing procedures on the handling of batteries inside aircraft. On 13 February 2025, the MLIT announced a ban on South Korean airlines from storing portable battery banks and e-cigarettes in overhead storage compartments beginning on 1 March. It also barred passengers from charging power banks or electronic cigarettes using USB ports installed on airplane seats and limited the maximum number of power banks allowed to be carried by a passenger to five. Taiwan's EVA Air prohibited the use of portable chargers on all its flights, starting from the same date as the South Korean ban.

The preliminary report was released on 27 February and found that the fire broke out ten minutes after air traffic controllers ordered the aircraft's takeoff to be delayed, the captain instructing everyone on board to be evacuated one minute after the fire was detected. On 14 March, authorities said that the fire was likely caused by insulation breaking down inside a power bank battery stored in an overhead luggage compartment.

== Responses ==
=== Airline ===
Air Busan stated that its emergency response team were contacting the passengers and crew on board. The carrier later announced a temporary prohibition on passengers stowing portable power banks in hand luggage placed in overhead bins as a safety precaution. Air Busan also issued a formal apology to the affected passengers.

=== Investigators and regulators ===
A formal investigation by the Aviation and Railway Accident Investigation Board (ARAIB), the findings of which were published in a preliminary report, revealed that the fire started in an overhead luggage bin whilst the aircraft was preparing for departure. This was a result of the discovery of burn marks on remnants of a battery recovered from the area where the fire originated, which led investigators to believe that a lithium-ion power bank was the source of ignition.

This incident prompted Korean regulators to make guidelines for carrying portable chargers with lithium-ion batteries. South Korea's transport authorities also coordinated with the ARAIB and other relevant authorities for urging airlines and passengers to follow these stricter guidelines.

=== Manufacturer and industry ===
Airbus, being made aware of the reports of this incident, stated that it was providing technical assistance to, and coordinating with, Air Busan and the relevant investigators.

This incident also prompted many regulatory authorities and airlines around the world, such as Singapore Airlines, Scoot, Thai Airways, EVA Air and China Airlines to review and update their guidelines for carrying portable lithium-ion devices such as power banks in cabin baggage, with some going as far as reviewing and updating their guidelines for checked luggage also, citing heightened risks.

== See also ==
- Kolavia Flight 348 - Another aircraft that caught fire mid-taxi before takeoff.
- Uni Air Flight 873 - Another aircraft that caught fire possibly from a passenger's belongings.
- Aviastar-TU Flight 6534 - Another aircraft which caught fire before taxi.
- China Airlines Flight 120
- Saudia Flight 163
- British Airtours Flight 28M
