= Cainiao =

Chinese logistics and package delivery company

- Industry: Logistics
- Founded: 2013; 13 years ago
- Headquarters: Hangzhou, China
- Key people: Jack Ma (Chairman); Shen Guojun (CEO)
- Parent: Alibaba Group
- Website: www.cainiao.com

Cainiao Smart Logistics Network Limited (Chinese: 菜鸟网络科技有限公司), formerly known as China Smart Logistics Network, is a Chinese logistics company launched by Alibaba Group, jointly with eight other companies, on 28 May 2013. On March 26, 2024, Alibaba, which holds approximately 64% of Cainiao's shares, said it would acquire the remaining 36% of Cainiao's shares. In September 2026, SEC filings describe Cainiao Smart Logistics Network Limited, or Cainiao Cayman as indirectly wholly owned by Alibaba Group Holding Limited, which indicates that there probably has been full ownership rather than just a controlling stake. As of May 2018, Cainiao was one of the largest unicorn companies in China, valued at 100 billion yuan.

Cainiao ensures delivery within 24 hours to any region of China. The company also shares resources with other logistics companies.

== Etymology ==
The name Cainiao combines the Chinese words 菜; cài; literally:; 'legume' and 鸟; niǎo; literally:; 'bird', as part of a metaphor meaning "the bird that only eats legumes." An animal like this would be considered weak, clumsy, or underdeveloped (unlike a meat-eating, strong, and experienced bird of prey). Thus, "Càiniǎo" could be translated as an inexperienced, novice, or beginner entity, which in the Chinese context has a positive connotation of humility and willingness to learn.

== Services ==
=== Cainiao Station ===
Cainiao operates a network of courier pick-up points known as Cainiao Stations (菜鸟驿站) across mainland China. These stations are strategically situated in residential neighborhoods and on university campuses, serving functions akin to traditional post offices. When a courier package is destined for a location within a Cainiao Station's service area, it is rerouted to the station and stored there. Recipients are notified to collect their packages, which are organized on numerical shelves and assigned a unique 4-digit code as they enter the station. Customers can locate their package using this code, and after finding it, they scan it at a self-service checkout machine to complete the pickup. Additionally, some Cainiao Stations provide services for sending packages.

=== Cainiao Express ===
Cainiao Express (菜鸟速递) is a courier service. Customers can ship packages and documents by requesting a pickup through the Cainiao app. Cainiao can also be used as one of the shipping methods when selling items on Xianyu, a classified ads and online shopping app for used goods. Cainiao also provides return shipping for items bought on Taobao.
