= 2011 Garbuzovo Antonov An-148 crash =

Aviation accident in Russia

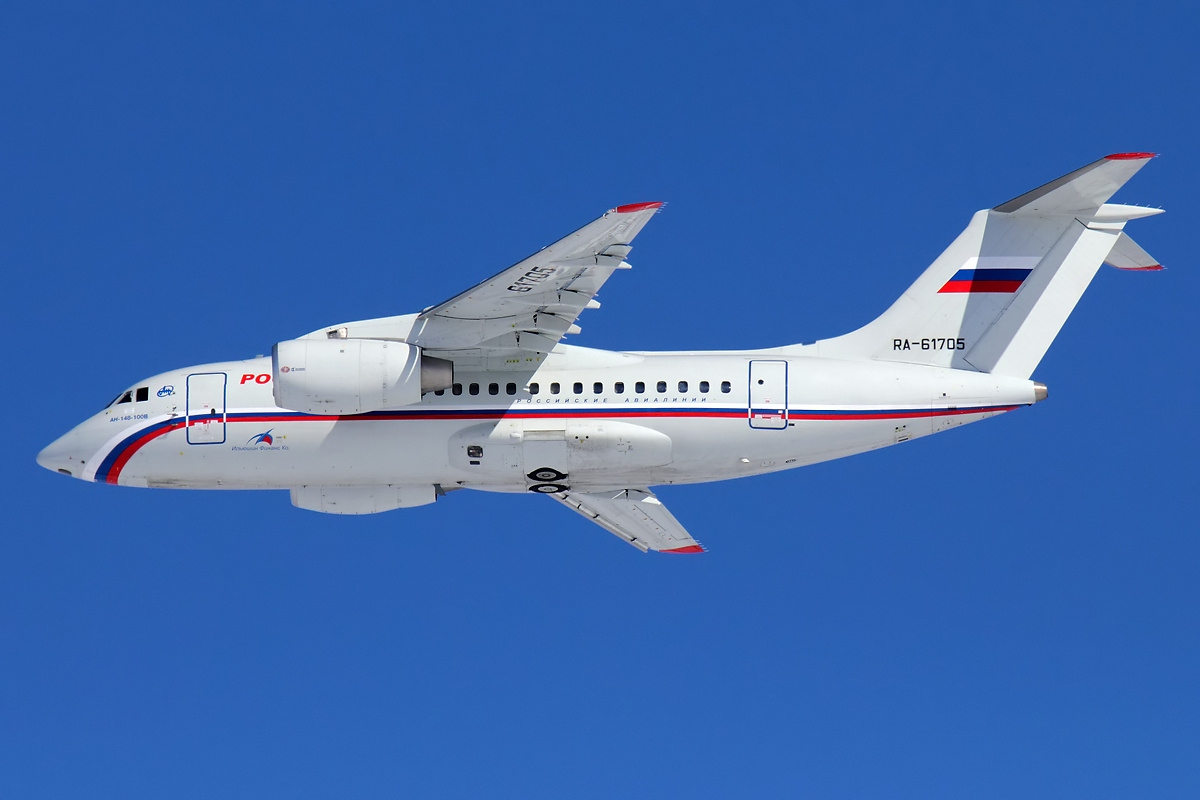
- An Antonov An-148 similar to the accident aircraft

Accident
- Date: 5 March 2011
- Summary: In-flight structural failure
- Site: Garbuzovo, Alexeyevsky Region, Belgorod Oblast, Russia; 50°28′23″N 38°44′35″E

Aircraft
- Aircraft type: Antonov An-148-100E
- Operator: Antonov/VASO
- Registration: 61708
- Flight origin: Pridacha Airport, Voronezh, Russia
- Destination: Pridacha Airport, Voronezh, Russia
- Occupants: 6
- Crew: 6
- Fatalities: 6
- Survivors: 0

On 5 March 2011, an Antonov An-148 passenger jet broke up in mid-air and crashed on the outskirts of Garbuzovo, a village in the Belgorod Oblast of Russia. All six crew members, the only people on board, were killed. The aircraft was on a demonstration flight prior to delivery to the Myanmar Air Force. The subsequent investigation concluded that the aircraft broke up after the crew allowed it to substantially exceed its maximum design speed during a practice emergency descent.

== Accident ==
The An-148 was on a local demonstration flight from Pridacha Airport in Voronezh, Russia, where it had been built by aircraft manufacturer VASO. The aircraft was being readied for delivery to the Myanmar Air Force, two representatives of which were on board. The other four crew, all Russians, were two pilots and two engineers.

At 10:40 Moscow time, the aircraft crashed at Garbuzovo, a small village in the Alexeevsky Region of the Belgorod Oblast, some 560 kilometres (350 mi) south of Moscow, narrowly missing some houses.

The wreckage was found strewn along a 3-kilometre-long (2 mi) track, after witnesses on the ground reported seeing parts of the airframe breaking off before impact. None of the six people on board survived.

== Aircraft ==
The aircraft involved was a twinjet Antonov An-148-100E, c/n 41-03, carrying test registration 61708. It was operating its 32nd flight, in preparation for delivery to the Myanmar air force. Just days before the accident, the type had been granted extended certification.

== Investigation ==
The Russian Ministry of Industry opened an investigation into the accident. A criminal investigation was launched by the Investigative Committee of Russia to decide whether violation of flight regulations occurred. The flight recorders were recovered and the entirety of the wreckage was transported to the VASO plant for further examination.

The investigation was completed in April 2011, and concluded that the crew inadvertently permitted the aircraft to accelerate over 110 km/h (59 kn; 68 mph) above its maximum design speed, or never exceed speed (V_{NE}), during an emergency descent. The abnormal aerodynamic stress exceeded the strength of the airframe, inducing low-frequency oscillations that eventually resulted in structural failure and in-flight break-up. Contributing factors were lack of proper crew coordination in executing the emergency descent, deviations from recommended procedures and the misleading indications provided by basic flight instruments while outside normal operating conditions.
