= AirBridgeCargo =

Russian cargo airline

AirBridgeCargo Airlines "Авиакомпания "ЭйрБриджКарго"

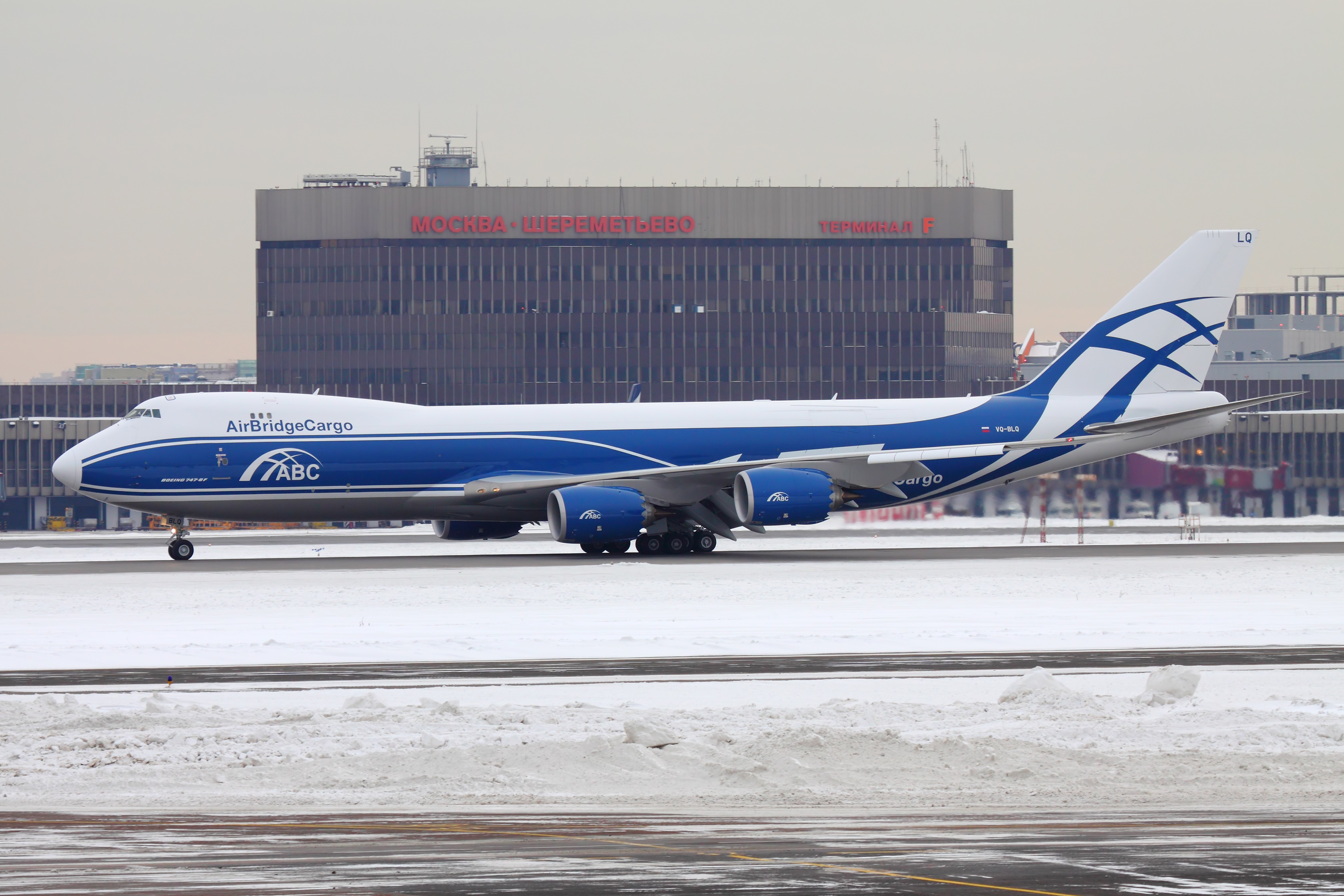
- AirBridgeCargo Boeing 747-8F
IATA	ICAO	Call sign
RU	ABW	AIRBRIDGECARGO
- Founded: 2003; 23 years ago
- Ceased operations: March 2022 (suspended)
- Hubs: Moscow: Sheremetyevo International Airport; Krasnoyarsk International Airport
- Focus cities: Moscow
- Fleet size: —
- Destinations: 37
- Parent company: Volga-Dnepr Group
- Headquarters: Moscow, Russia
- Key people: Savva Shelkovoy
- Employees: more than 1300
- Website: airbridgecargo.com

AirBridgeCargo Airlines, LLC (Russian: ООО Авиакомпания «ЭйрБриджКарго»), part of Volga-Dnepr Group, was the largest Russian cargo airline, with its head office in Moscow. It operated scheduled cargo services on routes between Russia, Asia, Europe and North America, covering more than 30 destinations worldwide. All flights connected to their hub at Sheremetyevo International Airport in Moscow and Krasnoyarsk. It was forced to suspend all operations in the wake of sanctions against Russia as of March 2022.

== History ==
The company entered the scheduled cargo market on 1 April 2004, when the first AirBridgeCargo branded Boeing 747 made its inaugural commercial flight on route from Beijing to Luxembourg.

As of March 2022, AirBridgeCargo was forced to suspend all operations due to sanctions against Russia which rendered the entire fleet unusable. In July 2022, the airline announced it would comply with sanctions and prepare to return 14 leased aircraft - which made up the majority of its fleet - to its lessors.

In March 2023, it became known that the company planned to resume flights using Ilyushin Il-96 aircraft. Volga-Dnepr had begun searching for pilots with appropriate training. However, by late 2023 these plans were abandoned, with two Il-96 formerly stored and already prepared for AirBridgeCargo being delivered to Sky Gates Airlines instead.

== Destinations ==
Prior to the suspension of all services, ABC had been present in Asia, Europe and North America. It operates a scheduled freighter route network of 37 destinations as of November 2019, focused on Europe, Asia and the United States.

Country	City	Airport	Notes
Belgium	Liège	Liège Airport	Terminated
China	Beijing	Beijing Capital International Airport	Suspended
China	Shanghai	Shanghai Pudong International Airport	Terminated
China	Shenzhen	Shenzhen Bao'an International Airport	Terminated
China	Zhengzhou	Zhengzhou Xinzheng International Airport	Suspended
Germany	Frankfurt	Frankfurt Airport	Terminated
Germany	Leipzig	Leipzig/Halle Airport	Terminated
Hong Kong	Chek Lap Kok	Hong Kong International Airport	Suspended
India	Mumbai	Chhatrapati Shivaji Maharaj International Airport	Terminated
Indonesia	Jakarta	Soekarno–Hatta International Airport	Terminated
Italy	Milan	Milan Malpensa Airport	Terminated
Japan	Tokyo	Narita International Airport	Terminated
Kazakhstan	Karaganda	Sary-Arka Airport	Terminated
Netherlands	Amsterdam	Amsterdam Airport Schiphol	Terminated
Norway	Oslo	Oslo Airport	Terminated
Russia	Ekaterinburg	Koltsovo International Airport	Terminated
Russia	Kazan	Kazan International Airport	Terminated
Russia	Krasnoyarsk	Krasnoyarsk International Airport	Hub
Russia	Moscow	Moscow Domodedovo Airport	Terminated
Russia	Moscow	Sheremetyevo International Airport	Hub
Singapore	Singapore	Changi Airport	Terminated
South Korea	Seoul	Incheon International Airport	Terminated
Spain	Madrid	Adolfo Suárez Madrid–Barajas Airport	Terminated
Spain	Zaragoza	Zaragoza Airport	Terminated
Thailand	Bangkok	Suvarnabhumi Airport	Suspended
Turkey	Istanbul	Istanbul Airport	Terminated
United Arab Emirates	Dubai	Dubai International Airport	Terminated
United Kingdom	London	Heathrow Airport	Terminated
United States	Anchorage	Ted Stevens Anchorage International Airport	Terminated
United States	Atlanta	Hartsfield–Jackson Atlanta International Airport	Terminated
United States	Chicago	O'Hare International Airport	Suspended

== Fleet ==
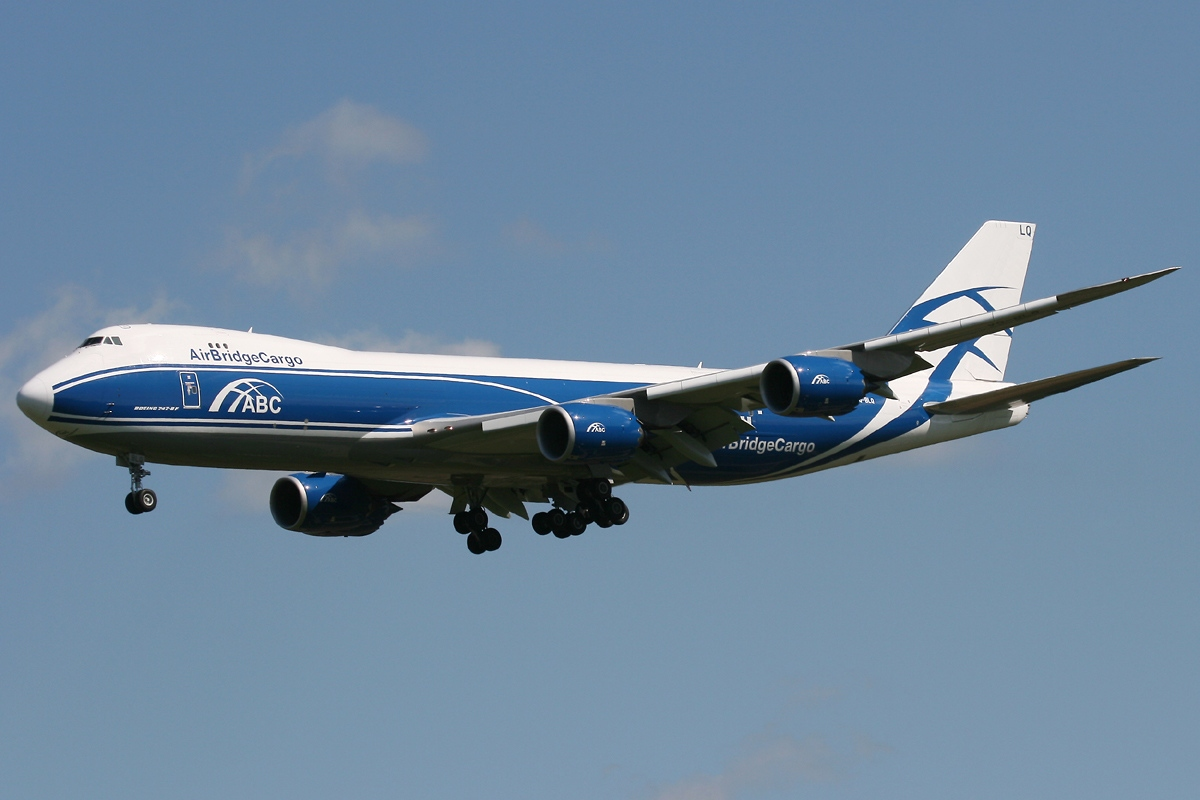
A former AirBridgeCargo Boeing 747-8F, which was returned to its lessor. Some other AirBridgeCargo's 747-8F are simply stored in Russia.

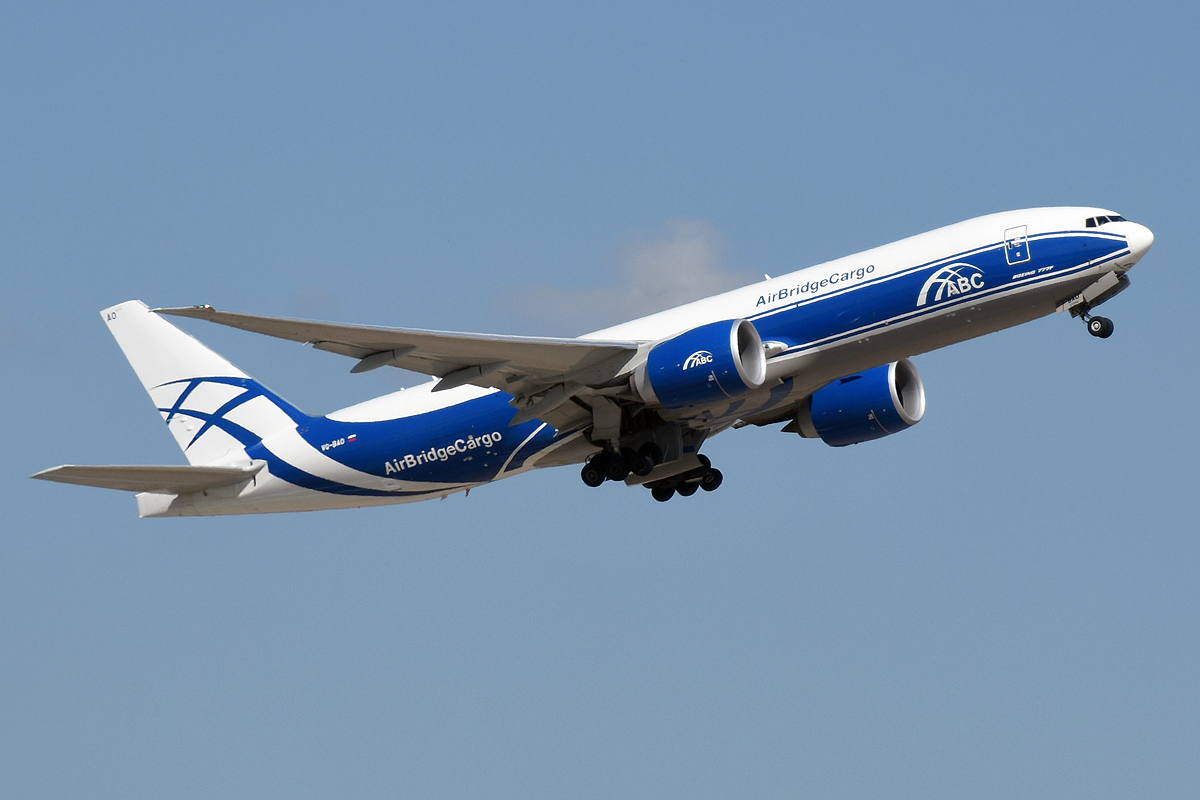
The sole Boeing 777F that AirBridgeCargo briefly operated before the cessation of operations

As of March 2024, AirBridgeCargo currently no longer operates any aircraft after returning their fleet to its lessors. AirBridgeCargo formerly operated the following aircraft:

AirBridgeCargo former fleet
Aircraft	Total	Introduced	Retired	Notes
Boeing 737-400SF	1	2015	2017	
Boeing 747-200F	5	2004	2012	
Boeing 747-300SF	1	2005	2012	
Boeing 747-400F	12	2007	2022	
Boeing 747-8F	13	2010	2024	
Boeing 777F	1	2020	2022	

== Accidents and incidents ==
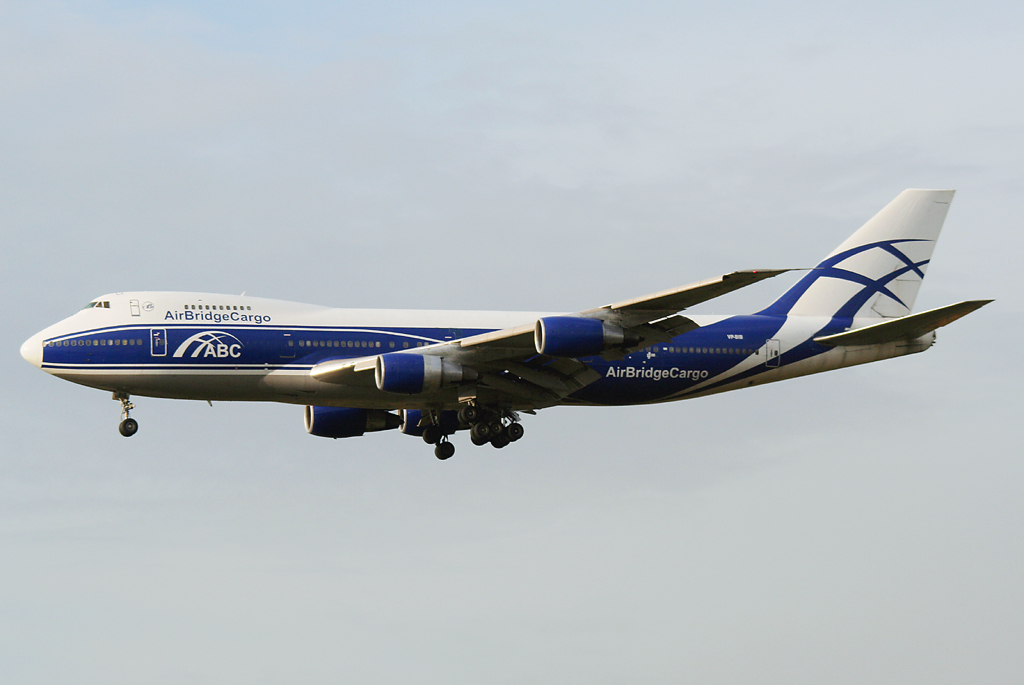
A former AirBridgeCargo Boeing 747-200F which has been retired

- On September 11, 2012, an AirBridgeCargo Boeing 747-8F experienced a major engine malfunction that spread a significant amount of metallic debris on the runway. Like in a similar event during pre-flight taxi tests, the low pressure turbine shaft separated and moved the low pressure turbine (by design to avoid turbine overspeed) backwards braking on surrounding hardware.
- On July 31, 2013, an AirBridgeCargo Boeing 747-8F experienced core engine icing that caused engine malfunctions and damage to three engines near Chengdu, China, while en route to Hong Kong; the aircraft landed safely at its destination. Boeing and General Electric would later work on software changes to mitigate the effects of core engine icing.
