= Russian presidential aircraft =

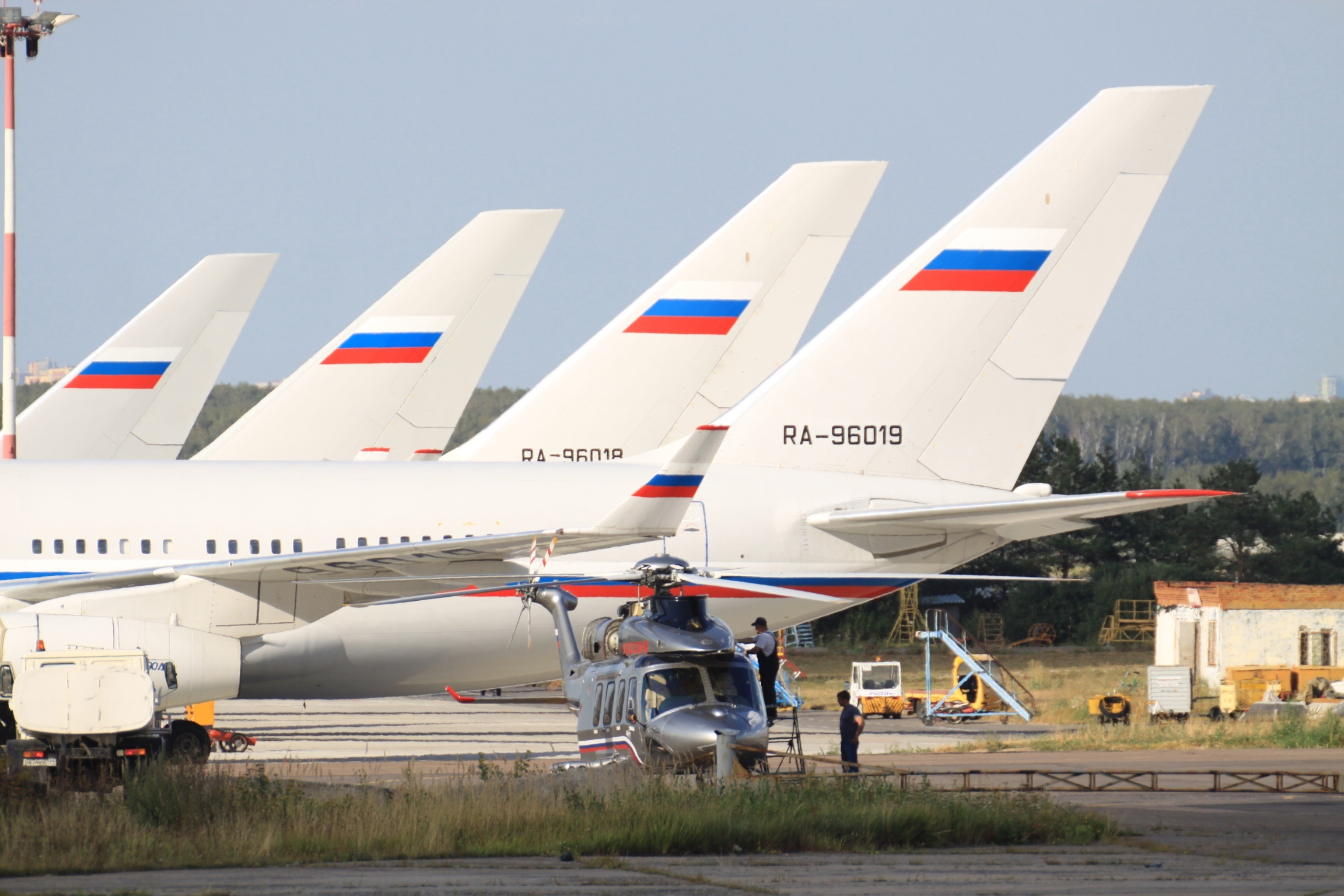
Rossiya's fleet of Ilyushin Il-96 widebody jetliners.

The Russian presidential aircraft are aircraft of the Russian presidential fleet used by the president of Russia and other government officials. The presidential fleet is operated by the Special Air Squadron, or Special Air Detachment, part of the Directorate of the President of the Russian Federation. The main presidential aircraft is the four-engined, long-range, widebody Ilyushin Il-96-300PU, a highly modified Il-96, with the two last letters standing for "Command Point" in Russian. The presidential fleet of planes also includes Ilyushin Il-62, Tupolev Tu-154, and Sukhoi Superjet 100 aircraft, among others.

== History ==
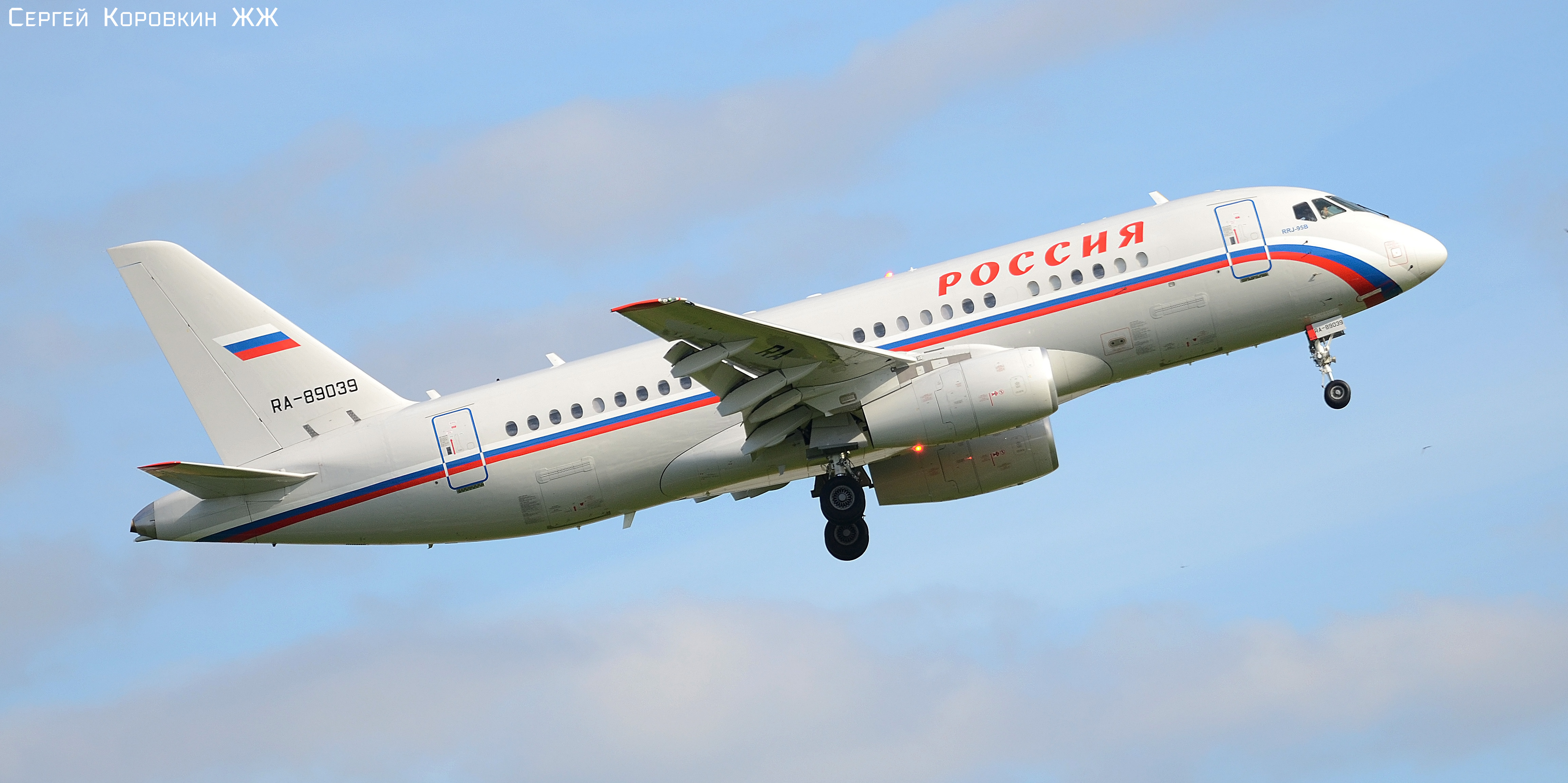
A Sukhoi Superjet 100 operated by the Special Air Squadron.

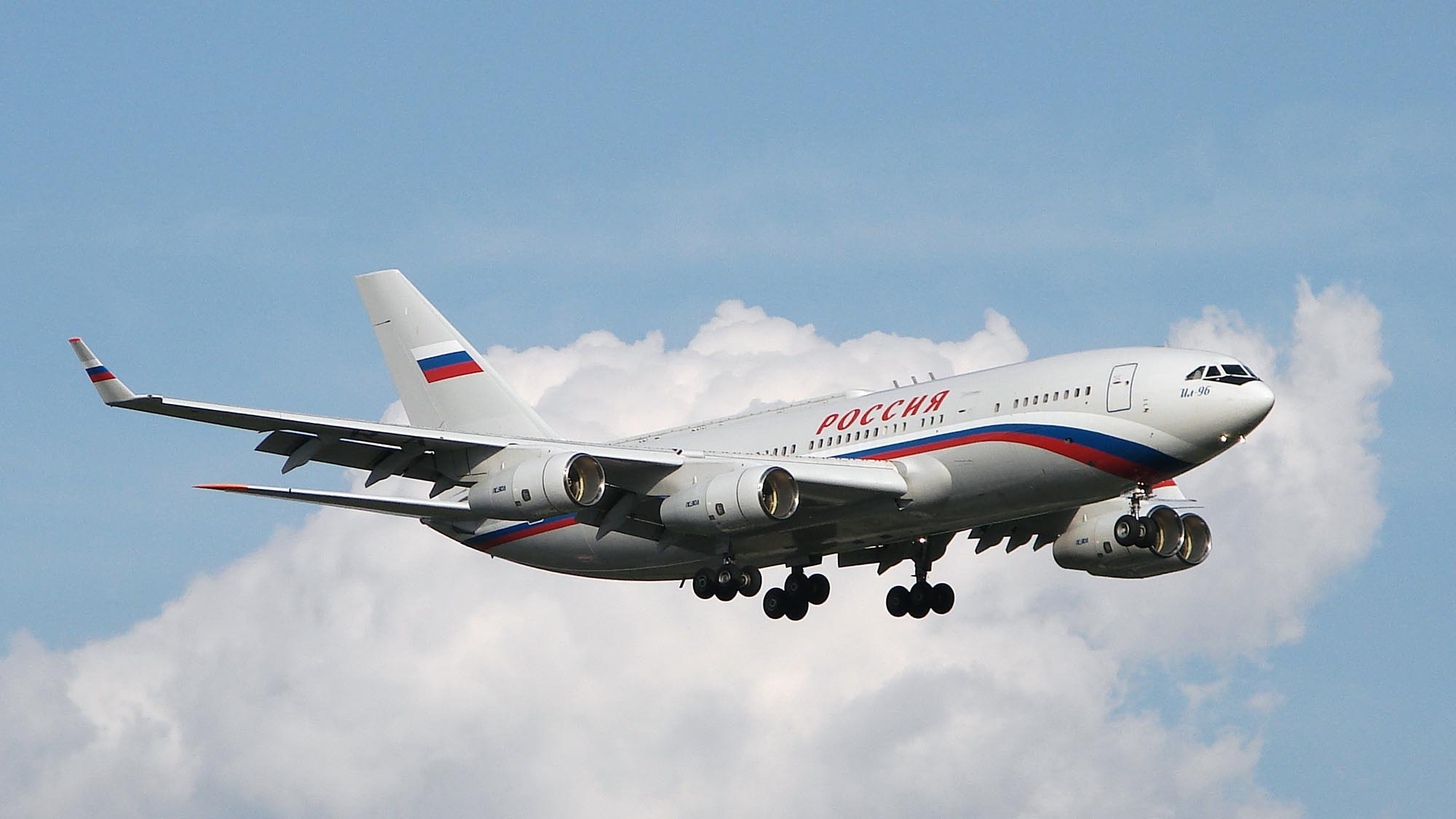
An Ilyushin Il-96-300PU operated by the Special Air Squadron.

Five modified Il-96s have been used as presidential aircraft, the first one was used by the first president of Russia, Boris Yeltsin. In 2005, the second PUM aircraft was used by President Vladimir Putin. In 2010, the third president, Dmitry Medvedev, announced that he wanted to expand the presidential fleet with two more PUM1 aircraft, manufactured by the Voronezh Aircraft Plant. The aircraft were delivered in 2012 and 2014. One more PUM1 (registration number RA-96022) was delivered in July 2016.

In May 2010, it was reported that the first new Russian airliner, the Sukhoi Superjet 100, could be used as the Russian presidential airplane in the future.

== Description ==
The aircraft is a highly customized version of the standard Il-96, with extensive modifications for luxury and safety, including advanced communications systems and laser anti-missile protection. The presidential aircraft formerly used the same color scheme as standard Rossiya aircraft, until Rossiya changed its mainline colors in April 2016. The presidential aircraft uses the coat of arms of Russia or the Presidential Standard on the empennage instead of the standard flag of Russia, and its interiors are inspired by Russian art.

== See also ==
- Air transports of heads of state and government
