= Ilyushin Il-80 =

Russian airborne command post aircraft based on Il-86 airliner

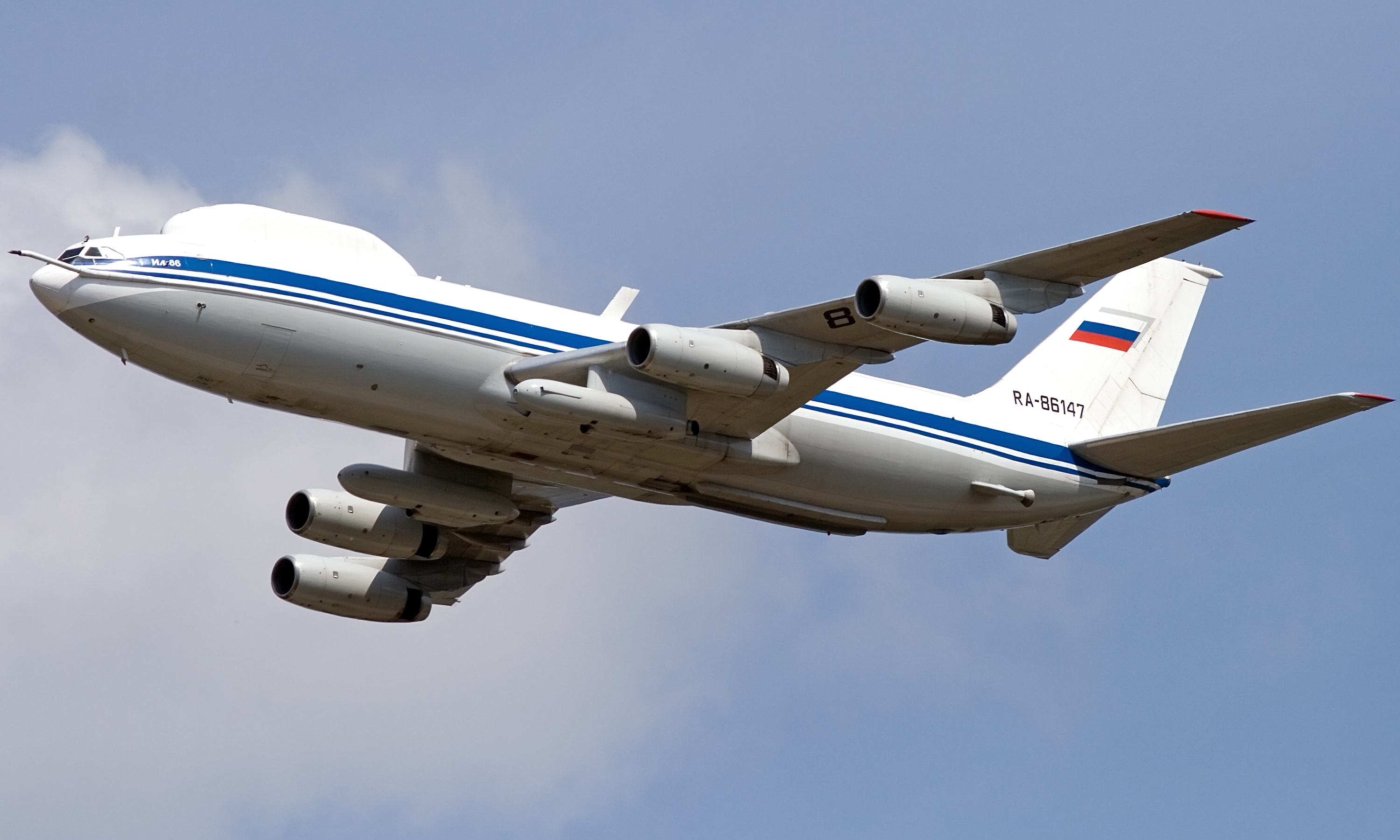
- Ilyushin Il-80 flying over Moscow on 6 May 2010

General information
- Type: Airborne command post
- Manufacturer: Ilyushin
- Status: In service
- Primary user: Russian Aerospace Forces
- Number built: 4

History
- Introduction date: 1992
- First flight: 5 March 1987
- Developed from: Ilyushin Il-86

The Ilyushin Il-80 (NATO reporting name: Maxdome) is a Russian airborne command and control aircraft modified from the Ilyushin Il-86 airliner.

== Development ==
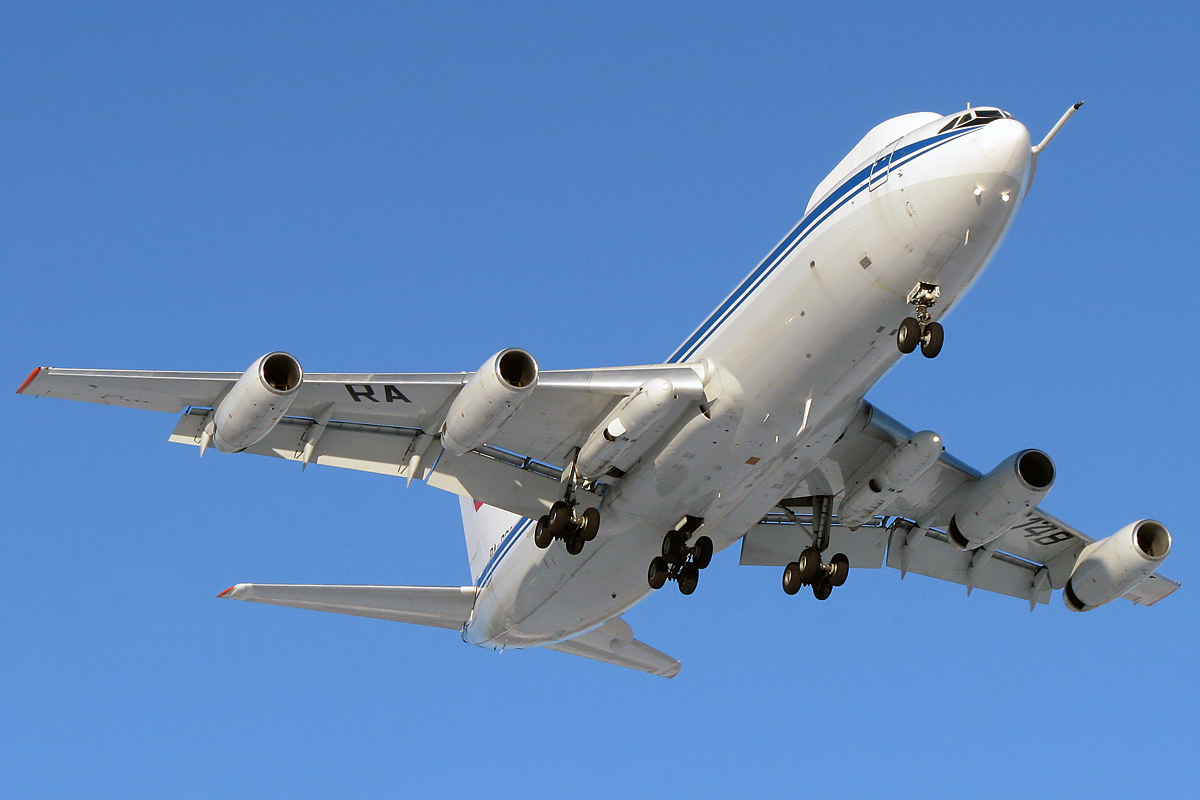
Aerial refueling Probe-and-drogue system visible at the forward left side of fuselage

The Ilyushin Il-80 has the NATO reporting name Maxdome (though some sources claim it uses the reporting name Camber, like the Il-86 passenger jet). The Russian reporting name for the aircraft is Aimak, or Eimak (Mongolian for "clan"). The aircraft is believed to have first flown in the summer of 1985 from Pridacha Airport in Voronezh, with the first post-modification flight taking place on March 5, 1987, and deliveries starting later that year. In all, four aircraft are known to have been converted from Il-86s. They were registered CCCP-86146 through 86149, and were first observed by western photographers in 1992.

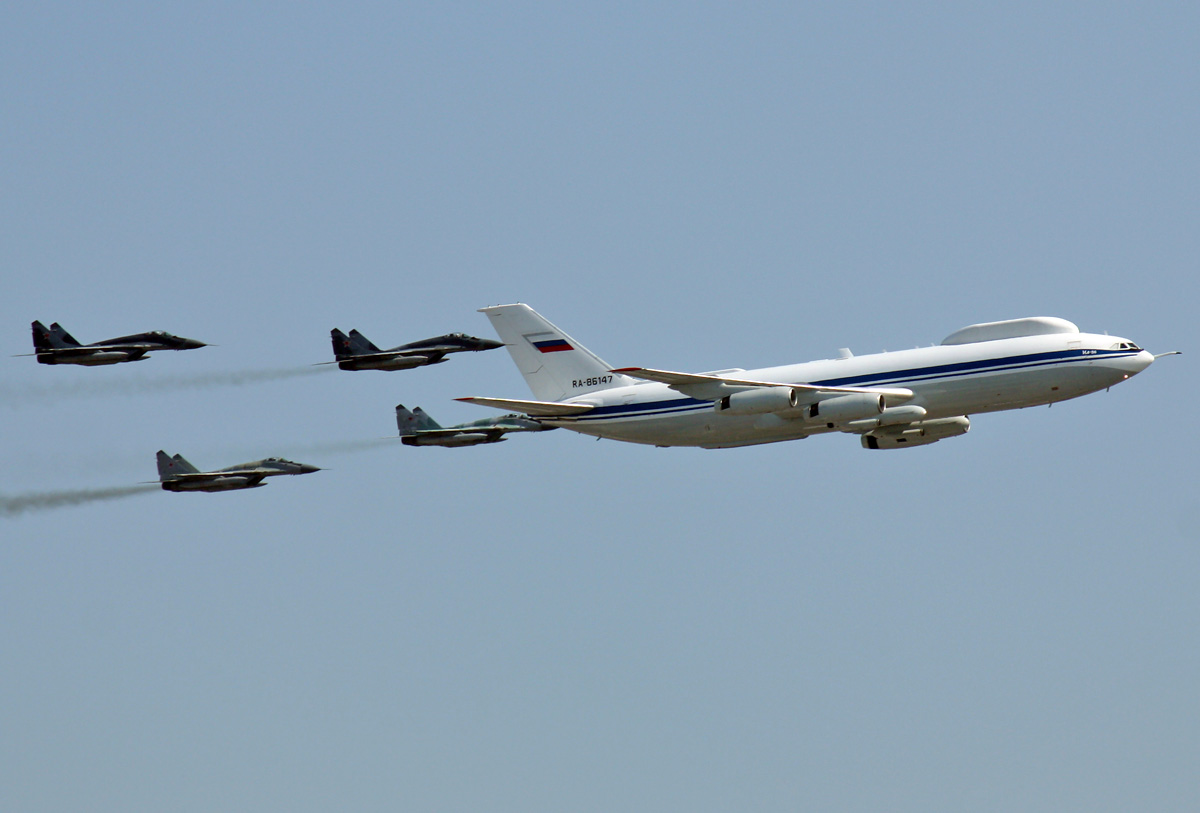
Il-80 being escorted by a number of Mikoyan MiG-29 in a 2010 event.

Heavily modified from the Ilyushin Il-86 which all aircraft are former retired Aeroflot Il-86, the Il-80 (also referred to as the Il-86VKP) is meant to be used as an airborne command center for Russian officials, including the President, in the event of nuclear war. The role of the Ilyushin Il-80 is similar to that of the Boeing E-4B. The Il-80 has no external windows (save those in the cockpit), to shield it from a nuclear blast and nuclear electromagnetic pulse. Only the upper deck forward door on the left and the aft door on the right remain from the standard design. There is only one airstair door, instead of three. An unusual baffle blocks the aft cockpit windows. This may serve to block EMP or RF pulses.

Unlike the standard Il-86 airliner, the Il-80 has two electrical generator pods mounted inboard of the engine nacelles. Each pod is approximately 9.5 metres (32 feet) long and 1.3 metres (4 feet) in diameter. Both pods include landing lights.

Like the E-4B, the aircraft has a dorsal SATCOM canoe, believed to house advanced satellite communications equipment, and a trailing wire antenna mounted in the lower aft fuselage for very low frequency (VLF) radio transmission and reception (likely for communication with ballistic missile submarines).

== Replacement ==
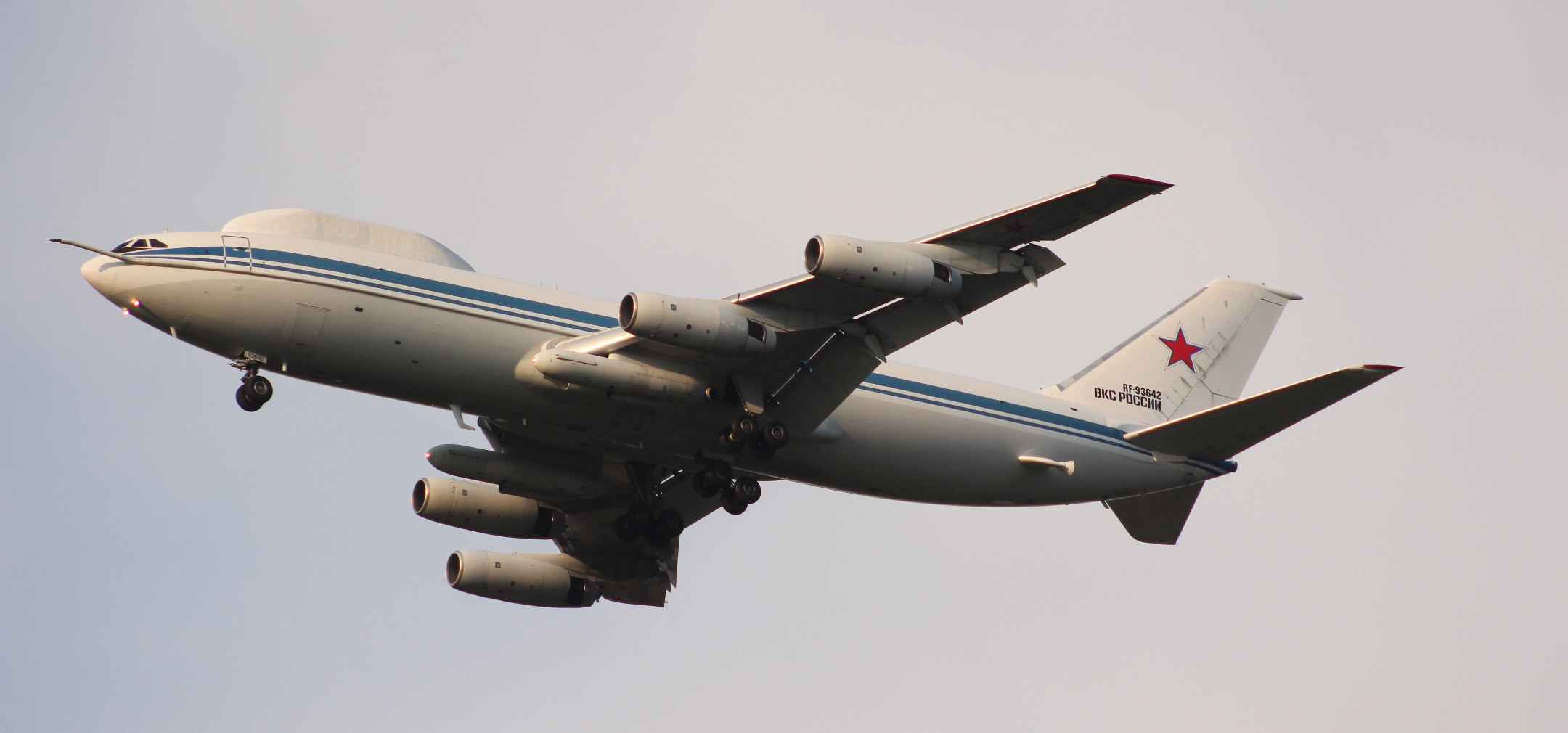
An Il-80 flying near Chkalovsky in 2025.

When the present upgrades have reached the end of their life, it is expected that a new airborne command post, based on the Ilyushin Il-96-400M commercial aircraft and delivered as the so-called Doomsday plane, will replace them.

== Operation ==
Upon completion, all four Il-80s were delivered to the 8th Special Purposes Aviation Division at the Chkalovsky Airbase near Moscow.

As of 2011 three Il-80s remain in service. They are painted in the classic livery of Aeroflot, the Russian state airline; and carry international civilian registrations RA-86147, RA-86148, and RA-86149. The first Il-80, registration RA-86146, has been photographed without engines and is apparently out of service. As of 2011 the Il-80s remain based at Chkalovsky Airbase, located 30 km (19 mi) northeast of Moscow. The aircraft are rarely observed in operation, though at least one was seen at an air show.

In December 2020, Russian media reported that radio communication equipment had been stolen from one of the Il-80s while it was undergoing maintenance.

== Operators ==
Russia

- Russian Aerospace Forces, 1338 test centre, Chkalovsky Airport

== Similar aircraft ==
- Boeing E-4
- Northrop Grumman E-8 Joint STARS
- TACAMO
- Tu-214PU

== See also ==
- Doomsday plane
