= Doomsday plane (Russia) =

Russian Airborne Command Post

The Doomsday plane is a planned Airborne Command Post to be operated by the Russian Air Force. It is based on the Ilyushin Il-96-400-M commercial aircraft airframe and is scheduled to replace the older Ilyushin Il-80 models introduced in the early 1990s.

The production of the aircraft was delayed multiple times and is now scheduled to be started in 2024.

A Tupolev Tu-214PU, that falls in the category of a Doomsday plane, was tracked taking off from Moscow, and landing in Tehran around July 13, 2026 . The "PU" designation stands for Punkt Upravleniya, or "Flying Command Post", and is most likely a hardened, longer range version of the 214. A typical Doomsday plane would be security hardened, with encrypted communications, and anti-jamming technology which allows senior political, and military officials to coordinate operations during national emergencies.

== Aircraft of comparable role, configuration and/or era ==
- Boeing E-4
- Boeing E-6 Mercury
- Northrop Grumman E-10 MC2A
- Ilyushin Il-80

== See also ==
- Doomsday plane
- Dead Hand (nuclear war)
