= Volga-Dnepr Group =

Russian holding company for several air cargo businesses

- Industry: Aviation
- Founded: 1990
- Headquarters: Moscow, Russia
- Services: Charter Cargo; Scheduled Cargo; Aircraft Maintenance
- Revenue: US$ 1.45 billion (2015)
- Operating income: US$ 238.8 million (2015)
- Number of employees: 3,500 (2019)
- Website: volga-dnepr.com

Volga-Dnepr Group is a Russian airline holding company headquartered in Moscow. It is a world leader in the global market for the movement of oversize, unique and heavy air cargo. The group’s core business activities are charter cargo operations using Antonov An-124 and IL-76TD-90VD heavy transporters and scheduled cargo operations using Boeing 747 and Boeing 737 freighters.

In January 2026, it was announced that the Volga-Dnepr Group had been acquired by Evraz Avia Service LLC, a newly established company owned by former aviation executive Evgeny Solodilin. Under the transaction, Evraz Avia Service obtained full control of AirBridgeCargo and Volga-Dnepr-Moscow and a majority stake in Atran, although the ownership structure remains subject to share pledges in favour of former owners, who continue to hold management positions.

== Subsidiaries ==
- AirBridgeCargo
- ATRAN Airlines
- Volga-Dnepr Airlines

Volga-Dnepr Airlines is the main subsidiary of the group, which operates a fleet of twelve Antonov An-124 and five Ilyushin IL-76, for international charter services of oversized and heavy cargo. AirBridgeCargo is one of the largest carriers in the international scheduled cargo market. It operates scheduled cargo operations using the fleet of Boeing 747-400 and Boeing 747-8F. ATRAN Airlines, originally established in 1942 became a subsidiary of Volga-Dnepr in 2011. ATRAN operates Boeing 737's from Vnukovo and Sheremetyevo airports in Moscow, for short and medium-haul flights.

== Group Fleet ==
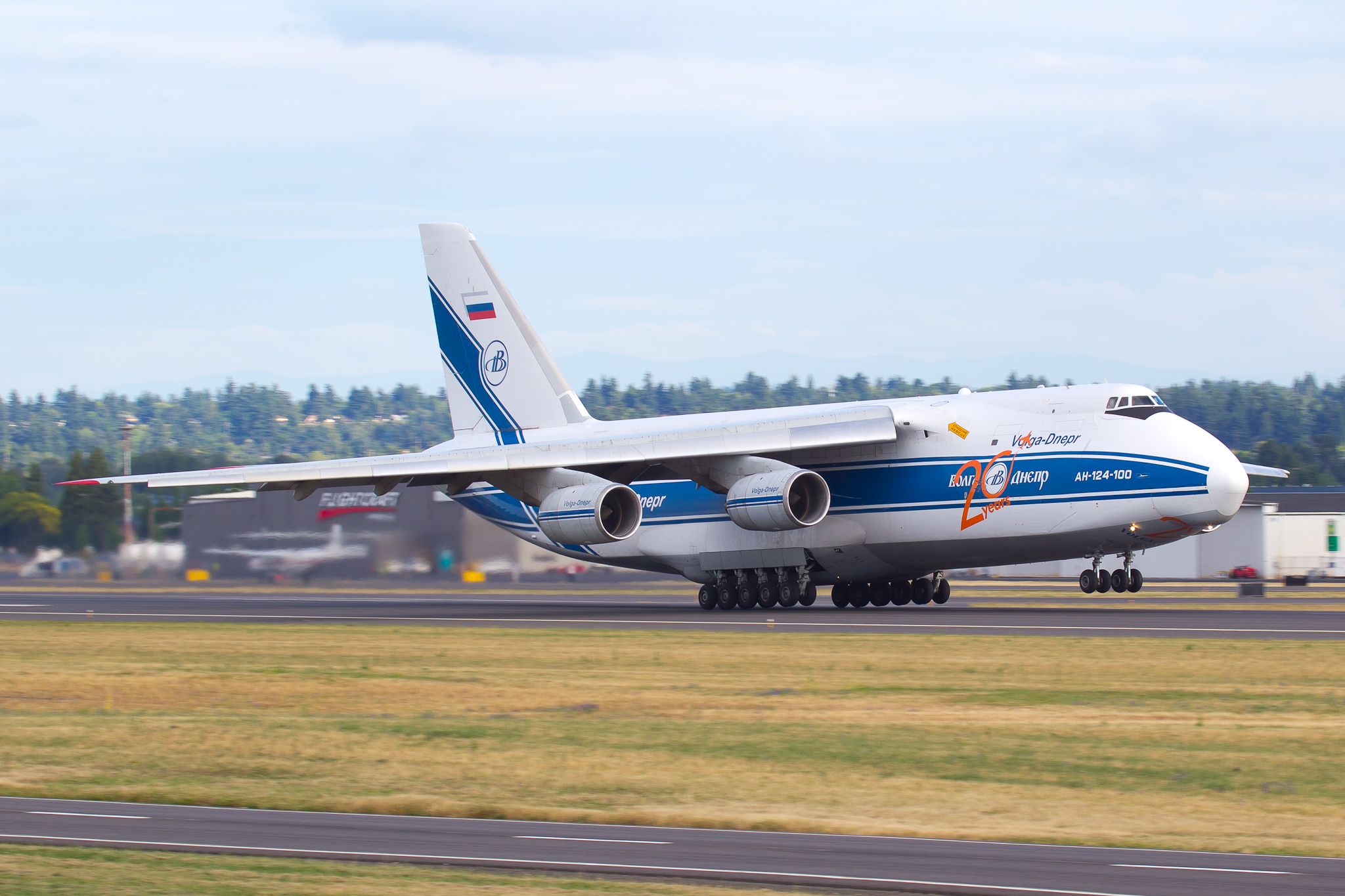
An Antonov An-124 of Volga-Dnepr Airlines.

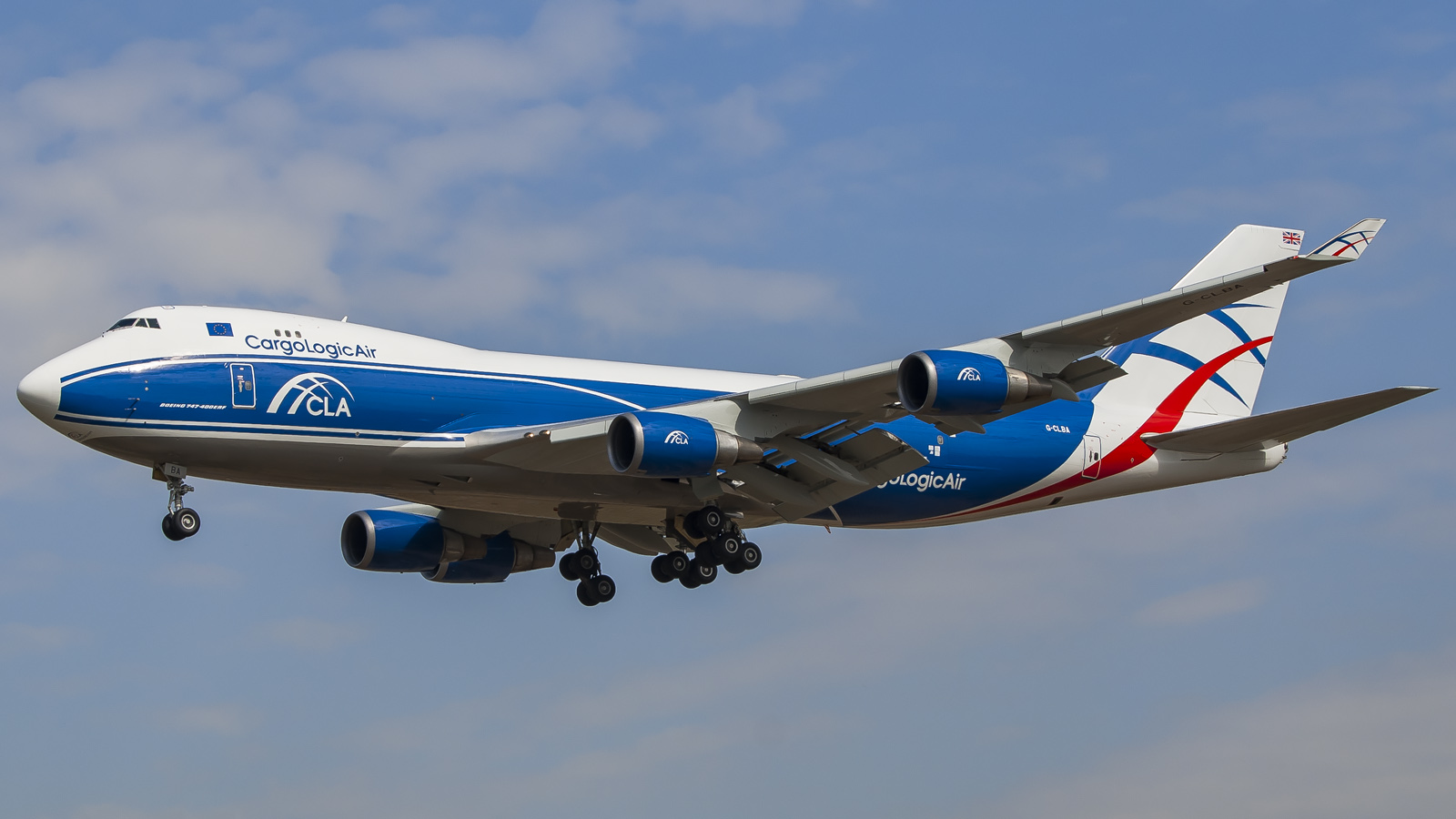
A Boeing 747-400ERF of CargoLogicAir.

As of June 2020 the Volga-Dnepr Group fleet consists of the following aircraft;

Volga-Dnepr Group fleet
Aircraft	In service	Orders	Notes
Antonov An-124	12	3	Operated by Volga-Dnepr Airlines.
Boeing 737-400SF	6	—	Operated by ATRAN (3)
Boeing 737-800BCF	2	—	Operated by ATRAN.
Boeing 747-400F	1	—	
Boeing 747-400ERF	5	—	Operated by AirBridgeCargo (4).
Boeing 747-8F	13	—	Operated by AirBridgeCargo.
Ilyushin IL-76TD-90VD	5	—	Operated by Volga-Dnepr Airlines.
Total	44	12	
