= Pridacha Airport =

Airport in Russia

- IATA: none; ICAO: UUOD

Summary
- Airport type: Testing purposes only
- Operator: VASO
- Location: Voronezh
- Elevation AMSL: 344 ft / 105 m
- Coordinates: 51°39′0″N 039°15′0″E
- Interactive map of Pridacha Airport

Runways
Direction	Length		Surface
Direction	ft	m	Surface
03/21	7,953	2,424	Asphalt

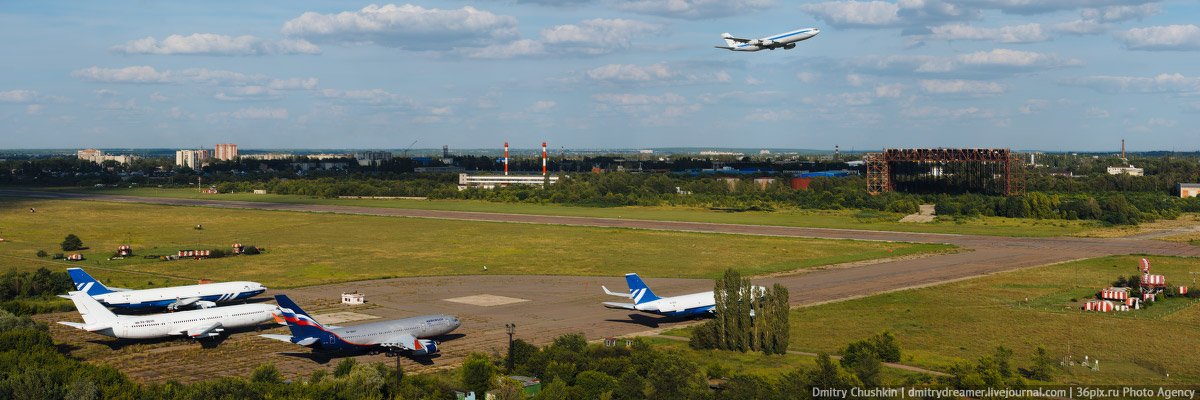

Pridacha Airport (Russian: Аэропорт Придача) (also given as Repnoe, or Voronezh East) (ICAO: UUOD) is an airport in Russia located 5 km east of Voronezh. It is home to the Voronezh Aircraft Plant (VASO). The Tupolev Tu-144, Ilyushin Il-86, and Ilyushin Il-96 were built here.

Voronezh Pridacha is not open to the public and is used solely by VASO, no public access is allowed
