= Doomsday plane =

Military command aircraft

Doomsday plane is an unofficial denomination of a class of aircraft which is used as an airborne command post in an event of nuclear war, disaster or other large scale conflict that threatens key military and government infrastructure.

The only countries known to have designed and manufactured such aircraft are the United States and the Russian Federation.

== About the planes ==
Known officially to the United States as National Airborne Operations Centers (NAOC), these planes allow leaders to issue commands and wage war from the sky. They also feature a vast array of defense mechanisms, including the ability to withstand electromagnetic pulses. The jet's crews also use traditional analog flight instruments to navigate as they are less susceptible to cyberattack. The planes, while not technically secret, are rarely mentioned; the United States Air Force, for example, will not even publicly acknowledge owning some of them. In operation since the 1970s, these airborne command posts were long considered the best chance for a Cold War president to survive a nuclear attack. Unlike the ceremonial and comfort-focused Air Force One, the doomsday planes are flying war rooms staffed by dozens of military analysts, strategists and communication aides who would help the president through the first days of a nuclear war.

== United States ==
=== Boeing E-4B ===
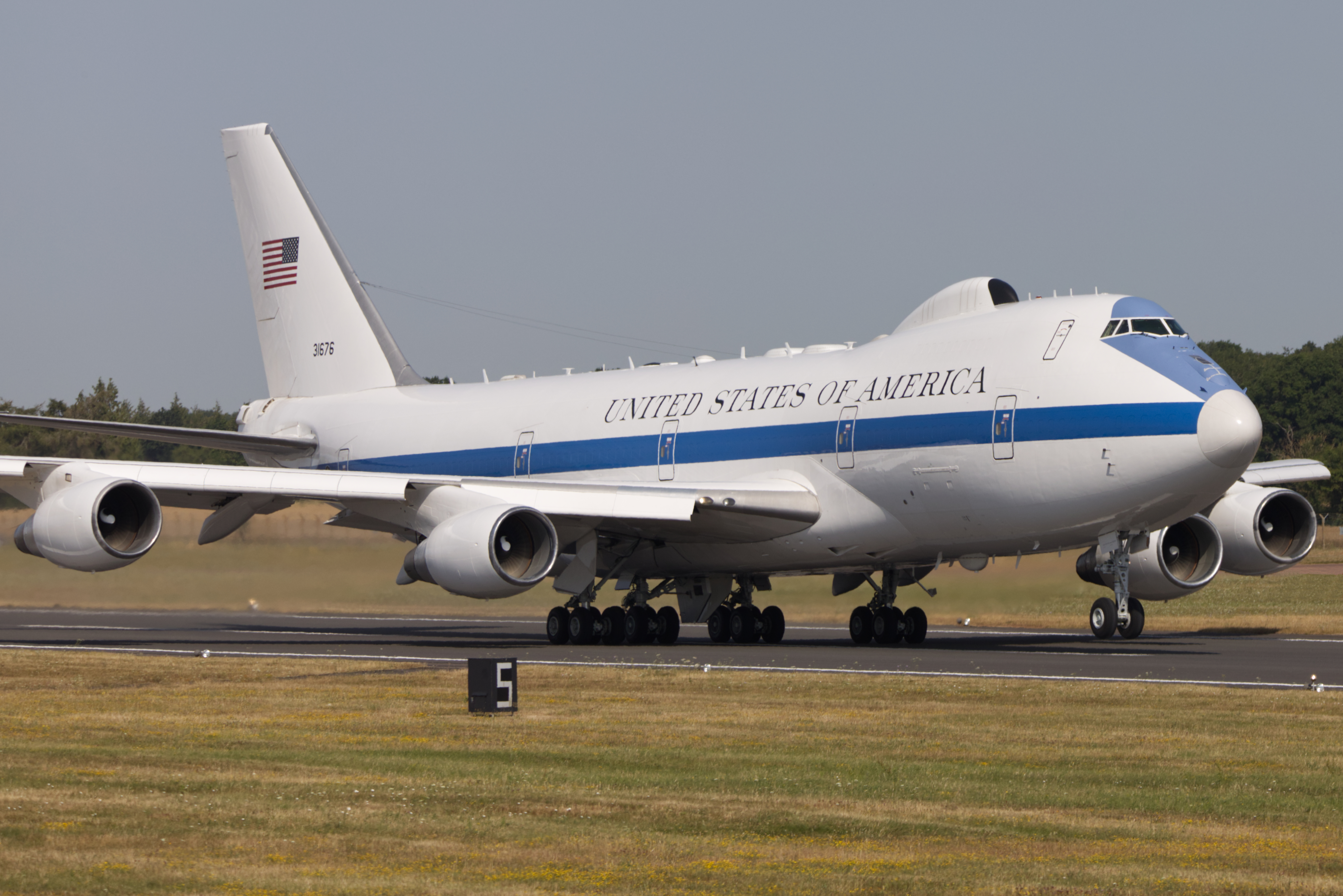
A USAF E-4B in 2022

The Boeing E-4 is an Advanced Airborne Command Post, with the project name "Nightwatch", and is a strategic command and control military aircraft operated by the United States Air Force. The E-4 series was specially modified from the Boeing 747-200B for the National Emergency Airborne Command Post (NEACP) program. The E-4 serves as a survivable mobile command post for the National Command Authority, namely the President of the United States, the Secretary of Defense, and successors.

Sierra Nevada Corporation, which has won a U.S. Air Force contract to develop a successor to the E-4B against Boeing, will have five Korean Air Boeing 747-8s delivered by 2025. Development and delivery is expected to be completed by July 2036.

=== Boeing E-6 Mercury ===
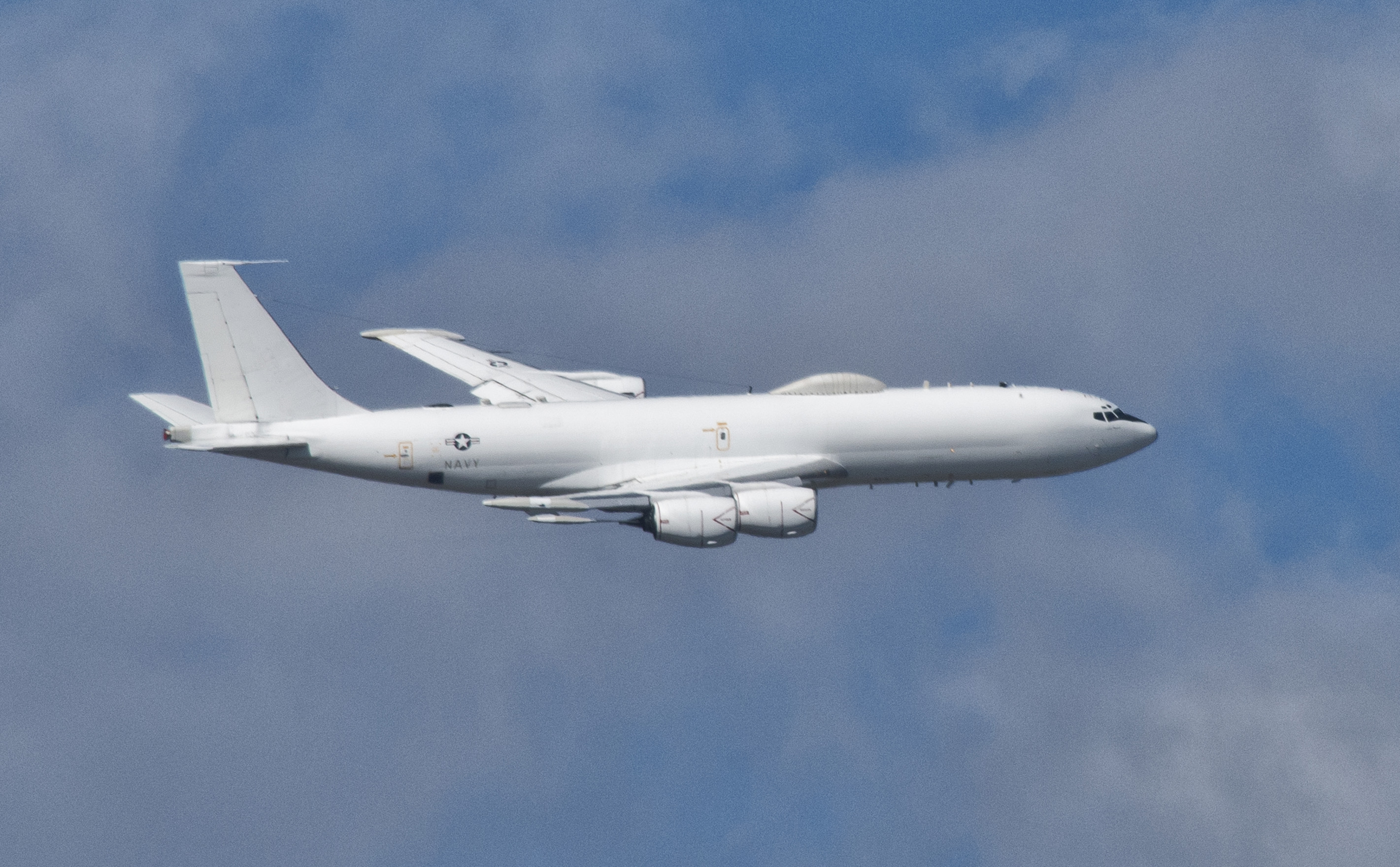
An USN E-6B in 2014

The Boeing E-6 Mercury (formerly E-6 Hermes) is an airborne command post and communications relay based on the Boeing 707-320. The original E-6A manufactured by Boeing's defense division entered service with the United States Navy in July 1989, replacing the EC-130Q. This platform, now modified to the E-6B standard, conveys instructions from the National Command Authority to fleet ballistic missile submarines, a mission known as TACAMO (Take Charge And Move Out). The E-6B model deployed in October 1998 can also remotely control Minuteman ICBMs using the Airborne Launch Control System. With production lasting until 1991, the E-6 was the final new derivative of the Boeing 707 to be built.

=== Northrop Grumman E-10 MC2A ===
The Northrop Grumman E-10 MC2A was planned as a multi-role military aircraft to replace the Boeing 707-based E-3 Sentry and E-8 Joint STARS, the Boeing 747-based E-4B, and the RC-135 Rivet Joint aircraft in US service. The E-10 was based on the Boeing 767-400ER commercial airplane. In 2003, the Northrop Grumman, Boeing, and Raytheon MC2A team was awarded a $215 million contract for pre-System Development and Demonstration for the aircraft. It would have been the central command authority for all air, land, and sea forces in a combat theater. The E-10 was also considered for use as a command center for unmanned combat air vehicles.

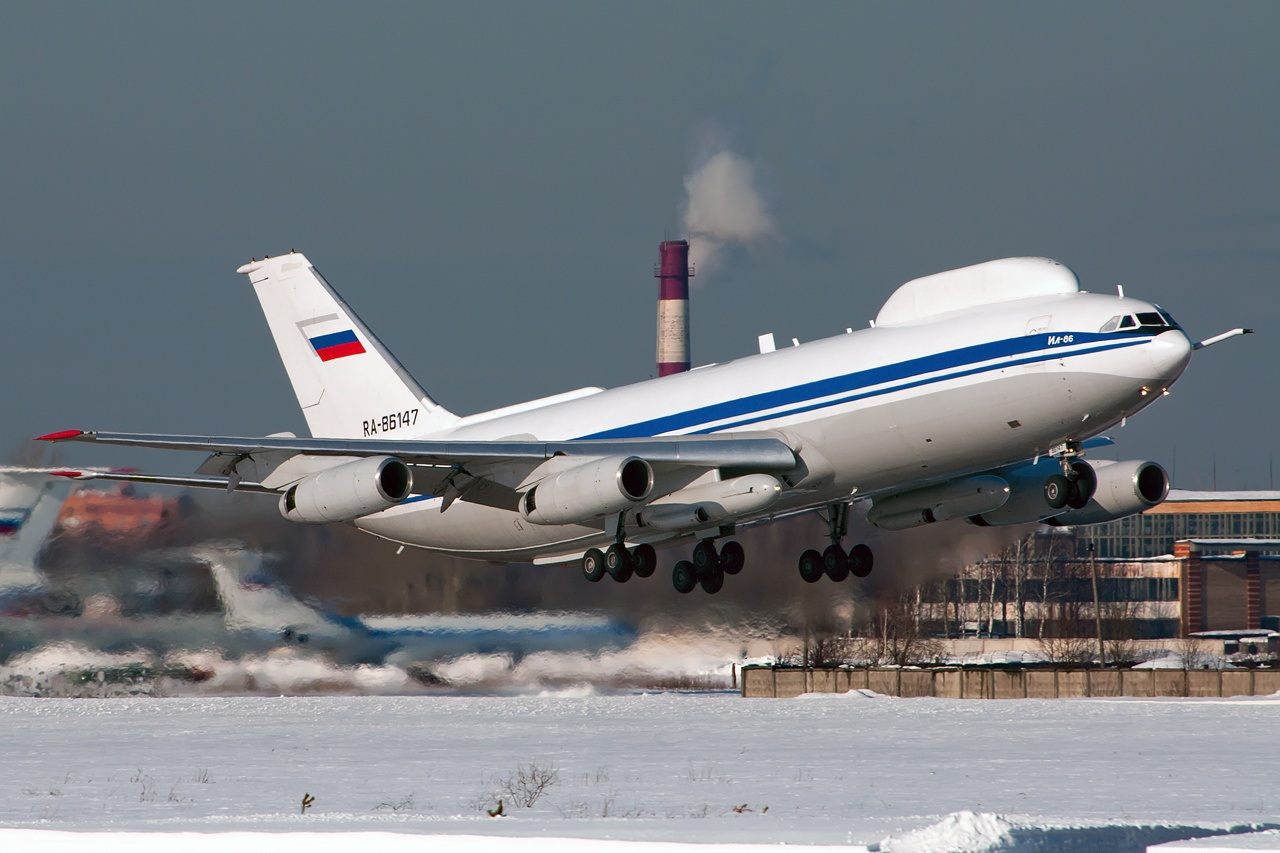
A Russian Il-80/-87 in 2012

== Russian Federation ==
- Ilyushin Il-80
- Ilyushin Il-82
- Ilyushin Il-96-400M base doomsday plane (future; to replace older Il-80 variants)

== See also ==
- Dead Hand – Cold War-era nuclear weapons control system
- Post-Attack Command and Control System – Former US nuclear communications network
