= Voronezh Aircraft Production Association =

Aircraft manufacturing plant in Voronezh, Russia

Coordinates: 51°38′N 39°15′E

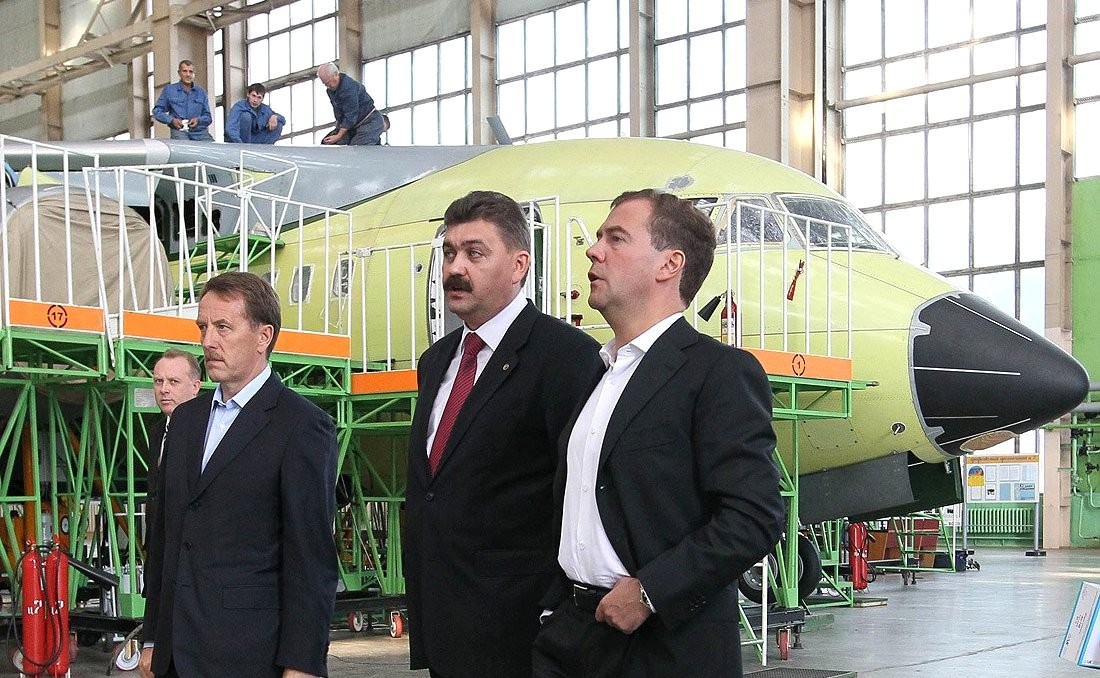
- Type: Open joint-stock company
- Industry: Aircraft
- Founded: March 1, 1932; 94 years ago in Voronezh, Soviet Union
- Headquarters: Tsiolkovsky 27, Voronezh, Russia
- Key people: General manager: Dmitry Prishvin
- Products: Airplanes
- Revenue: 6,670,500,000 Russian ruble (2017)
- Operating income: −246,391,000 Russian ruble (2017)
- Net income: −1,471,689,000 Russian ruble (2017)
- Total assets: 36,740,968,000 Russian ruble (2017)
- Number of employees: 5,853 (June 2013)
- Parent: UAC
- Website: vaso.u

Voronezh Aircraft Production Association (Note: Russian: ПАО «Воронежское акционерное самолётостроительное общество», romanized: PAO «Voronežskoje akcionernoje samoljotostroiteljnoje obšcestvo») (VASO in English, ВАСО in Russian, Воронежское акционерное самолётостроительное общество, literally Society of Voronezh Joint-Ownership Aircraft Builders) is one of the largest aircraft production plants in Russia.

== History ==
Founded in 1932 in Voronezh (as Voronezh Aviation Plant, branch registry number 18). In 2007, VASO became part of the state-owned United Aircraft Corporation (UAC). Notable planes built here are the An-148 (never was commercially built, failed), Tu-28 (until 1970), Tu-144 (16 were made in 1967-1983), Il-86 (built until the end of the USSR), Il-96 (still in production with less than 1 unit per year), Il-28 (production ended in 1970), ANT-25 (pre-WWII plane), TB-3 (WWII plane), Il-2 (WWII plane), Tu-16 (built in the middle of the 20th century, retired in the late USSR years) and some others.

In July 2009, UAC said it will invest 5 billion rubles ($162 mln) in the modernization of VASO's facilities. According to UAC, VASO will build 5 An-148 passenger aircraft in 2009, 18 in 2010, 36 in 2011, and 50 planes would be made annually from 2013 onwards.

Between 2008 and 2015, it produced some parts for an Airbus A320 and the A380.

In 1993, the aircraft plant started to develop two new updates to old Soviet models, the wide-body aircraft Il-96-400M and Il-112V. However, the yearly revenue of the plant is lower than the average price of one wide-body airliner.

== Operation ==
The plant produces IL-96-300, IL-96-400T aircraft, separate units for Il-76MD-90A, SSJ100 and MC-21 aircraft, as well as PD-14 engines; work is underway on Il-112 and Il-114 aircraft. Up to and including 2018, the An-148 aircraft was produced in cooperation with Ukraine.

Also the plant is engaged in the maintenance of IL-96 and An-148.

Test flights are conducted at the Pridacha experimental airfield.

== VASO Airlines ==
For a short period, the company operated a charter airline sub-division, naming it VASO Airlines. Established in 1999, VASO folded in 2006.

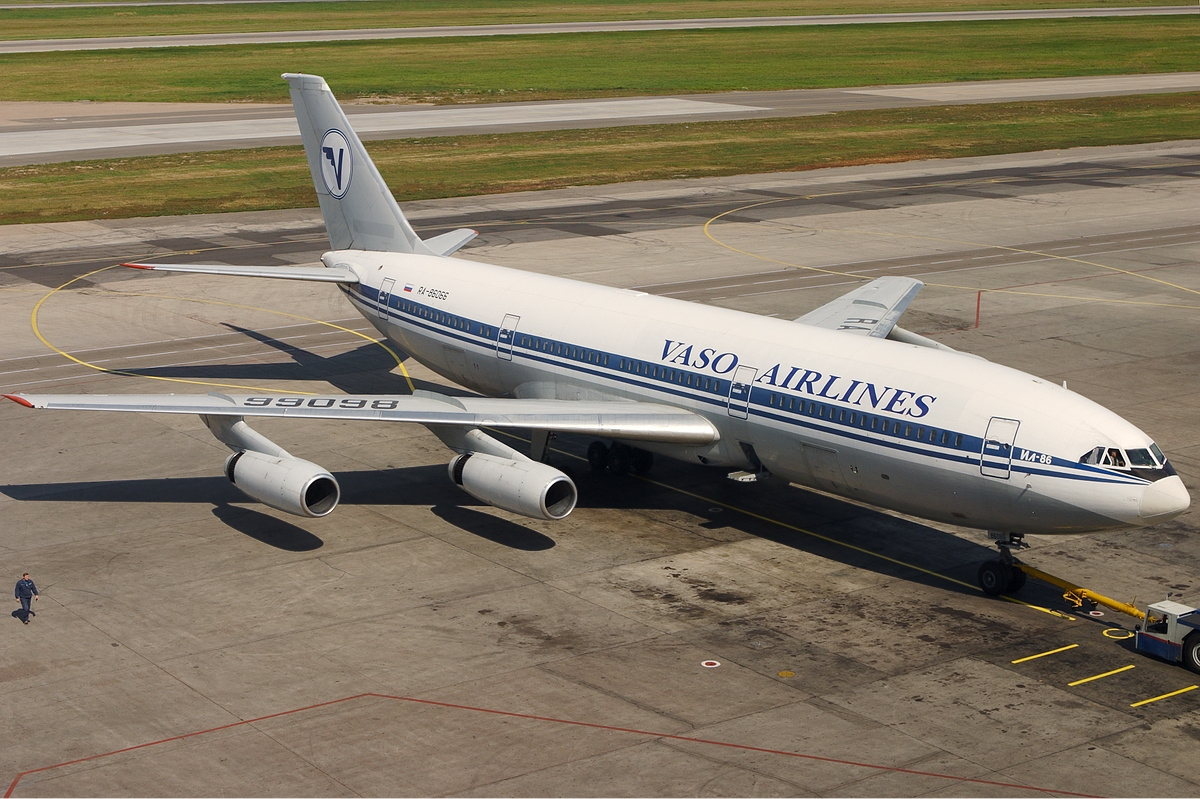
A VASO Airlines Ilyushin Il-86

== Ownership structure ==
- JSC “Ilyushin Interstate Aircraft-Building Company” (30.0% of the shares)
- JSC “Ilyushin Aviation Complex” (27.1% of the shares)
- Private shareholders (42.9% of the shares)

== Incidents ==
On March 5, 2011 an An-148 plane crash occurred in the Belgorod Oblast during a training flight performed by VASO testers and pilots from Myanmar. 6 people who were on board died.
