= Ilyushin Il-96 =

Russian four-engined long-range wide-body jet airliner

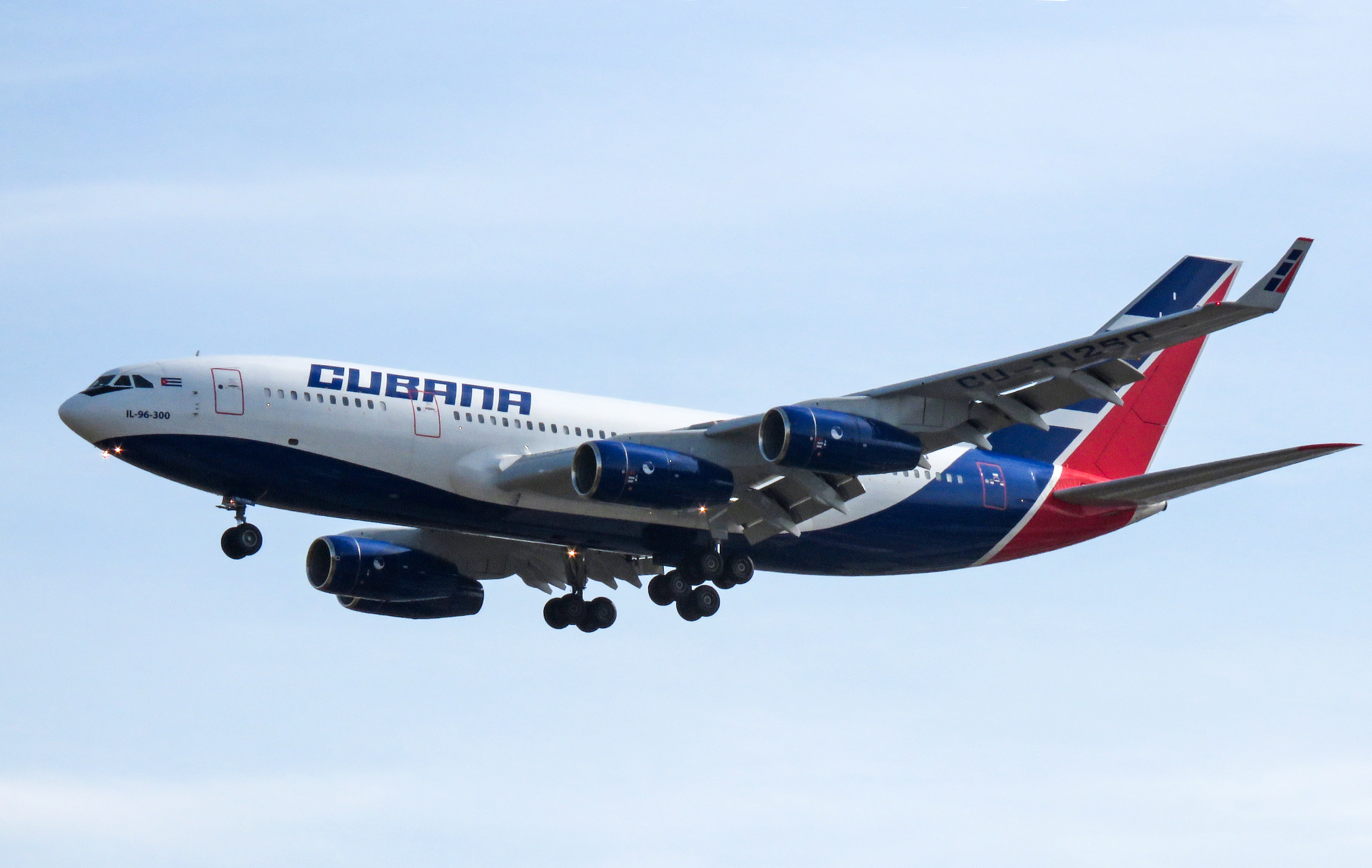
- A Cubana de Aviación Il-96-300

General information
- Type: Widebody jet airliner
- National origin: Soviet Union/Russia
- Designer: Ilyushin
- Built by: Voronezh Aircraft Production Association
- Status: In low-rate production; in service
- Primary users: Russian Air Force Cubana de Aviación; Sky Gates Airlines; Aeroflot (historical)
- Number built: 34

History
- Manufactured: 1992–present
- Introduction date: 29 December 1992 with Aeroflot
- First flight: 28 September 1988; 38 years ago
- Developed from: Ilyushin Il-86

The Ilyushin Il-96 (Russian: Илью́шин Ил-96) is a Russian four-engined long-haul wide-body jet airliner designed by Ilyushin in the former Soviet Union and manufactured by the Voronezh Aircraft Production Association in Voronezh, Russia. It is powered by four high-bypass Aviadvigatel PS-90 twin-spool turbofan engines. As of 2026, the Il-96 is used as the main Russian presidential aircraft. The type's only remaining commercial operator in passenger service is Cubana de Aviación, while Sky Gates Airlines operates two cargo variants.

== Development ==
=== Initial development ===
Despite representing a huge advance in technology for the Soviet Union, the serviceable but ultimately disappointing performance of the Ilyushin Il-86, especially in regards to range spurred Ilyushin to begin planning for the long range Il-86D variant and the design was completed in 1976. The primary changes from the base Il-86 included slightly longer wings and increased fuel capacity. The Il-86D project was eventually cancelled, but it laid the foundation for the Il-96, which is essentially a heavily modified and upgraded version of the older design. The new Il-96 featured larger wings, a shorter fuselage, new modern avionics and systems, and the new PS-90A high-bypass turbofan, which greatly decreased fuel consumption and increased overall performance. The prototype was first flown 20 September 1988 and the aircraft was certified in 1992. Aeroflot began passenger service in 1993.

=== Development since the 2000s ===
In June 2005, the Volga-Dnepr Group signed a 15-year financial agreement with Ilyushin Finance Corporation (IFC) to take delivery of two new-build Il-96-400T aircraft, to be operated by Volga-Dnepr's subsidiary AirBridge Cargo. The first was due to have been delivered in late 2006. The Cuban Government newspaper Granma announced on 3 January 2006 the first official flight of the Cubana Il-96-300, from Havana to Buenos Aires, Argentina.

On 11 August 2009 Russian Minister of Industry and Trade Viktor Khristenko announced that manufacturing of the Il-96-300 would cease. In particular, the Il-96-300 had been deemed inferior to counterparts from Boeing and Airbus, and the manufacturer could not arrange commercially viable mass production, making only one aircraft per year. The Il-96-400T cargo version was to remain in production.

On 9 October 2015, it was announced that an updated version of the Il-96 may be produced. This decision was taken due to the current diplomatic situation between Russia and the West, and the dependency of the Russian aerospace industry on Airbus and Boeing. In September 2017, the Vice President of Russia's United Aircraft Corporation Aleksandr Tulyakov announced the start of development of the 250–280 seat, wide-body long-haul aircraft in partnership with Chinese builders. The aircraft is to be a development of the Russian-designed IL-96 and will be assembled in China. A new engineering center will be built in Russia to undertake technical and electronics production. As of 2018, Ilyushin also had been studying a new variant of airliner based on Il-96, powered by two Aviadvigatel PD-35s rated at 340 kN (76,000 lb_{f}), developed by 2025 from the PD-14, or powered by foreign powerplants. The goal would be to reduce fuel consumption and maintenance costs.

In March 2022, after international sanctions during the Russo-Ukrainian War, the CEO of Rostec Sergey Chemezov mentioned that relaunching large scale production of the Ilyushin Il-96 and Tupolev Tu-214 was being considered. By 2026 two decommissioned Il-96 aircraft had been restored to service in response to the country's shrinking civilian airliner fleet.

== Design ==
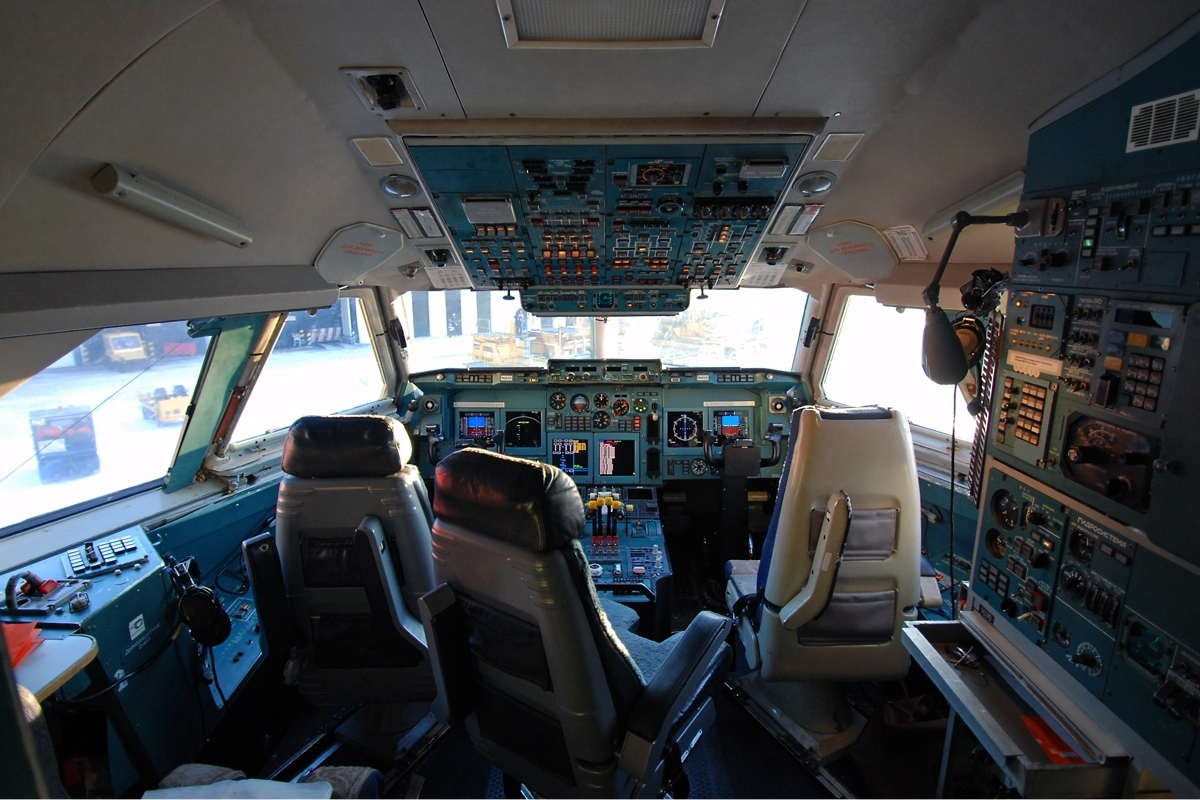
Cockpit of an Aeroflot Il-96-300

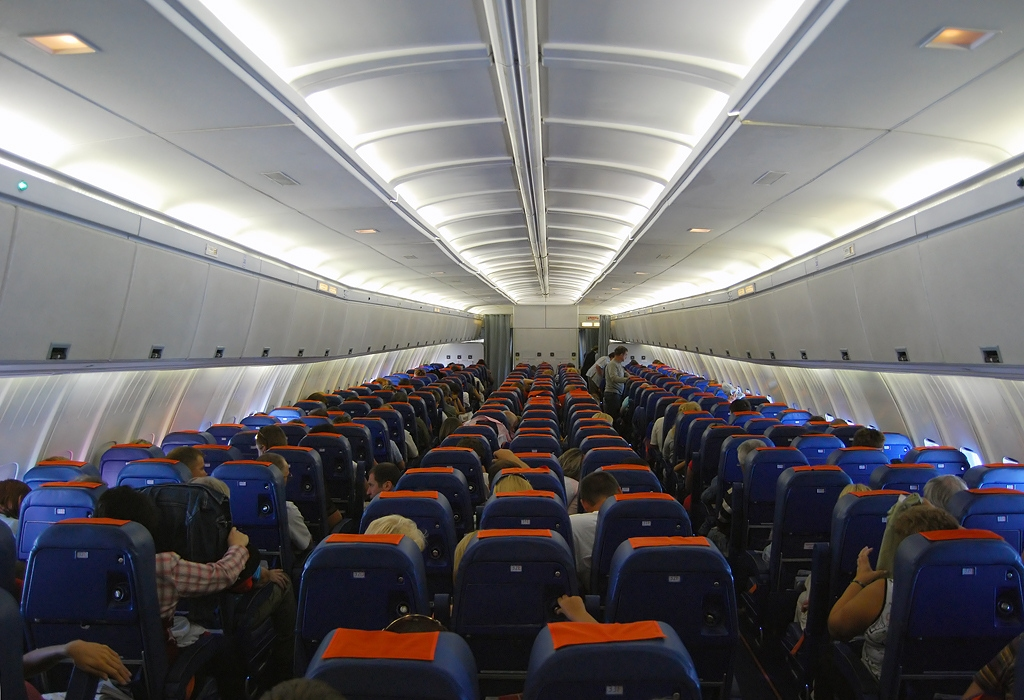
Interior of an Ilyushin Il-96 operated by Aeroflot

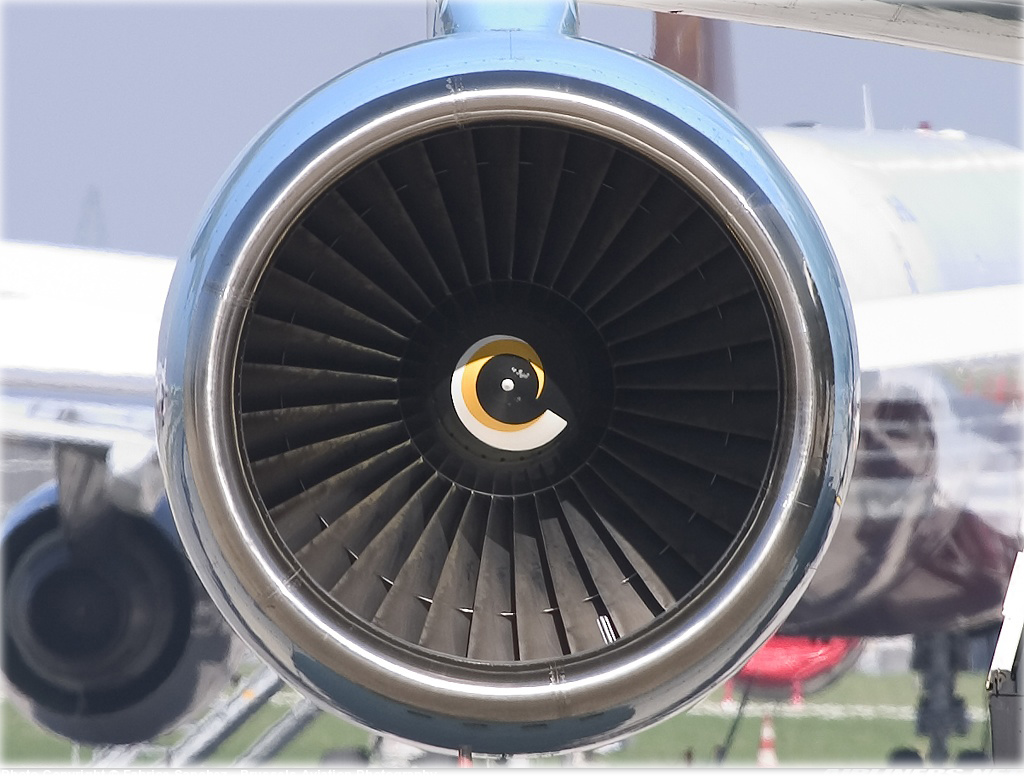
PS-90A engine

The Ilyushin Il-96 is a shortened, long-range, and advanced technology development of the Soviet Union's first widebody airliner, the Ilyushin Il-86. It features supercritical wings fitted with winglets, a glass cockpit, and a fly-by-wire control system. The basic Il-96-300 is equipped with modern Russian avionics integrating six multi-function colour LCD displays, inertial and satellite navigation systems, and a Traffic Collision Avoidance System (including mode "S"). It allows the airplane to be operated with two crew members. The avionics correspond to modern requirements on international routes in Europe and North America (RNP-1) and allow navigation and landing under ICAO CAT III/A conditions. The Il-96 is offered in three main variants: the Il-96-300, Il-96M/T and Il-96-400.

The Il-96-300 has a standard passenger capacity of 262 seats in a two-class configuration with 18 seats with a seat pitch of 54 inches (140 cm) and 244 seats with a pitch of 32 inches (81 cm), of which typical seating is 3–3–3 (layout), but low density seating is possible with 2–4–2 (layout). Galleys are positioned on the upper deck, and the lower deck can accommodate 18 LD-3 containers and crew rest areas.

== Operational history ==
Russian flag carrier Aeroflot began service on December 29, 1992, with the type allowing nonstop flights between Moscow and cities such as Havana or San Francisco, a role previously reserved for the aging Il-62, as the newer Il-86 did not have the required range to make the journey nonstop. Aeroflot would operate 7 airframes with all being delivered in 1992-1994, with their last operational example RA-96007 being retired and bought by Cubana in 2015.

== Variants ==
There are two variants of the Il-96. The Il-96-300 was launched in 1985 with introduction into service in 1993. The Il-96M was launched in 1993 with introduction into service in 2000.

=== Il-96-300 ===
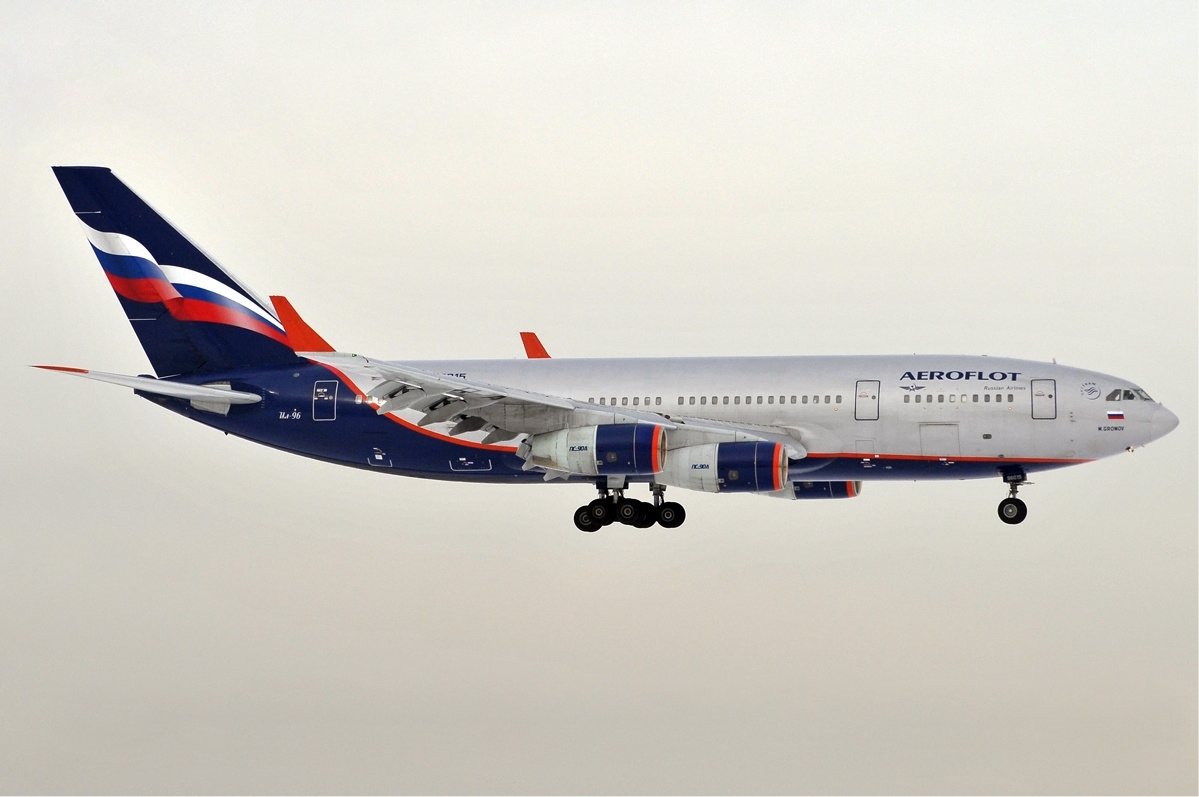
Aeroflot Il-96-300 in 2011

The Il-96-300 is the initial variant and is fitted with Aviadvigatel (Soloviev) PS-90A turbofans with a thrust rating of 16,000 kgf (157 kN, 35,300 lbf). Development started in the mid-1980s while the first prototype flew on 28 September 1988. Range with 262 passengers and fuel reserves (for holding 75 minutes at an altitude of 450 m [1,480 ft]) in a two-class configuration is about 11,000 km (5,940 nmi), allowing flights from Moscow to US West Coast cities, a great improvement over the Ilyushin Il-86.

==== Il-96-300PU ====
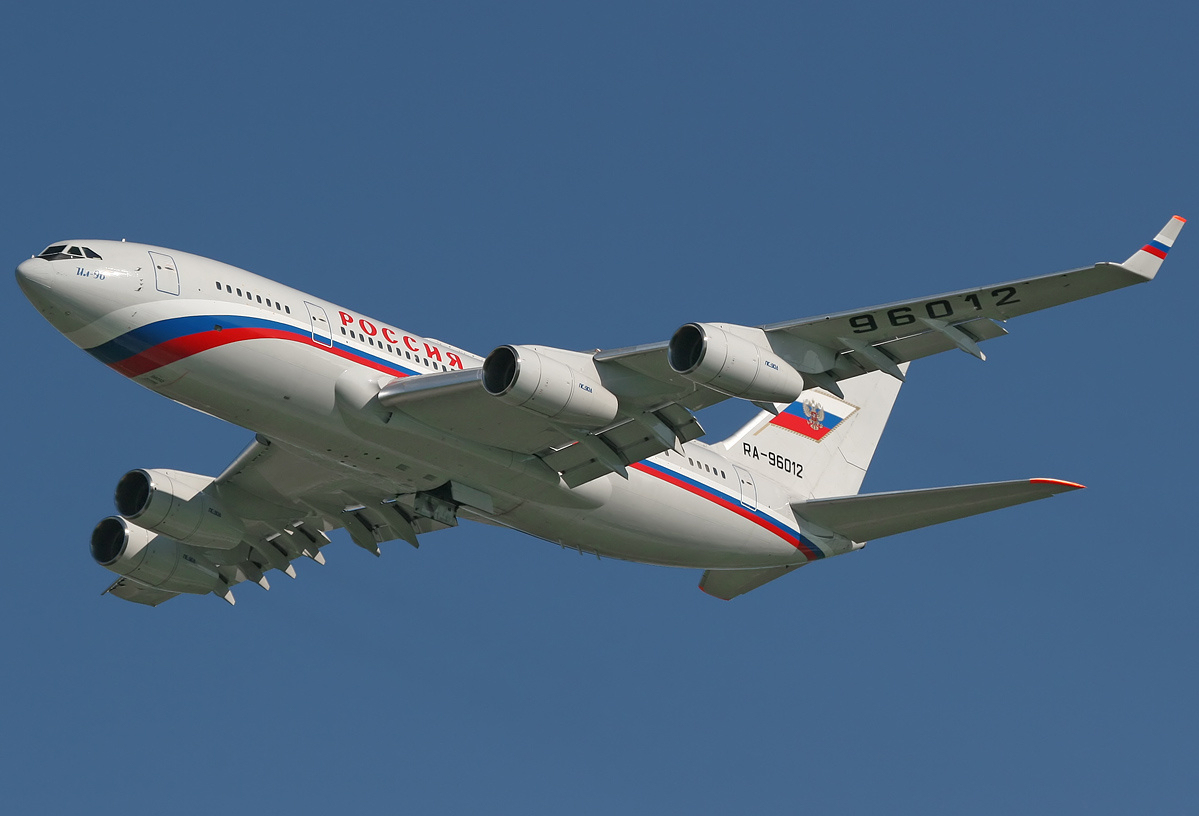
Russia State Transport Company Il-96-300

A highly customized version of the Il-96-300, called the Il-96-300PU (PU in Russian stands for command post), is used as the primary aircraft in the Russian presidential aircraft fleet. A total of five planes were used by Russian presidents Boris Yeltsin, Vladimir Putin, and by Dmitry Medvedev as VIP planes. The VIP aircraft are operated by a special squadron of the Rossiya Airlines.

The Cuban leadership uses the IL-96-300.

==== Il-96-300V ====
There were plans to produce a variant dubbed Il-96-300V which would include two sets of airstairs in it.

=== Il-96M ===
The Il-96M is a stretched variant of the Il-96-300. It features a 10 m (30 ft) fuselage stretch, is 15 tonnes (33,000 lb) heavier, is fitted with Western-style avionics, and is powered by four Pratt & Whitney PW2337 engines with a thrust rating of 165 kN (37,000 lbf). Range with 312 passengers in a three-class configuration or 92 tonne (203,000 lb) payload is about 10,400 km (5,600 nmi). This turned it into a true and vastly more capable Il-86 successor. Development on the M/T variant stalled when the US Export–Import Bank suspended talks on financing the engines and avionics, following pressure from Boeing. The dispute was later settled following an Aeroflot order for ten Boeing 737-400s—placed in April 1997 in a deal worth US$440 million that were granted a tax exemption by the Russian government. Nevertheless, the financing was blocked again when four Boeing 767-300ERs also ordered by Aeroflot were not included in the accorded exemption. The deal was never realised.

=== Il-96-400T ===
This is the freighter version of the Il-96-400. It is powered by four Aviadvigatel PS-90A1 engines. Only a handful of Il-96-400T aircraft were built and most of them were in storage until the outbreak of the Ukraine war. Sanctions on Russia by Boeing and Airbus have changed the situation though and in December 2023, Sky Gates who are owned by Red Wings leased an IL-96-400T and started using it to carry cargo to and from Russia. The plane received an overhaul prior to being leased in order to make sure it met air worthiness standards. Russian media suggest a second Il-96-400T is being overhauled in late 2023 and it too will be leased to Sky Gates in early 2024, once the overhaul is complete.

=== Il-96-400 ===
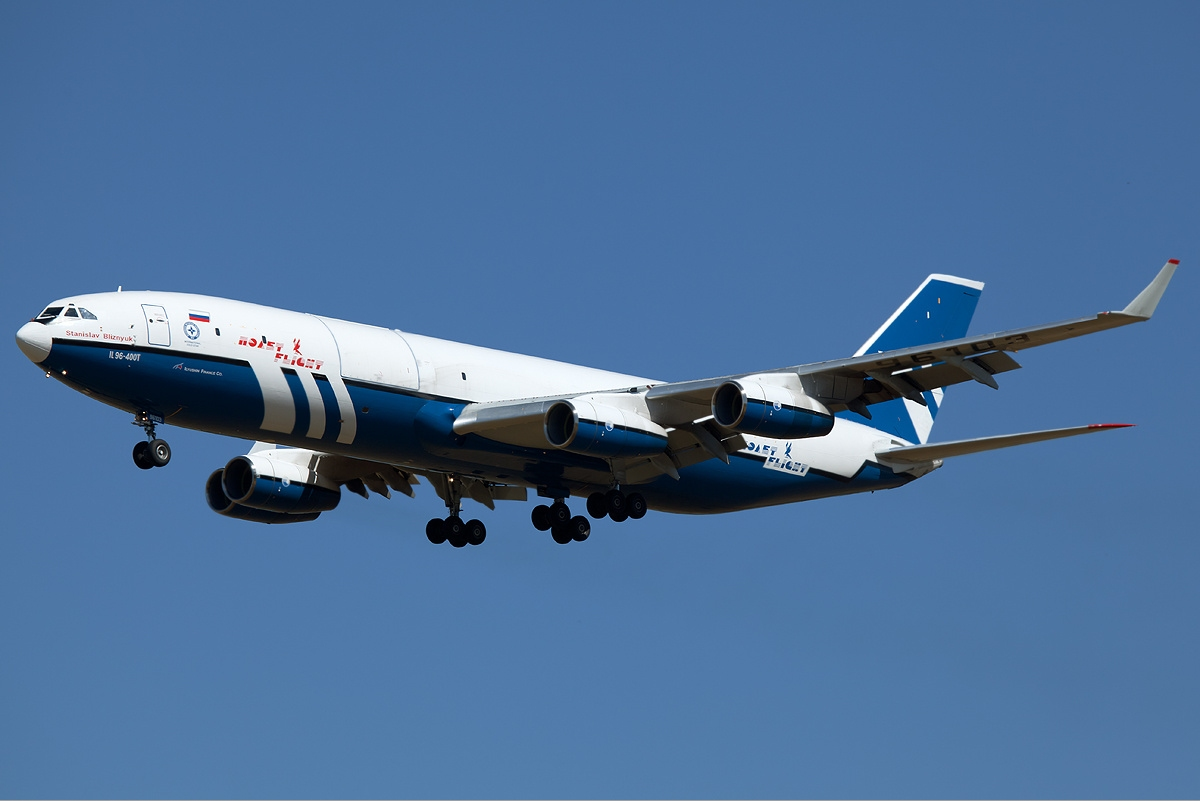
Ilyushin Il-96-400T

The Il-96-400 is similar to the Il-96M, but features Russian avionics and engines. It is powered by four Aviadvigatel PS-90A1 turbofans and can carry up to 436 passengers. Typical two-class configuration will have 386 passengers. Range with 315 passengers in a three-class configuration is about 10,000 km. A special version, dubbed Il-96-400VT, was reported on Friday 19 March 2010 by The Wall Street Journal to bid on the US$40 billion Air Force Tanker Program contract. In February 2013, Cubana signed a deal for the order of three 350-seater Ilyushin Il-96-400s.

==== Il-96-400VPU ====
One modified Il-96-400, the Il-96-400VPU is being converted to serve as an Airborne Command Post by the Russian Aerospace Forces as part of "Project Zveno-3S" calling for two such aircraft to enter service to replace the current Il-80-based planes.

==== Il-96-400M ====
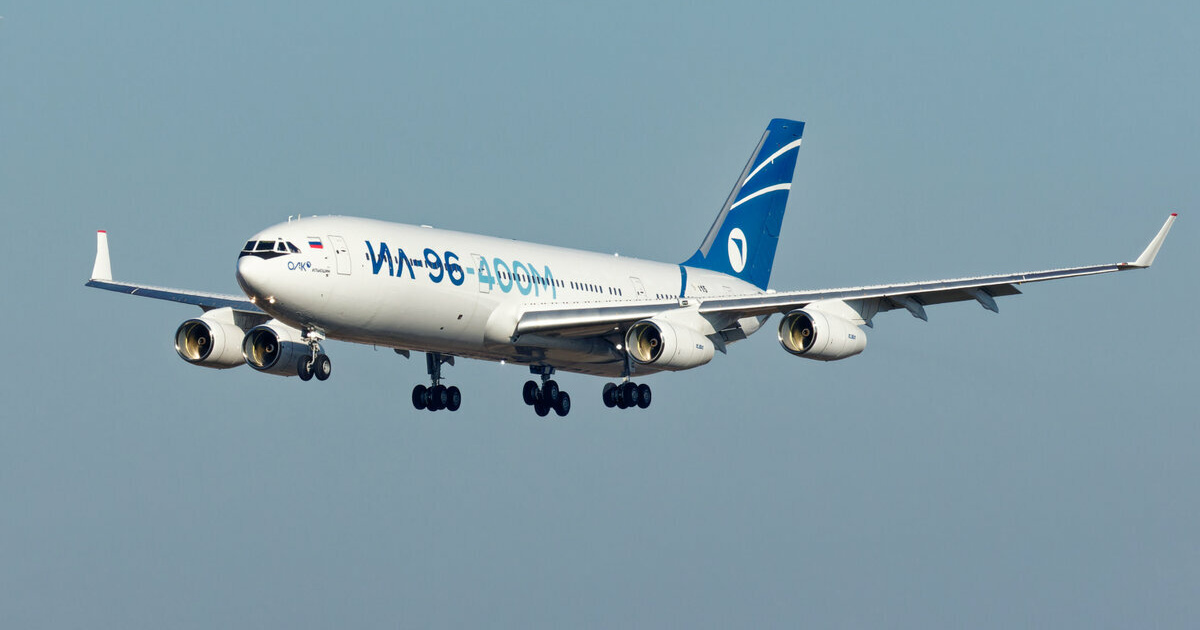
The Il-96-400M prototype flying in United Aircraft Corporation colors

In February 2017, it was announced that Russia's United Aircraft Corporation had signed a contract with its subsidiary Ilyushin Aviation Complex for the development of a new version of Ilyushin Il-96-400 wide-body passenger airliner to compete with the Boeing 777-9 and Airbus A350-1000. The Il-96-400M is the passenger version of the Il-96-400T cargo aircraft. Its fuselage is 9.65 m (31 ft 8 in) longer than the existing Il-96-300 passenger variant. The new interior will fit with overhead compartment, and the planned seating capacity is 390 passengers. In 2017, the Russian Government injected ₽3.6 billion ($57.4 million) into the Ilyushin Il-96-400M.

By January 2020, the first test-flight airframe was in final assembly and the wing and fuselage were joined, to be finished at the end of 2020 before a first flight in 2021, but by April 2021 it was announced that the aircraft will not enter mass production as expected, only two will be produced, because of "lack of interest from the airlines and the worldwide idling of the long-range fleet due to the pandemic". Still, due to sanctions, on 15 August 2022, it was announced that the first flight of the Il-96-400M was planned. On 7 June 2023, the United Aircraft Corporation rolled out Russia's future wide-body passenger airliner. It made its first flight on 1 November 2023, but the engine is still PS-90. Starting in 2025, this model will be included in the national plan to prepare for mass production.

==== Il-96-400TZ ====
In January 2015, a new tanker variant of the Il-96, designated the Il-96-400TZ (Russian: ТЗ for топливозаправщик – fuel replenisher), was proposed, with an initial order for two aircraft placed by the Russian Ministry of Defense. The new tanker would have been able to transfer more than 65 tons (IL-78M 40 tons) of fuel at a distance of up to 3500 km (Il-78M 3000 km). Universal aviation refueling systems ORM-1, proven on existing combat aircraft tankers Il-78/78М, would have been installed on the aircraft. According to Alexei Krivoruchko, Russian Deputy Minister of Defense, factory trials of the Il-96-400TZ are expected to be completed in May, 2020. However this is previously cancelled due to differences between Russian MoD and Ilyushin, and in favor of much proven Il-76MD-90A platform, which is the Il-78M-90A. The two airframes, RA-96103 and RA-96101 was later reverted back to Il-96-400T standard and delivered to Sky Gates Airlines.

=== Il-96-500T ===
Projected freighter version of Il-96 with an enlarged fuselage to transport oversize cargo.

=== Il-96-550 ===
Projected double-deck version of Il-96 for 550–600 passengers. Intended to be powered by Kuznetsov NK-93 propfan engines, which underwent flight testing in 2007 before the project was cancelled. Development of the Il-96-550 did not proceed further.

== Operators ==
=== Current operators ===
As of December 2024, current operators of the Ilyushin Il-96 are:

| Operator | Aircraft type | In service | On order | Stored |
|---|---|---|---|---|
| (Cuba) Cubana de Aviación | Il-96-300 | 1 | – | 3 |
| (Russia) Sky Gates Airlines | Il-96-400T | 2 | – | – |
| (Russia) Ilyushin | Il-96-300 | 1 | – | – |
| (Russia) Rossiya Special Flight Detachment | Il-96-300 | 11 | – | 2 |
| (Russia) Russian Ministry of Defence | Il-96-400 | 2 | – | – |
| Total | | 17 | 0 | 5 |

=== Production by year ===
The following sheet lists the number of finished aircraft per year since the start of its production:

| Year | 1988 | 1989 | 1990 | 1991 | 1992 | 1993 | 1994 | 1995 | 1996 | 1997 | 1998 | 1999 | 2000 | 2001 | 2002 | 2003 | 2004 | 2005 |
|---|---|---|---|---|---|---|---|---|---|---|---|---|---|---|---|---|---|---|
| Prod | 1 | 2 | 1 | 1 | 2 | 1 | 3 | 2 | 0 | 1 | 0 | 1 | 0 | 0 | 0 | 1 | 2 | 1 |
| Year | 2006 | 2007 | 2008 | 2009 | 2010 | 2011 | 2012 | 2013 | 2014 | 2015 | 2016 | 2017 | 2018 | 2019 | 2020 | 2021 | 2022 | 2023 |
| Prod | 2 | 2 | 0 | 2 | 0 | 1 | 1 | 1 | 0 | 1 | 1 | 0 | 0 | 0 | 0 | 2 | 0 | 1 |

== Accidents and incidents ==
In the entire history of operation with the Il-96, no accidents causing the deaths of passengers or crew have been recorded, according to AeroInside.

- In 2005, Russia indefinitely grounded Ilyushin Il-96-300 passenger aircraft after transport inspectors pointed out malfunctions in the jets’ braking systems. The decision came just weeks after a technical glitch in an Il-96-300 forced Russian President Vladimir Putin to fly in a back-up plane during a visit to Finland.
- On 3 June 2014, RA-96010 of Aeroflot, which had been retired from service, was damaged beyond economical repair in a fire while parked in storage at Sheremetyevo International Airport, Moscow.

== Specifications ==
Data from Ilyushin Aviation Complex, FAA Certification Document A54NM and Il-96-300 Pilot Manual
| Variant | Il-96-300 | Il-96M | Il-96T | Il-96-400 |
|---|---|---|---|---|
| Cockpit crew | 3 | 2 | | 2/3 |
| Seats (3/2/1-class) | 237/263/300 | 307/340/420 | | 315/386/436 |
| Cargo capacity | 25 t | | 776 m^{3} | 196 m^{3} |
| LD3 capacity | 16 | | 32 | |
| Length | 55.35 m (181 ft 7 in) | 64.69 m (212 ft 3 in) | 63.93 m (209 ft 9 in) | |
| Wing | 60.12 m (197 ft 3 in) span, 350 m^{2} (3767.9 ft²), 30° sweep | | | |
| Fuselage | 6.08 m (19.94 ft) diameter, 5.70 m (18.70 ft) cabin width | | | |
| Height | 17.55 m (57 ft 7 in) | | | |
| OEW | 120.4 t (265,198 lb) | 132.4 t (291,630 lb) | 116.4 t (256,387 lb) | 122.3 t (269,383 lb) |
| MTOW | 250 t (551,000 lb) | 270 t (595,000 lb) | 270 t (594,713 lb) | 265 t (583,700 lb) |
| Max. payload | 40 t (88,105 lb) | 58 t (127,753 lb) | 92 t (202,643 lb) | 58 t (127,753 lb) |
| Fuel capacity | 152,620 L (40,322 US gal, 33,575 imp gal) | | | |
| Engines (×4) | Aviadvigatel PS-90A (Note: All the PS-90A turbofan can be upgraded to the new PS-90A2 version, with the latest generation FADEC of western design and many other improvements. The maintenance costs are reduced by 40%. The fuel consumption (SFC) of this version is equivalent to current Western turbofans. PS-90A2 variant meets the ETOPS-180 rules, ICAO-4 and AP-33 (equivalent to FAR-33/JAR-33). The maximum thrust is 16,000 kg or 18,000 kg.) | PW2037 | PW2337 or PS-90A1 | PS-90A1 (Note: Ilyushin has not ruled out the possibility to install other engines (PW, RR, or CFM), depending on the number of requests from customers.) |
| Thrust (×4) | 156.9 kN (35,242 lbf) | 170.1 kN (38,250 lbf) | 166.8 kN (37,500 lbf) | 170.7 kN (38,326 lbf) |
| Cruise | 0.78–0.84 Mach / 529–539 mph / 850–870 km/h / 459–469 kn TAS; 13,100 m (43,000 ft) Ceiling | | | |
| Range | 10,000 km (5,400 nmi; 6,214 mi) (Note: 30 tonne payload) | 11,482 km (6,195 nmi; 7,129 mi) (Note: 30 tonne payload) | 9,700 km (5,237 nmi; 6,027 mi) (Note: 58 tonne payload) | 10,000 km (5,400 nmi; 6,214 mi) (Note: 315 passengers) |
| Takeoff run (MTOW) | 2,340 m (7,677 ft) | 3,000 m (9,843 ft) | 2,700 m (8,858 ft) | 2,700 m (8,858 ft) |
| Landing run | 860 m (2,821 ft) | 1,800 m (5,906 ft) | 1,650 m (5,511 ft) | 1,650 m (5,511 ft) |

== See also ==
Related development

- Ilyushin Il-86

Aircraft of comparable role, configuration, and era

- Airbus A340
- Boeing 777
- McDonnell Douglas MD-11

Related lists

- List of tanker aircraft
- List of civil aircraft
- List of jet airliners
