= Sky Gates Airlines =

Russian cargo airline

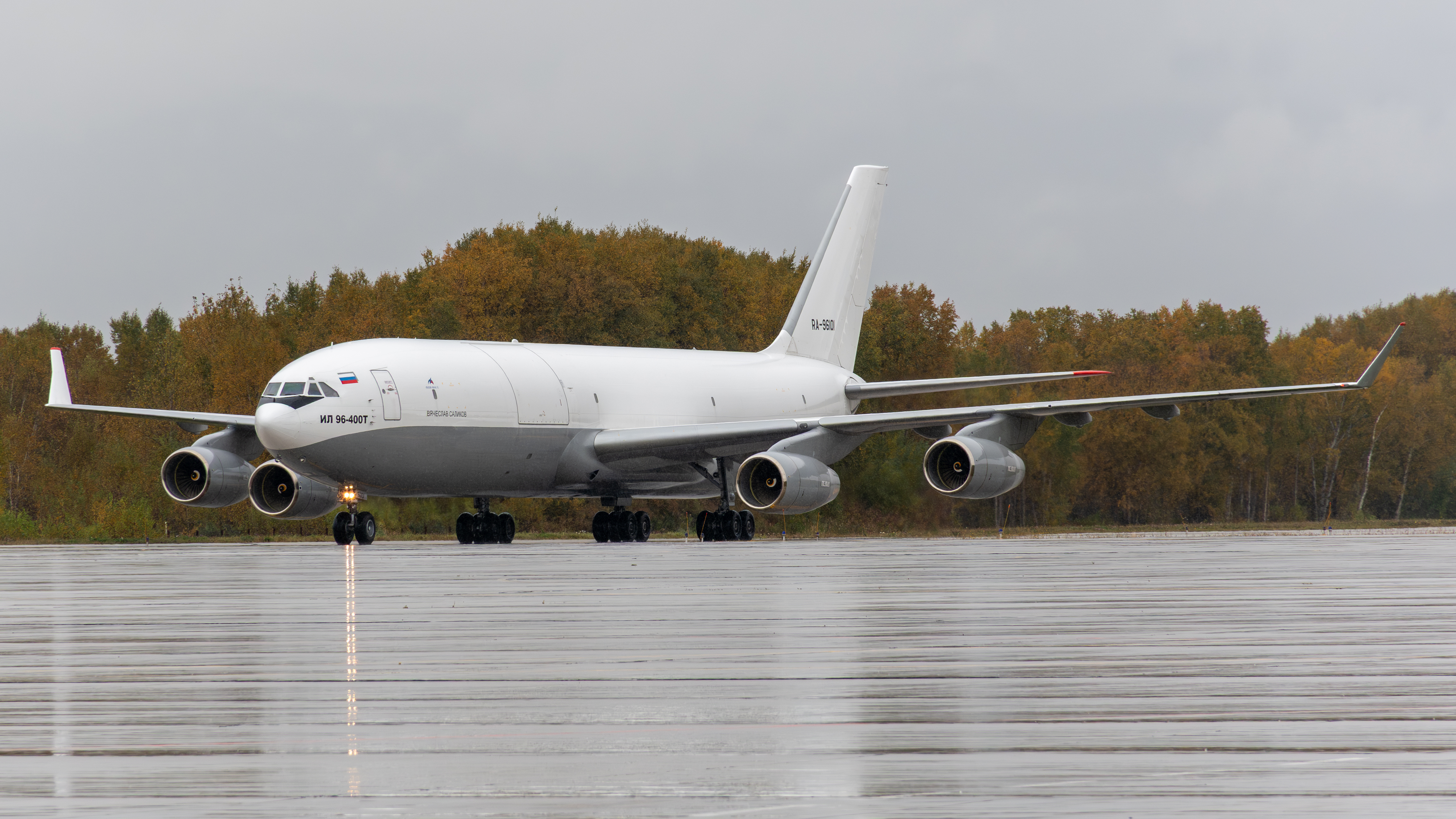
- A Sky Gates Airlines Ilyushin Il-96-400T
| IATA | ICAO | Call sign |
|---|---|---|
| U3 | SAY | SKY PATH |
- Founded: 2015; 11 years ago
- Commenced operations: 2016; 10 years ago
- Hubs: Zhukovsky International Airport
- Secondary hubs: Sheremetyevo International Airport
- Fleet size: 3
- Parent company: Red Wings Airlines
- Headquarters: Moscow, Russia

Sky Gates Airlines is a Russian cargo and passenger airline which operates principally out of Zhukovsky and Sheremetyevo airports in Moscow, Russia, where it was also headquartered.

== History ==
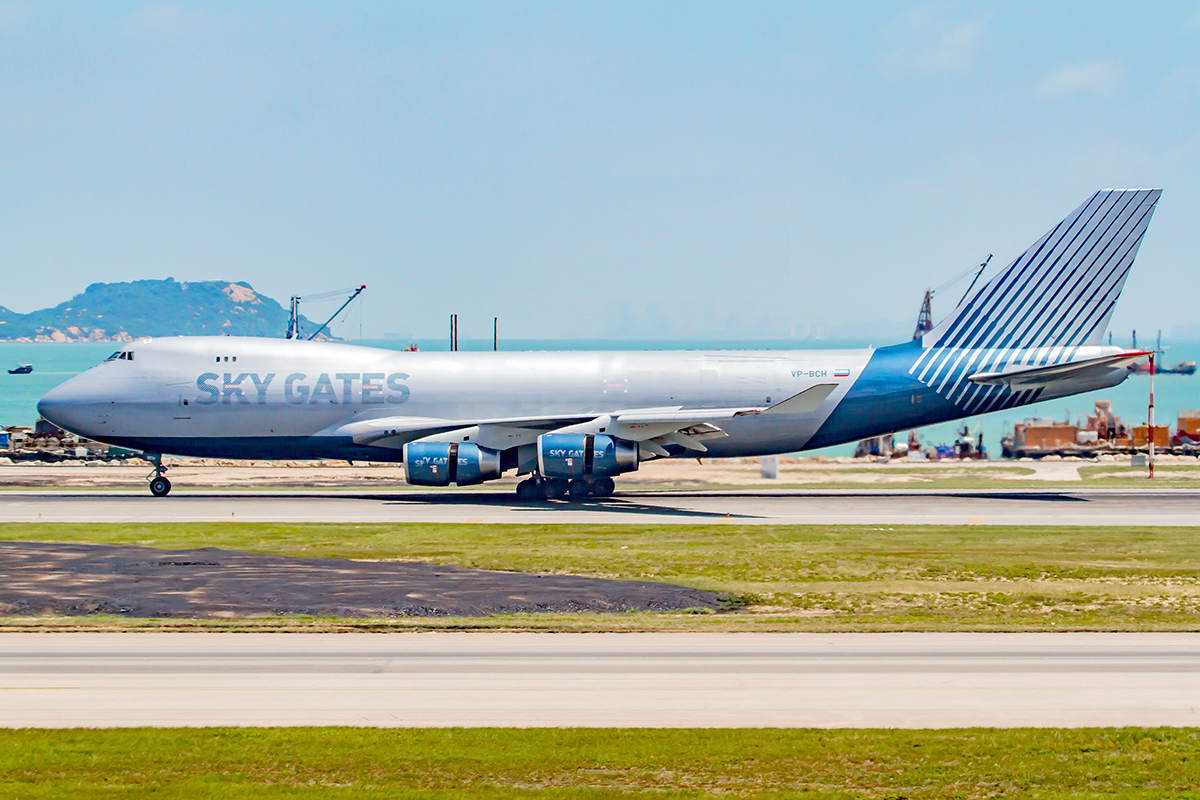
Sky Gates Airlines Boeing 747-400F

In October 2016, Sky Gates commenced domestic and international services from Moscow Sheremetyevo Airport using a Boeing 747-400F leased from Silk Way West Airlines.

Sky Gates Airlines suspended all operations on in February 2022 due to sanctions with plans to restart services in the foreseeable future.

In March 2022, Silk Way West Airlines took over both of Sky Gates' aircraft. In the same month, the operating certificate of the airline was suspended at its request.

In August 2023, the airline was bought out by Red Wings Airlines, and in December of the same year operations were restarted.

== Fleet ==
As of August 2025, Sky Gates Airlines operates the following aircraft:

Sky Gates Airlines fleet
| Aircraft | In fleet | Orders | Notes |
|---|---|---|---|
| Ilyushin Il-76TD | 1 | 0 | |
| Ilyushin Il-96-400T | 2 | 0 | |
| Total | 3 | 0 | |
