= Yakovlev MC-21 =

Twin-engine Russian jet airliner

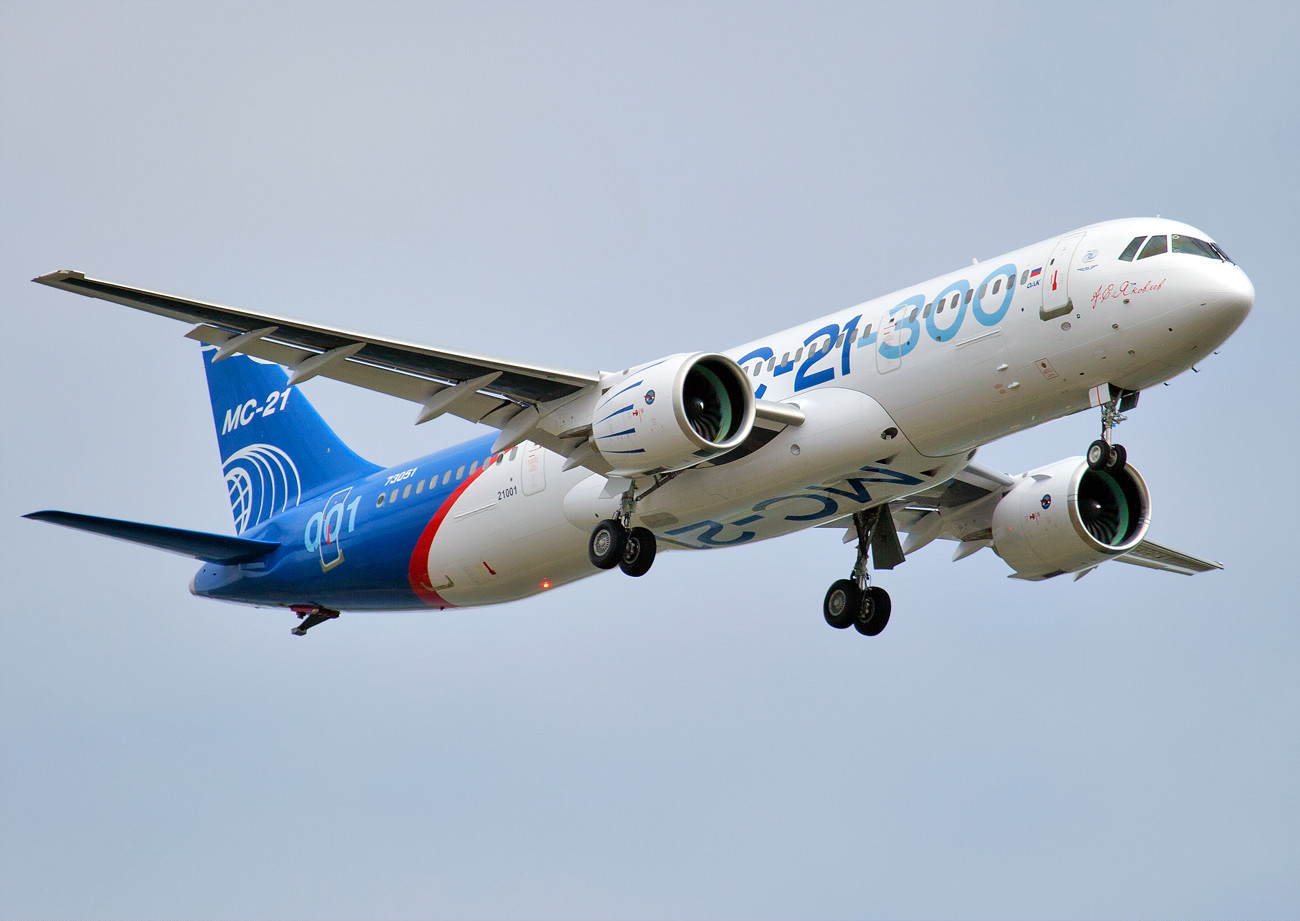
- Maiden flight of the MC-21 in 2017

General information
- Type: Narrow-body airliner
- National origin: Russia
- Designer: Yakovlev Design Bureau
- Built by: Yakovlev Corporation
- Status: In production
- Number built: 8 as of September 2026

History
- Manufactured: 2017–present
- Introduction date: 2027 (expected; deferred from 2022)
- First flight: 28 May 2017

The Yakovlev MC-21 (until June 2026: also known as Irkut MC-21, Russian: Яковлев МС-21 / Ирку́т МС-21) is a single-aisle airliner, fully developed in Russia by the Yakovlev Corporation (formerly known as Irkut Corporation), a branch of the United Aircraft Corporation (UAC), itself a 92%-owned subsidiary of Russia's state-owned aviation giant Rostec. The aircraft made its maiden flight on 28 May 2017 from Irkutsk. Serial production started nearly ten years later, in the third quarter of 2026.

In December 2021, Russian type certification was granted for the MC-21-300 variant powered by Pratt & Whitney PW1000G engines, ahead of its planned introduction with its launch operator Rossiya. However, after the Russian invasion of Ukraine, the aircraft was denied European certification in March 2022.

After international sanctions against Russia were imposed in 2022, Rosaviatsia announced that the MC-21-300 model powered by Pratt & Whitney PW1000G engines would not enter service, and the MC-21-310 powered by Russian-made Aviadvigatel PD-14 engines would be the only production model. In addition, most components would be designed and built locally by Russian companies, resulting in more than 80 per cent of MC-21 parts being produced in Russia. Due to the additional work necessary to integrate the Russian components, the first commercial delivery was delayed until 2027.

== Name, designation and manufacturer ==
In Russian: МС‑21 "Магистральный Самолёт 21 века" Magistral'nyj Samoljot 21 veka translates as "mainline aircraft of the 21st century". It is marketed in the West as the MC-21, though the aircraft's Russian-language designation transliterates as MS-21.

In 2013, Russian deputy premier Dmitry Rogozin indicated that the plane would be designated Yak-242 once it entered serial production, the name of a 1990s proposal of an aircraft of similar size. In 2014, Oleg Demchenko, the president of Irkut Corporation at the time, also preferred the Yak-242 name, claiming it would better reflect the design bureau behind the aircraft. However, he has also said that any renaming decisions would be made after the aircraft's first flight and certification work.

In August 2023, Irkut Corporation formally rebranded the entire company as Yakovlev.

== Development ==
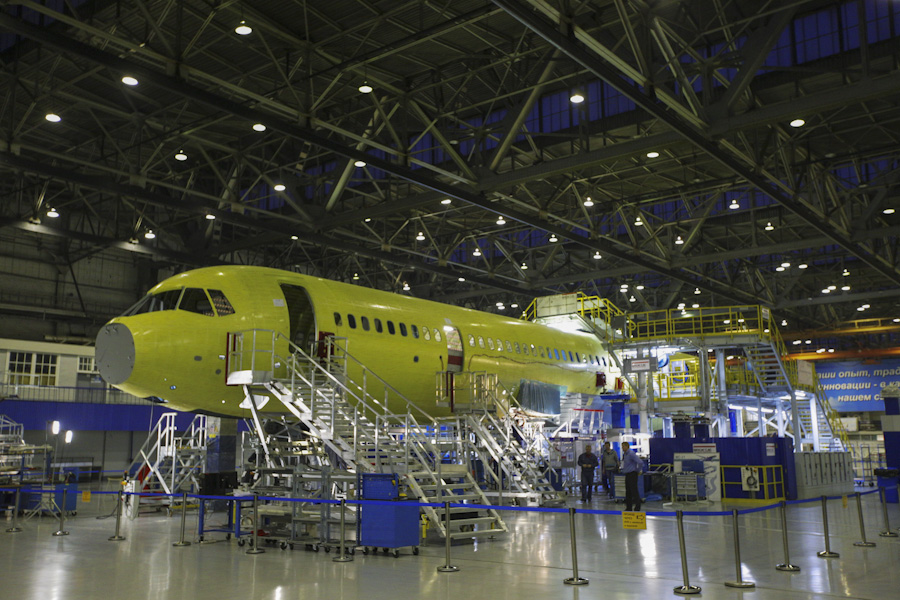
Assembly of prototype in January 2016

The program was launched in 2007, planning a 2016 introduction. In 2009, the MC-21 was in the "pre-design" phase, with projected completion of the first prototype in 2013 and the first flight in 2014. By June 2011, the "pre-design" phase was completed and the "working design" stage was under way with three-dimensional models and drawings for subcontractors and suppliers, to be completed by mid-2012. In February 2012, Russian deputy prime minister Dmitry Rogozin announced it was slated to begin certification tests in 2015/2016 and to enter production in 2020. The unit cost of the MC-21-200 is US$ 72 million, and US$91 million for the MC-21-300.

On 8 June 2016, the -300 was rolled-out in Irkutsk, East Siberia, six years after program launch and with 175 orders. It could be the first commercial aircraft to use out of autoclave composite manufacturing for its wings. The program faces domination of the single-aisle market by Airbus and Boeing. Russian protectionism is hampering access to critical western suppliers for the avionics, landing gear, hydraulics, power systems and engines. Its introduction was delayed to the end of 2018. It is comparable to the Airbus A320neo or Boeing 737 MAX and could replace the outgoing Tupolev Tu-134, Tu-154, Tu-204 and Yak-42.

=== Ground testing ===
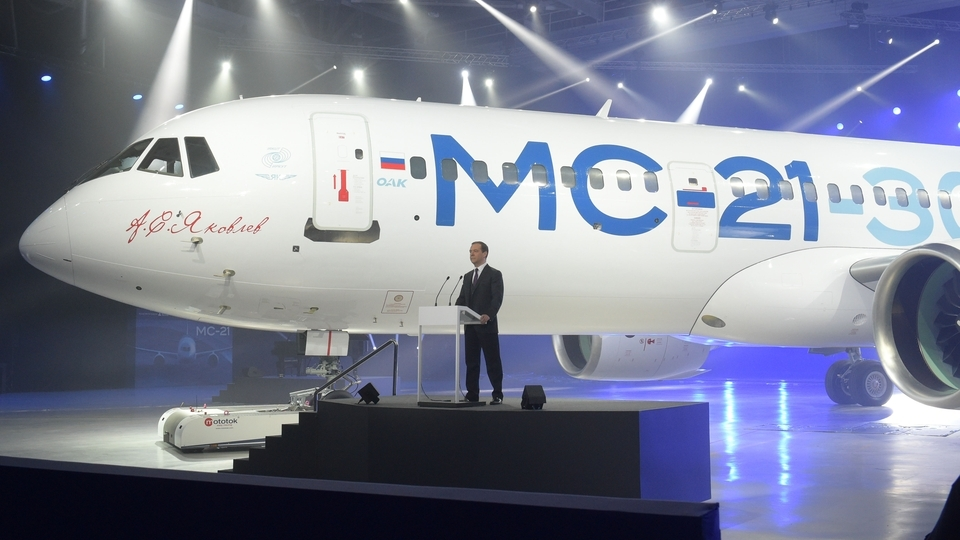
Behind Russian Prime Minister Dmitry Medvedev at the June 2016 roll-out

In February 2017, it passed 90% of the static ultimate load test (150% of the highest load in operation) at the TsAGI but failed the 100% test for which the wingbox will need 25-kilogram (55 lb) reinforcements: this is common for new airliners like the Airbus A380, Boeing 787 or Mitsubishi MRJ, aiming for the smallest possible margin to avoid excess weight; it passed the limit load test (highest load during flight) which enables flight testing which should start in April. Cracks developed at the point of contact between the titanium beam and the composite wing skin in the wingbox. The reinforced wingbox withstood a load exceeding specifications without damage in mid-November at TsAGI Moscow.

In May 2017, it was undergoing systems ground testing including its auxiliary power unit and taxiing tests. After completing taxi and runway roll tests, its maiden flight was scheduled for late May 2017 with Pratt & Whitney Geared Turbofan engines, certified in September 2016 in Russia. The Russian certification was targeted for 2018 and the European Aviation Safety Agency certificate for 2019.

=== Flight testing with P&W engine ===
Video of maiden flight, May 2017

On 28 May 2017, the MC-21-300 completed its successful maiden flight in Irkutsk. Compared with recent 3-to-4-hour maiden flights of western types, this first flight was brief at 30-minute and low, reaching a 1,000 metres (3,300 ft) altitude and 300 kilometres per hour (160 kn; 190 mph). The maiden flight was originally scheduled for December 2016, then to April before finally taking place in May.

Following this maiden flight, trade and industry minister Denis Manturov claimed it will have 12–15% lower operating costs than contemporaries, generating a demand for over 1,000 MC-21s between 2017 and 2037. Aeroflot expected delivery of the first P&W-powered aircraft through Rostec subsidiary Aviakapital leasing in 2019. Its early production rate was projected for 20 aircraft per year.

In August 2017, the first prototype performed nine test flights, analysing stability and controllability in various configurations, altitude, altitude/speed sensors accuracy and engine operation. Its software was adjusted by the results as it was fitted with over 500 strain gauges measuring in-flight loading on the airframe, to verify the initial design, for "several weeks". A second prototype was finalised while three other prototypes were undergoing construction; production of 70 MC-21s annually was initially planned for 2024. Irkut began the second testing phase on 13 September with an eventless 2-hour flight. The phase extended the mass, centering, speed and altitude envelope.

In October 2017, the first prototype flew from Irkutsk Aviation Plant to Moscow Ramenskoye Airport to continue testing at the Gromov Flight Research Institute, a 6-hour flight over 4,500 km (2,400 nmi; 2,800 mi) at 33,000 feet (10,000 m). The flight test programme started on 2 November with a 3-hour flight reaching 39,400 feet (12,000 m). Before being flown to Moscow, 20 flights were conducted in Irkutsk. In November, the second prototype was prepared for flight-tests, followed in 2018 by the third for which final assembly has started.

EASA approval was targeted for mid-2020. Certification testing was to start at the end of 2018 for a mid-2019 Russian type certification after a 1,150 flights effort. Entry into service was then planned for the second half of 2019 with the first five deliveries; within five years, UAC planned to ramp up production to 70 aircraft per year.

The second test aircraft was in final assembly in January 2018 and was to join the flight-test campaign in the first quarter. It was to fly in late February or early March 2018. Its construction was completed by the end of March. It was scheduled to fly in April 2018, and the third test aircraft was to fly in the 2018 fourth quarter. It made its first flight on 12 May for 1 hour 7 minutes, reaching 3,000 metres (9,800 ft) and 215 knots (398 km/h; 247 mph), checking its landing gear retraction and testing wing configurations. On 20 July 2018, it flew from Irkutsk to the Gromov Flight Research Institute near Moscow in six hours.

Initial production steps started in 2018, certification slipped into late 2019 and the first delivery to 2020. For three years after 2018, UAC planned to invest ₽56.4 billion ($899 million) for the MC-21. By October 2018, two EASA test pilots and a test engineer test flew the plane in preparation for European certification. On 3 December, a fuselage was delivered to the Central Aerohydrodynamic Institute at Moscow-Zhukovsky for fatigue testing: repetitive loads will simulate 180,000 cycles. By then, the third flying prototype was assembled, its systems installed and it was undergoing final adjustments, a fourth test aircraft was in assembly, as the first production fuselage. After completing assembly, the third MC-21 was transferred to the flight-test station on 25 December.

By early 2019, the two prototypes had completed 122 test sorties, and following international sanctions against Russia, 1.6 billion roubles ($24.2 million) of additional subsidies were allocated to the program for 2019, followed by 4.11 billion roubles in 2020 and 4.81 billion roubles in 2021: Russian technical content was aimed to be 97% by 2022. The program cost is 438 billion rubles (US$6.6 Bn) In February 2019, the EASA completed initial certification testing with 2.5-to-4-hour flights up to 10,000–33,000 feet (3,000–10,100 m), including high angle-of-attack and stall onset. By then, certification trials were expected to end in the second half of 2020 before first delivery to Aeroflot by the end of the year.

On 18 February 2019, Rostec delayed entry into service for another year to 2021 due to US sanctions, while another 240–250 billion rubles ($3.62–3.78 billion) was needed to complete development. On 16 March 2019, the third test aircraft, which had been fully fitted out with a passenger cabin, made its maiden flight. After painting at Ulyanovsk, on 13 May 2019 it joined the other two test aircraft at Moscow-Zhukovsky Airport, where the certification programme was being conducted.

On 17 September 2019, the third test aircraft made its first international flight from Moscow-Zhukovsky to Istanbul Atatürk Airport. The aircraft was presented to Turkish Airlines at Teknofest Istanbul, and co-production projects were proposed to Turkey. The fourth flight-test aircraft was rolled out on 28 November 2019, and performed its first flight on 25 December 2019.

=== Transition to Russian-produced parts ===
The fully domestically produced МС-21 tail number RA-73057

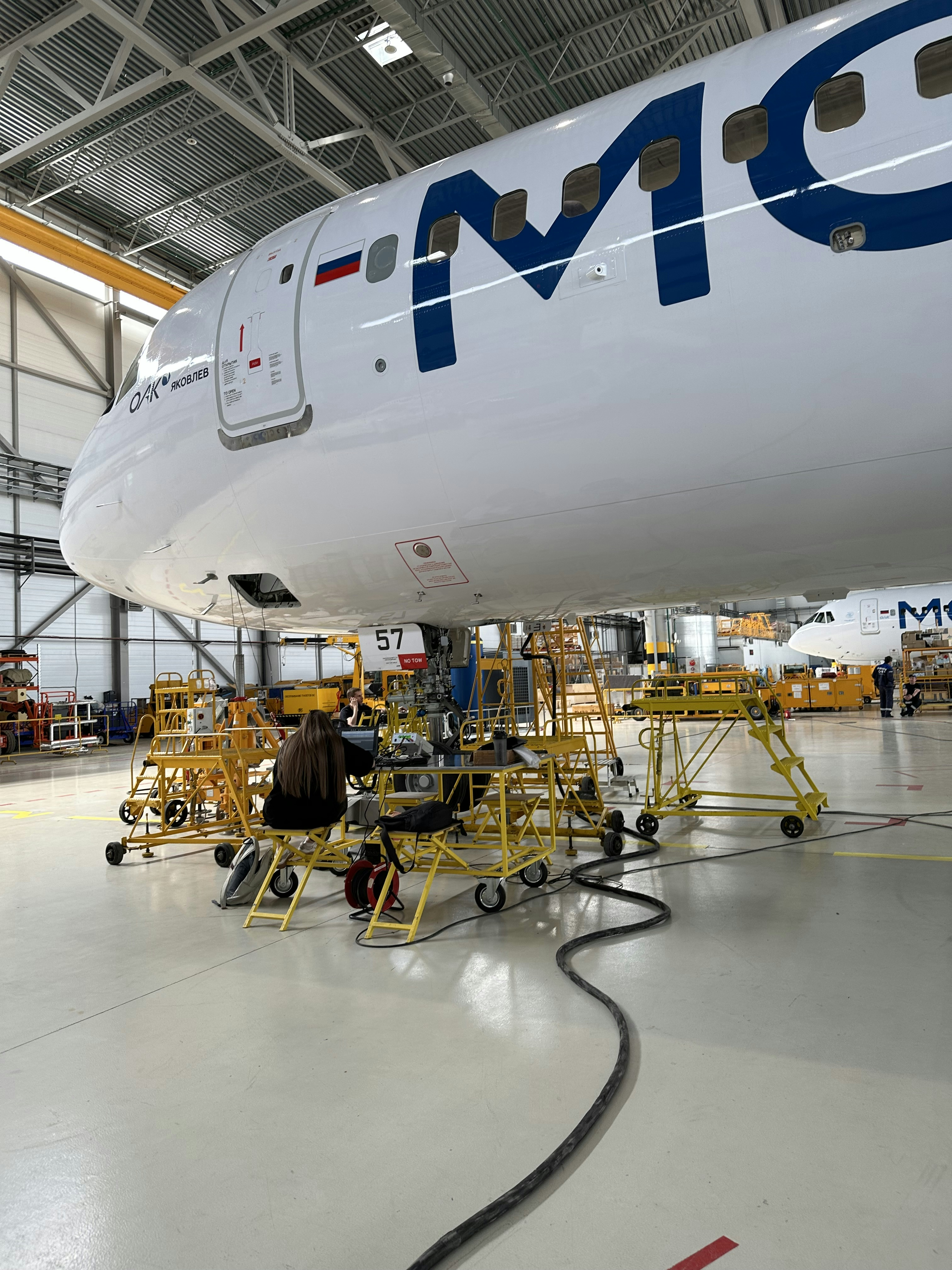
Nose

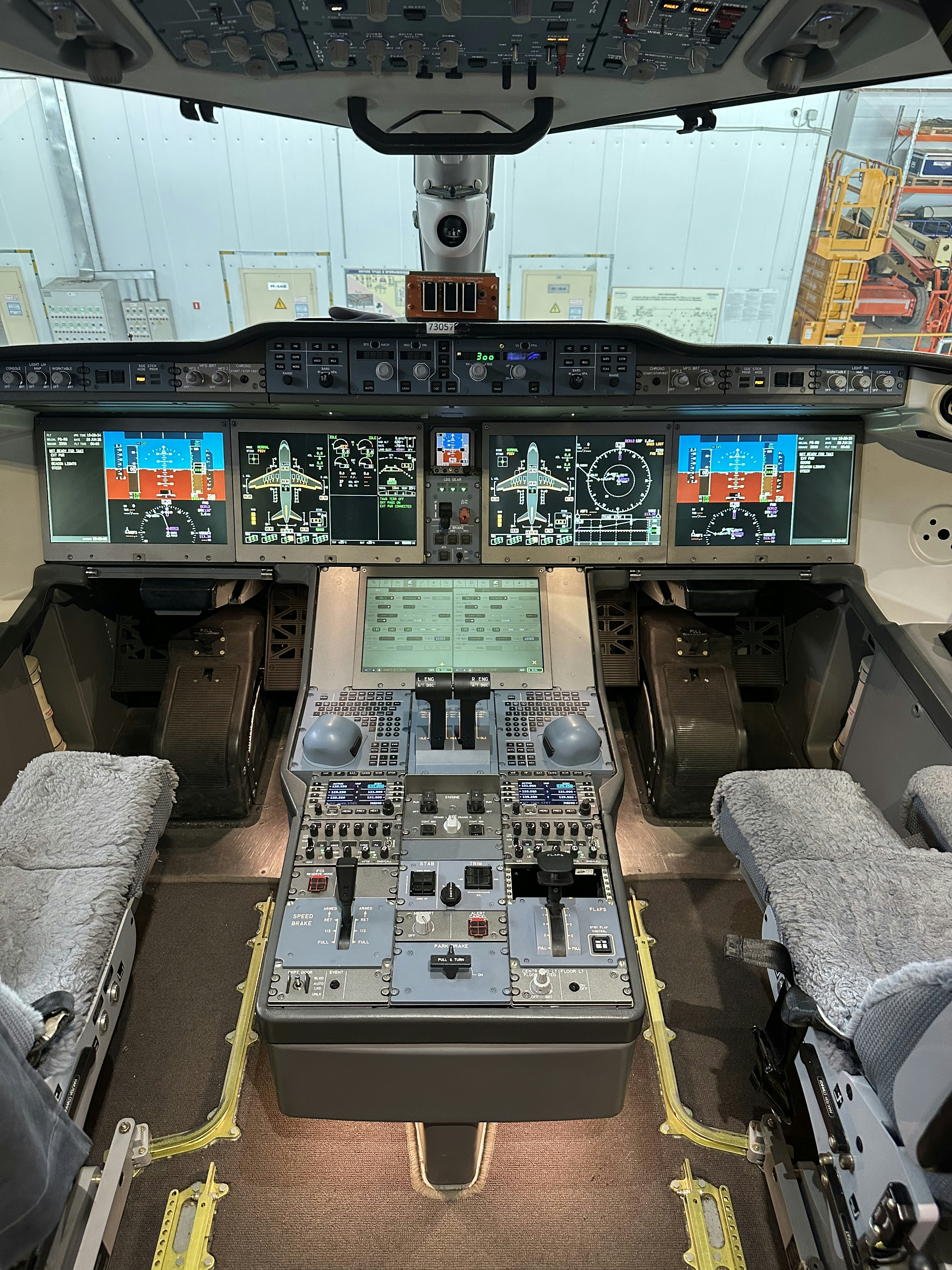
Cockpit

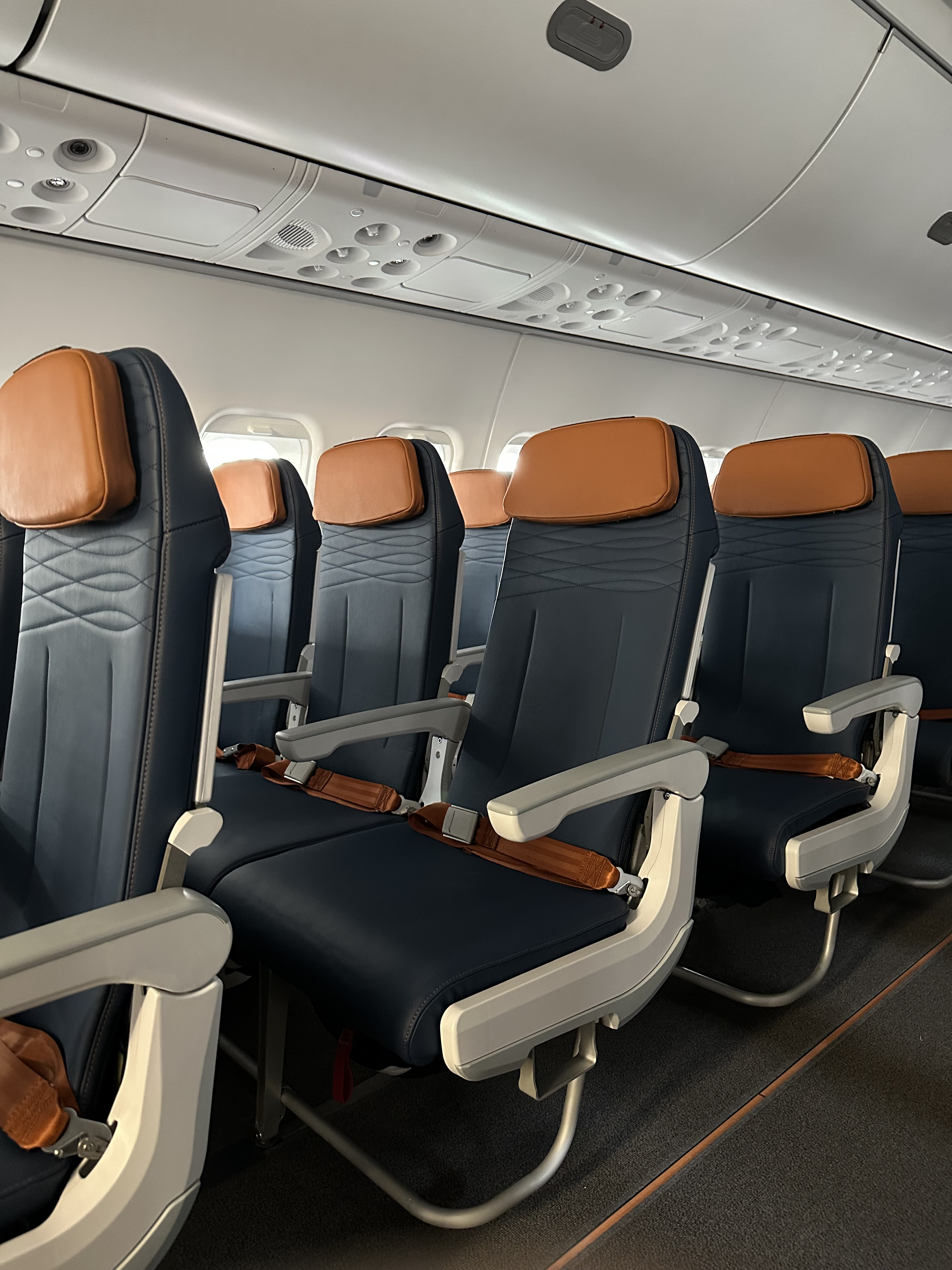
Cabin

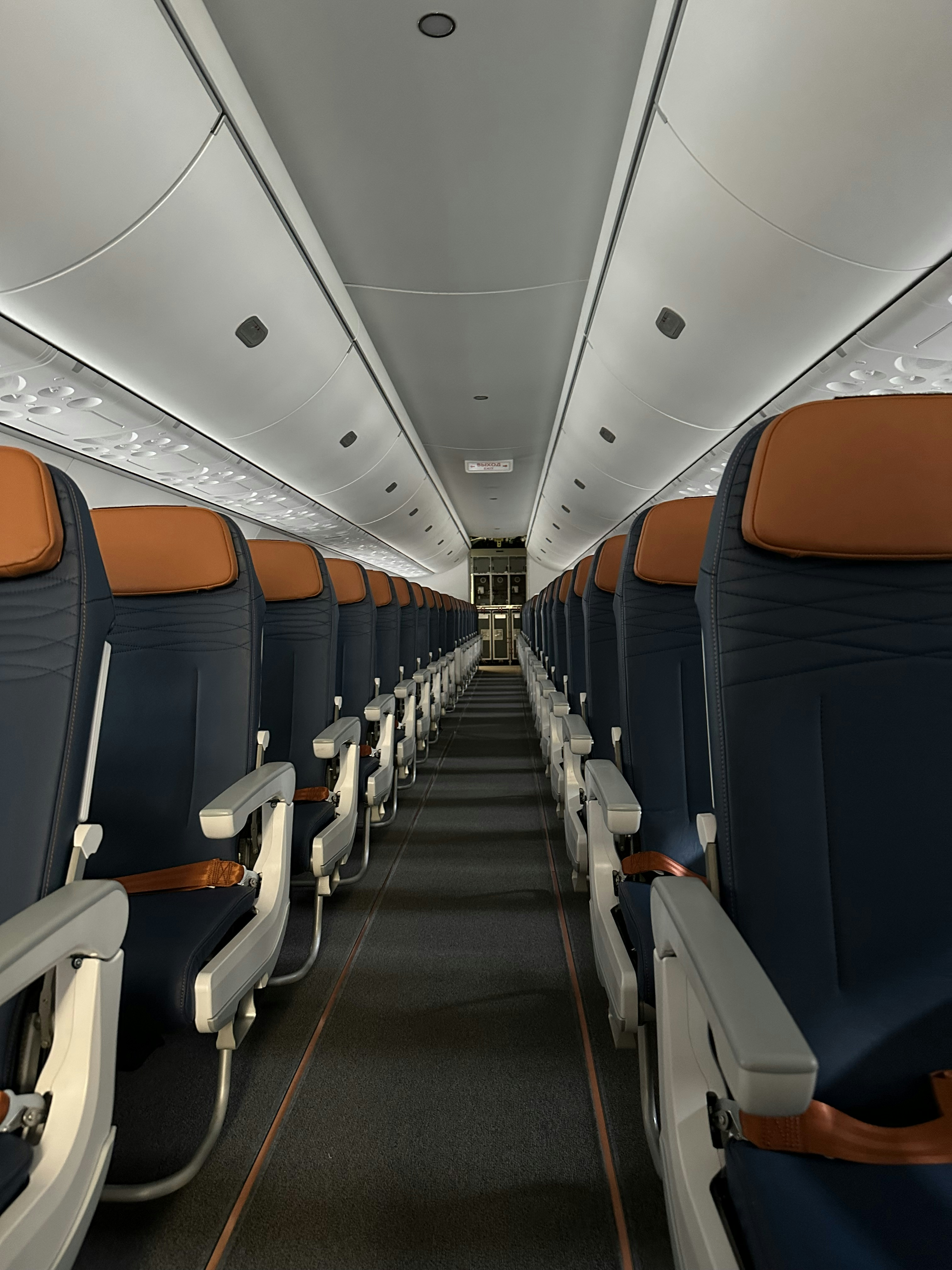
Cabin

In flight

In the beginning of 2019, USA imposed sanctions on Russian companies involved in MC-21 project which prohibited import of composite materials for components for the plane's wings and vertical stabilizer produced by US company Hexcel and Japanese company Toray Industries

In January 2020, Irkut received the first Russian-designed PD-14 engines for installation. A PD-14-powered MC-21-310 made its maiden flight on 15 December 2020 from Irkutsk. In December 2021, Irkut carried out the maiden flight of the first MC-21 to be manufactured with domestically produced composite wings. By October 2022, Irkut had fitted the first flight-test aircraft with PD-14 engines and other domestically produced components and flown a test sortie in the new configuration. The aircraft was to participate in the certification programme, targeted to be completed by the end of 2022.

In 2022, after international sanctions against Russia were imposed due to the 2022 Russian invasion of Ukraine, Rosaviatsia announced that Russia would only use domestic engines. The original model – the MC-21-300 powered by Pratt & Whitney PW1000G engines – would not enter service, and instead production would have to wait for the MC-21-310, powered by the Russian Aviadvigatel PD-14 engine, built by the United Engine Corporation.

The production MC-21-300 was initially planned to consist of between 40% and 50% imported parts, and Irkut needed to replace parts that were to be supplied by the sanctioning countries. The need to use Russian avionics was said to delay the first shipment of an aircraft to late 2024 or to 2025. However, as part of a plan announced in June 2022, aimed at bringing the proportion of domestically produced aircraft to 80% of the Russian fleet by the end of the decade, deliveries of the MC-21 were expected to start in 2024 and reach a delivery rate of 72 aircraft per year by 2029.

In April 2025, according to UAC, the aircraft had received several sets of new Russian-made avionics equipment, including computers, navigation systems and radio communications equipment, as well as a domestic auxiliary power unit, air conditioning and pressure control systems, among others.

=== State aid for late-stage development ===
In late 2025, additional funds were allocated for the further refinement of the aircraft design, with a focus on weight reduction and improving flight performance characteristics. Funds initially intended for the CR929 wide-body aircraft would be reallocated, with up to 2.2 billion rubles available for design refinement. Also although the factory has announced a 30% expansion of its production lines, production volumes are expected to remain low during the first three years of delivery.

=== Flight testing with PD-14 engine ===
The first all Russian produced MC-21 took flight on April 23, 2025. The aircraft, serial number 73055, was the first aircraft fitted with the all new Russian produced parts. These covered the new Russian-made avionics, featuring a new domestic operating system JetOS, and most notably a new all carbon fibre wing and domestic Aviadvigatel PD-14 engines.

By August 2025, the first prototype MC-21-310 aircraft with serial number 73055 had completed 19 flights totalling 74 hours. A second prototype aircraft, serial number 73054, was then added to the certification program in August 2025 to accelerate the process. Completion of the whole certification program was anticipated between September and December 2026, with the MC-21 then entering commercial service.

In June 2026, the first production MC-21-310 plane, MC.0014, was transferred from the final assembly line to the flight-test unit at the Irkutsk Aviation Plant and made its maiden flight with serial-type PD-14 engines on 3 August 2026, completing a 1-hour 23-minute sortie. A second production MC-21-310, aircraft MC.0015, was transferred from the final assembly line to the Irkutsk flight-test unit on 1 September 2026.

=== Introduction ===
==== Pre-sanctions plans (not implemented) ====
Aeroflot initially expected to lease 50 MC-21-300s from Aviakapital for 12 to 18 years and a monthly lease of less than $437,282 each. By 2018, they were to be delivered from the first quarter of 2020 to the third quarter of 2026, with EASA certification targeted for early 2021. Powered by PW1400Gs or possibly PD-14s for the second half of the delivery, Irkut guaranteed less than 9,865 kg (21,749 lb) fuel burn on a 1,750 nmi (3,240 km; 2,010 mi) route with a 14-knot (26 km/h; 16 mph) tailwind. They were guaranteed to reach 2,100h and a dispatch reliability of 96% for the first year, rising to 2,900h and 97% in the second year then 3,750h and 98.5% in the third year.

In October 2018, fuselage panels for the first customer MC-21 were completed by United Aircraft Corporation subsidiary Aviastar. In early 2019, the annual output was targeted to start with 20 airframes initially, rising to 72 airframes in 2025, with 100 and possibly 120 later for a forecast of 850 deliveries.

In July 2021 it was reported that Aeroflot would launch the MC-21-300 with its regional subsidiary Rossiya Airlines in summer 2022. In September 2021, Evgeny Ditrikh, CEO of GTLK (Public Transport Leasing Company of Russia), however, stated that the MC-21 project was in need of new government grants.

By the end of December 2021, Russian type certification was granted for the MC-21-300 variant powered by Pratt & Whitney PW1000G engines, ahead of its planned introduction with its launch operator Rossiya. Additional testing was still needed for high-altitude, strong crosswinds, and low and high temperatures operations. The initial target market was for 800 airframes in Russia over the next 20 years. However, in 2022, after international sanctions against Russia were imposed, Rosaviatsia announced that the variant with Pratt & Whitney engines would not be built. The aircraft was also denied European certification on 14 March 2022.

==== Post-sanctions plans ====
In March 2024, Kommersant reported that the design and testing of new Russian-made equipment would delay the aircraft's service introduction until 2025–2026 and that the MC-21 was currently overweight by 5.75 t (5.66 long tons; 6.34 short tons), rendering it incapable of meeting its original specifications for operating weight, range, and altitude. With a maximum commercial load of 20.3 t (20.0 long tons; 22.4 short tons), range will be reduced to less than 2,000 km (1,200 mi), and the service ceiling will only be 23,000 ft (7,000 m). The original specifications reportedly could not be met unless engine thrust increased by 20%, an increase thought to be infeasible in commercial operations.

Industry analysts in 2024 questioned the revised delivery schedule due to UAC's reliance on unproven engines and parts from Russian suppliers that also provided parts to the Russian military. Analysts said suppliers were generally struggling to procure enough components to satisfy military orders, suggesting that civil MC-21 deliveries would be delayed by parts-shortages if military parts-deliveries had higher priority.

The PD-14 engines passed certification and entered mass production in early 2025. Serial production of the MC-21 airliner was then authorized on 28 March 2025. Due to the immaturity of the PD-14 jet engine production line, a proposal was initially made to use an upgraded version of the existing PS-90 engine to accelerate the airframe’s delivery timeline, but this idea was never implemented. Deliveries of the MC-21-310 model are scheduled to begin with launch customer Aeroflot in the second half of 2027.

== Design ==
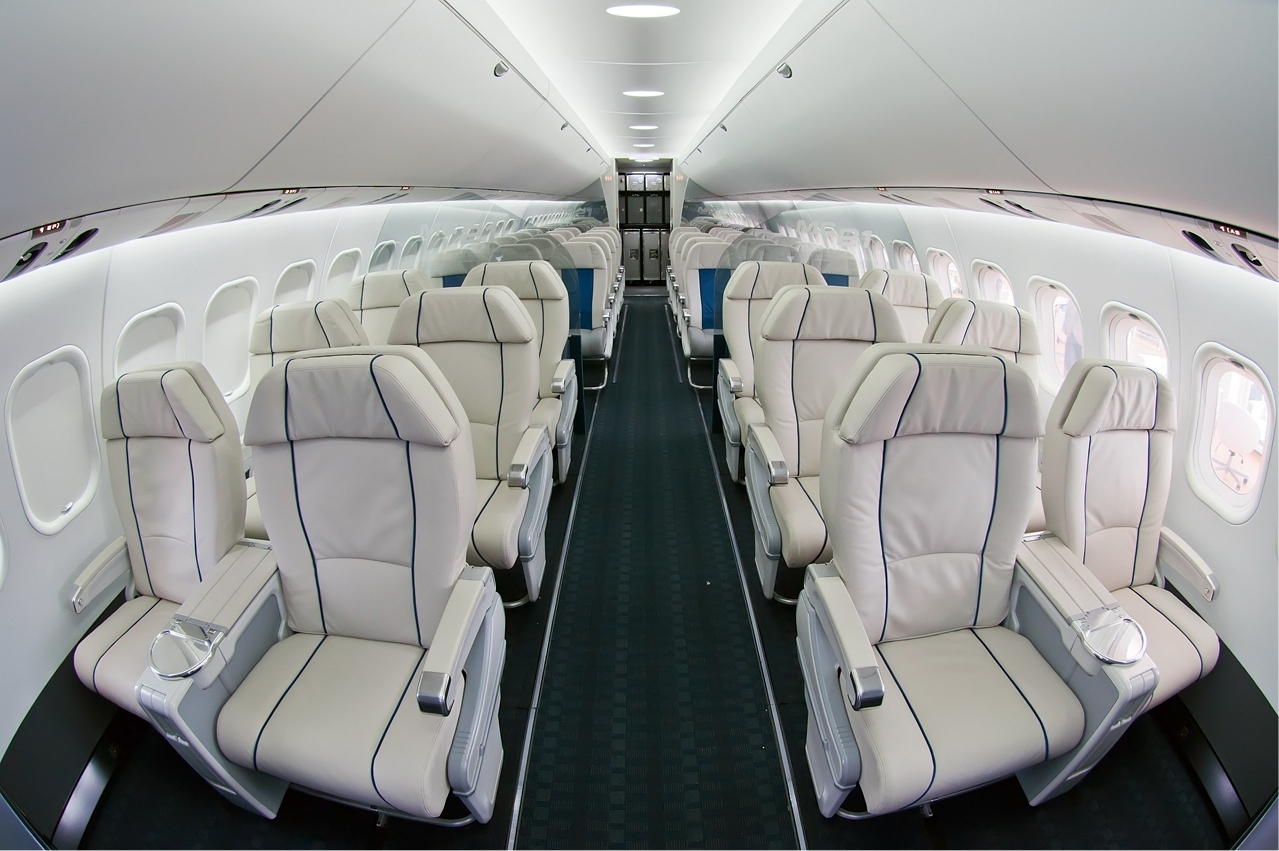
Cabin mock-up in 2011

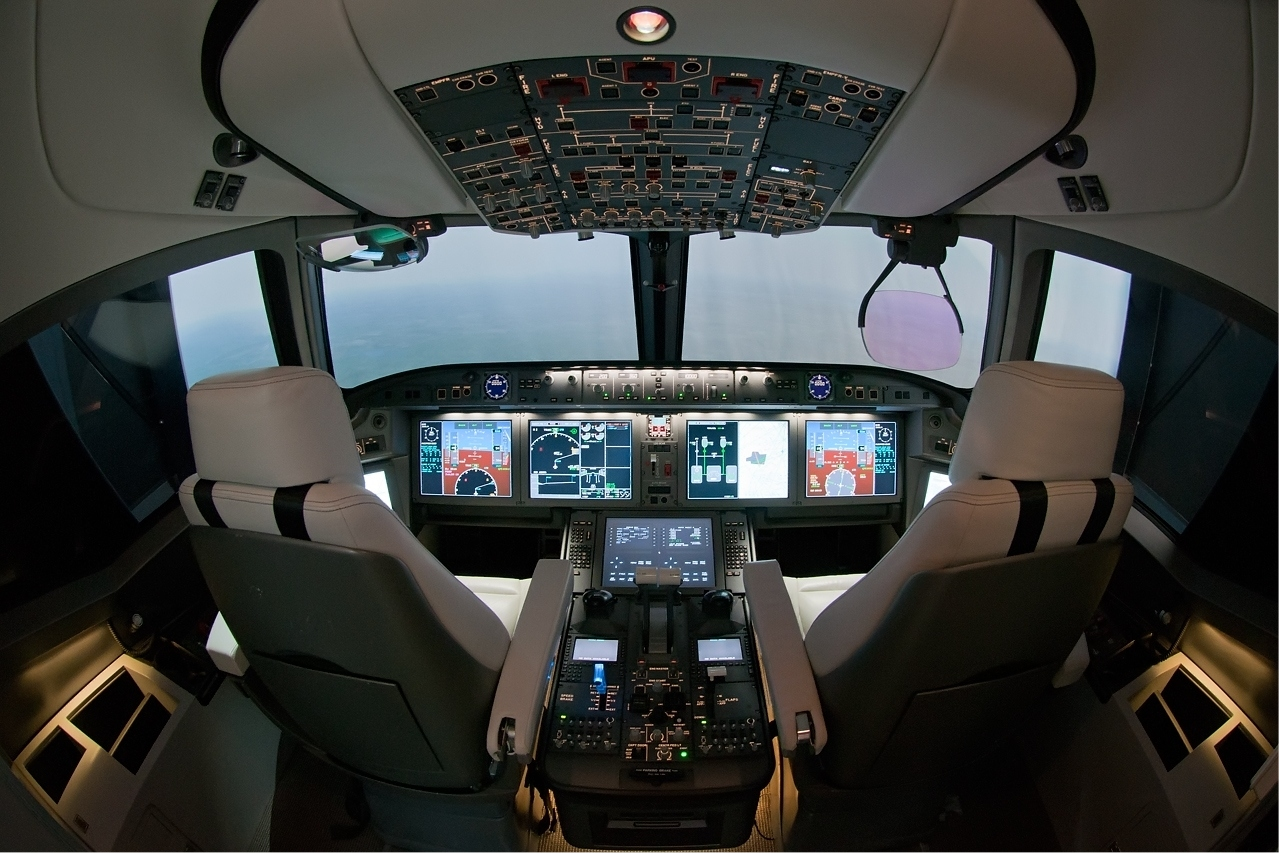
Flight deck mock-up with a HUD

The design is based on the never-released, twin-engine Yakovlev Yak-242 as a development of the three-engine Yakovlev Yak-42.

=== Airframe ===
United Aircraft Corporation (UAC) subsidiary AeroComposit, a Russian firm, developed the vacuum infusion process to produce the wing box and wing panels. The vertical and horizontal fins and wingbox are also composite and the high aspect ratio wing is a supercritical airfoil. The MC-21 design is more innovative than the C919: it is the only airliner with a carbon fibre wing box made with resin infused dry fibre, cured in an oven out of autoclave. The initial design included roughly 33% composite materials, increasing to 40–45% with the composite wing.

By January 2019, U.S. sanctions against Russia had interrupted the supply of foreign raw materials, on which the UAC relied to produce the composite parts. The UAC started looking for either domestically produced or Chinese replacements, maintaining that the wing box and consoles would still consist of polymeric composites. By then, a metal wing was "no longer on the agenda" according to the Central Aerohydrodynamic Institute (TsAGI). In March 2019, AeroComposite reported that it had produced the first fuselage center section and wing box from domestic materials.

AeroComposite a subsidiary of UAC developed and produced an all carbon fibre wing for the MC-21. The fuselage of the MC-21 is mostly made of lightweight aluminium–lithium alloy, which accounts for 40% of the airframe's structural weight. It is 11 cm (4.3 in) wider than the A320/C919 and 27 cm (11 in) wider than the 737, for a 61 cm (24 in) aisle allowing passing others or a trolley. Its 79.25 t (174,700 lb) MTOW is the same as the almost 5 m (16.5 ft.) shorter A320neo and is 3 t (6,600 lb) lighter than the almost 3 m (9.8 ft) shorter 737-8, for similar two-class layouts of 162 to 165, while the 737-8 and A320neo have 200 nmi (370 km; 230 mi) more range. The MC-21-300 has a capacity of 132–163 passengers in a two-class configuration and a capacity of 165–211 in a single class.

=== Engines ===
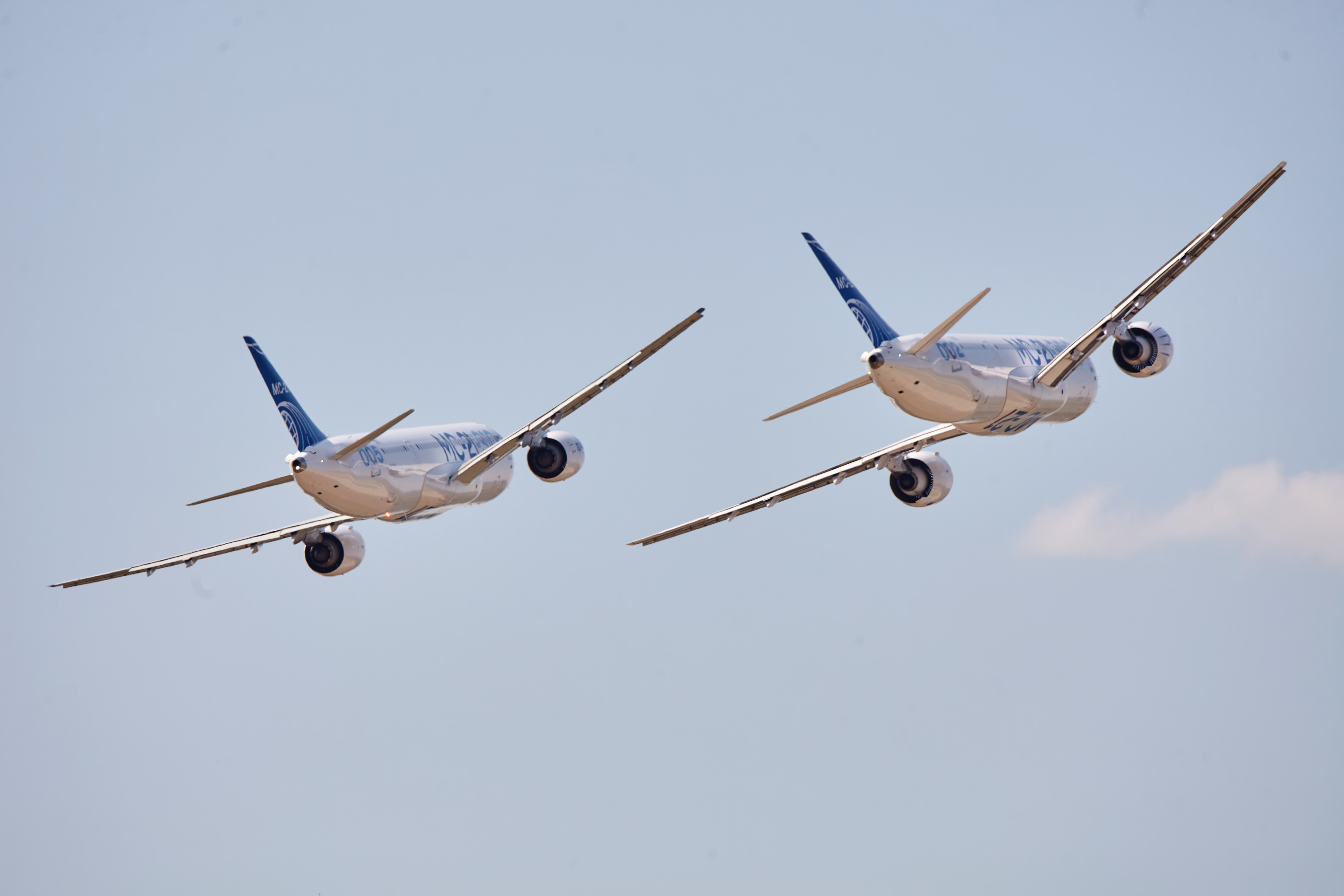
A МС-21-300 powered by PW1400Gs (right) and a МС-21-310 powered by PD-14 engines (left)

==== Pratt & Whitney (development phase) ====
The 130 kN (30,000 lbf) thrust class Pratt & Whitney PW1000G was selected in December 2009. The design configuration at one stage called for the PW1400G-JM geared turbo fan engine to be installed on one version. Russia originally decided to have both an internal and external supplier for the engine and nacelle for greater flexibility in controlling rate and price, but abandoned non-Russian suppliers following sanctions.

==== Aviadvigatel (production engine) ====
The Russian-designed engine used for actual production is the 8–16 tf (18,000–35,000 lbf) Aviadvigatel PD-14. United Engine Corporation (UEC) planned to deliver five PD-14s for the MC-21 by the end of 2018, to start flight tests in 2019 for the MC-21 variant certification in 2021. By October 2018, the PD-14 had received its Rosaviatsia type certification. In October 2019, PD-14 flight-testing on the MC-21 was delayed until 2020. The project conducted at least 100 flight tests after that, but further delays occurred due to sanctions in 2022.

In early 2025, the first batch of mass-produced engines incorporating 16 new technologies was finally delivered to the UAC factory. By July 2025, aircraft No. 73055 had been fitted with PD-14 engines, and the flight-test program commenced A second prototype aircraft with PD-14 engines, serial number 73054, was added to the flight-test program in August 2025.

According to Aerospace Global News, Russian daily newspaper Kommersant said in January 2025 that 24 PD-14 engines were planned to be produced in 2025 but that this was then reduced to seven units for the whole of 2025. Kommersant said that production of the MC-21 would reach a rate of 36 units per year after 2029.

=== Systems ===
==== Pre-sanctions plans for systems ====
In August 2009, Hamilton Sundstrand, a subsidiary of United Technologies (UTC), announced it would provide electric power generation and distribution equipment for $2.3 billion over 20 years of production. Rockwell Collins and its Russian partner Avionika were selected to supply the MC-21's avionics. Honeywell, Thales and Elbit Systems were to supply avionics with nine 12-inch multifunction displays, electronic flight bags, synthetic vision and enhanced vision systems. The MC-21 was planned to be the first airliner with active side-sticks, supplied by UTC Aerospace Systems from Charlotte, North Carolina. It was to have fly-by-wire controls. Its design features a glass cockpit with side-stick controls and an optional head-up display.

Goodrich Corporation, also a subsidiary of United Technologies (now RTX Corporation), along with Aviapribor was initially selected to provide the flight control system actuators. Zodiac Aerospace, Eaton and Meggitt were planned to provide other components. Interior furnishings were planned to come from French company Zodiac Aerospace, coordinated by C&D Zodiac from Huntington Beach, California. Innovations from Zodiac Aerospace, based in Carson, California, were to be incorporated in the water and waste systems.

There were two types of auxiliary power units (APU) designed with specifications suitable for MC-21: the HGT750 from US company Honeywell Aerospace and the TA18-200 developed by the Russian firm Aerosila.

==== Actual production systems ====
For the production phase, the cockpit and part of the aircraft's avionics were developed by the Concern Radio-Electronic Technologies and Rockwell Collins with the participation of personnel from the Russian company Avionika.

Both foreign-made and Russian auxiliary power units can be used in the MC-21: the Russian-made auxiliary power units used for the production phase of the aircraft, the TA18-200 power units, were developed and produced by Aerosila.

=== Component suppliers ===
Initially it was assumed that the share of domestic components for the MC-21 would be 38%, but due to sanctions in the wake of the 2022 Russian invasion of Ukraine the Russian government ordered a target figure of 98% by 2023, making the aircraft independent of imported components.

In July 2021, the first composite wing made from Russian materials was joined with a fuselage. The fuselage was designed and manufactured by Irkut Corporation and Yakovlev Design. The landing gear was supplied by the company Hydromash from Nizhny Novgorod.

For personnel training, the Russian scientific and production company Systems of Complex Simulators developed and manufactured a number of simulators, including the following: a number of flight simulators of different degrees of realism, an emergency procedures simulator, a firefighting simulator, a service simulator, as well as an engineering simulator for the training of technicians.

== Production ==
According to Kyiv Post, certification work was still underway in August 2026, as Yakovlev was working on preparing its first batch of 18 aircraft for production and delivery. According to Frontier India, the first two serial MC-21-310 aircraft had been completed by the end of September 2026, with a third and fourth plane being processed on the assembly line. According to this report, a further set of serial PD-14 engines had been shipped to the Irkutsk Aviation Plant by September 2026.

== Operational history ==
The mostly Russian-produced MC-21-310 with Aviadvigatel PD-14 engines is part of a plan, announced in June 2022, that aimed to bring the proportion of domestically produced aircraft to 80 per cent of the Russian fleet by 2030. In 2022, deliveries of the MC-21 were expected to start in 2024 and reach a delivery rate of 72 aircraft per year by 2029. However, in 2025 Russian newspaper Kommersant said that production of the MC-21 would reach a rate of only 36 units per year, even after 2029.

== Variants ==
In 2009, the MC-21-200 was designed with around 150 passengers in a single-class configuration, to be followed by a 181-seat MC-21-300 and 212-seat MC-21-400 with basic and extended-range models, plus a very-long-range MC-21-200LR.

MC-21-300
Standard model with PW1400G engines, 163 passengers in two classes, up to 211, up to 6,000 km (3,200 nmi; 3,700 mi) range, powered by Pratt & Whitney PW1400G engines. The first flight was made on 28 May 2017; six aircraft were built before sanctions prevented purchase of further PW1400G engines. This variant was not put into commercial service.
MC-21-310
Standard model with Aviadvigatel PD-14 engines. The first flight was made on 15 December 2020. The second aircraft tested in October 2022 was a reengine of a previous MC-21 that had initially been fitted with imported Pratt & Whitney engines. The first production MC-21-310 plane made its maiden flight on 3 August 2026.

=== Proposed variants ===
Initially, a 132-seat MC-21-100 variant was planned but then superseded by the Superjet 100 development. The small variant with a capacity of 130- to 150-seat was proposed with commonality with the Sukhoi Superjet 130.

UAC is said to be considering further development of the MC-21 by 2035. These include: an MC-21-400 with 18-tonne-force [tf] (40,000 lbf) engines for a 105-tonne [t] (231,000 lb) MTOW, ab MC-21-500, an MC-21-600 with 20–25 tf (44,000–55,000 lbf) engines, and an MC-21-700 with 30 tf (66,000 lbf) engines, as well as an MC-21X with a 155 t (342,000 lb) tons MTOW for a 9,000–10,000-kilometre (4,900–5,400 nmi; 5,600–6,200 mi) range. Ilyushin Finance wants an MC-21-400 stretch for up to 256 seats and plans to buy 20 to 60 of them. The 250-passenger MC-21-400 single-aisle twinjet could be jointly produced in the United Arab Emirates.

Variants with PD-14 engines are designated MC-21-310 and MC-21-210.

МС-21-210
Shortened version with 132 passengers in two classes, up to 165, up to 6,400 km (3,500 nmi; 4,000 mi) range, powered by Aviadvigatel PD-14 engines.
МС-21-300LR
Modification of MC-21-300 with increased range up to 12,000 km (6,500 nmi; 7,500 mi) and Aviadvigatel PD-18R engines.
МС-21-400
Lengthened version with a capacity of up to 256 seats in a single-class configuration, to be powered by Aviadvigatel PD-14M engines.
МС-21-400LR
Modification of MC-21-400 with increased range up to 12,000 km (6,500 nmi; 7,500 mi) and Aviadvigatel PD-14R engines.

== Operators ==
=== Orders and deliveries ===
==== Orders ====
By the end of the 2013 MAKS Air Show, there were 175 firm orders including 50 for Rostec subsidiary Aviakapital leased to Aeroflot and 35 more with PD-14 engines for governmental customers, 50 for Ilyushin Finance (10 to be leased to Red Wings Airlines and six to Transaero), 30 for Vnesheconombank Leasing (10 to be leased to UTair Aviation and 6 to Transaero), and 10 for IrAero with an agreement for 20 others leased from Sberbank of Russia, for a potential 195 orders. Transaero went bankrupt in 2015.

In June 2016, Azerbaijan Airlines tentatively signed to lease ten MC-21-300s from Ilyushin Finance. By July 2018, 175 firm orders and nearly 150 intentions had been recorded.

At the 2019 MAKS Air Show, at Zhukovsky International Airport, Moscow, Bek Air signed a letter of intent for ten Irkut MC-21 aircraft, Yakutia Airlines likewise signed for five aircraft and an undisclosed customer for a further five aircraft. Delivery of the new aircraft was expected to be in the second half of 2021.

In the fall of 2022, Russia's largest air carrier, the Aeroflot Group ordered 89 SJ-100 regional jets, 210 MC-21 medium-range jets, and another 40 Tu-214 narrow-body jets. 18 MC-21 and 34 SJ-100 aircraft from Rostec were confirmed later in 2023. But chief executive Sergei Aleksandrovsky suggested the other two types might be dropped, and transfer of the entire fleet to MC-21s. Aeroflot signed a contract for the supply of 90 MC-21 aircraft on 18 September 2026.

Date	Airline	EIS	Orders			
Date	Airline	EIS	MC-21-200	MC-21-300	Options	Total
21 Jul 2010	(Russia) Nordwind Airlines	TBA	—N/a	3	2	5
21 Jul 2010	(Russia) VEB Leasing	TBA	—N/a	30	30	60
1 Sep 2010	(Russia) Aeroflot	2024	—N/a	50	—N/a	50
18 Aug 2011	(Russia) Ilyushin Finance	2024	—N/a	28	22	50
23 Aug 2011	(Russia) Rostec	2024	15	35	35	85
11 Sep 2023	(Russia) Rossiya Airlines	2026	—N/a	12	—N/a	12
16 Sep 2011	(Russia) IrAero	2024	—	10	10	20 (Note: Launch operator through Sberbank of Russia)
27 Aug 2013	(Russia) Utair	TBA	—N/a	10	—N/a	10 (Note: through VEB Leasing)
29 Aug 2013	(Russia) Sberbank Leasing	TBA	—N/a	20	—N/a	20
30 Aug 2013	(Russia) Red Wings Airlines	2024	—N/a	16	—N/a	16 (Note: through Ilyushin Finance)
8 Jun 2016	Azerbaijan Airlines	TBA	—N/a	10	—N/a	10
19 Jul 2017	(Russia) ALROSA	2023	—N/a	3	3	6
Total without duplicates			175			
Letters of Intention signed
30 August 2019	(Russia) Yakutia Airlines	2024	—N/a	5+	—N/a	5
7 Jun 2022	(Russia) Aeroflot	TBA	—N/a	100+	—N/a	100+
30 August 2019	Unknown customer	TBA	—N/a	5	—N/a	5
Total without duplicates			140+			

==== Deliveries ====
Due to the additional work necessary to integrate Russian components into the MC-21-310, the first commercial delivery is planned for 2027.

== Accidents and incidents ==
- On 18 January 2021, an MC-21-300 (prototype 73051) experienced a runway excursion at Zhukovsky Aerodrome and came to a stop in heavy snow during testing. There were no injuries to the crew.

== Specifications ==
MC-21 aircraft family specifications and performance
Variant	MC-21-200	MC-21-300	MC-21-310
Cockpit crew	2		
2-class seats	132 (12J + 120Y)	163 (16J + 147Y)	
1-class seats	165 @ 74–71 cm (29–28 in)	211 @ 74–71 cm (29–28 in)	
Cargo capacity	34 m^{3} (1,200 cu ft) – 5 LD3-45	49 m^{3} (1,700 cu ft) – 9 LD3-45	
Length	36.8 m (121 ft)	42.2 m (138 ft)	
Wingspan	35.9 m (118 ft)		
Height	11.45 m (37.6 ft)		
Fuselage width	4.06 m (13.3 ft)		
Cabin width	3.81 m (12.5 ft)		
Runway length		2,200 m (7,200 ft)	2,410 m (7,910 ft)
Maximum take-off weight	72,560 kg (159,970 lb)	79,250 kg (174,720 lb)	85,000 kg (187,000 lb)
Maximum landing weight	63,100 kg (139,100 lb)	69,100 kg (152,300 lb)	73,500 kg (162,000 lb)
Maximum payload	18,900 kg (41,700 lb)	22,600 kg (49,800 lb)	21,300 kg (47,000 lb)
Fuel capacity	20,400 kg (45,000 lb)		
Turbofans (x2)	Pratt & Whitney PW1000G		Aviadvigatel PD-14
Max. thrust (x2)	PW1428G: 120 kN (28,000 lbf)	PW1431G: 140 kN (31,000 lbf)	PD-14: 140 kN (31,000 lbf)
2-class range	6,400 km (3,500 nmi; 4,000 mi)	6,000 km (3,200 nmi; 3,700 mi)	3,830 km (2,070 nmi; 2,380 mi)

== See also ==
Aircraft of comparable role, configuration, and era

- Airbus A220-300
- Airbus A320neo family
- Boeing 737 MAX
- Comac C919
- Embraer E-Jet E2

Related lists

- List of jet airliners
