= JetOS =

JetOS RTOS
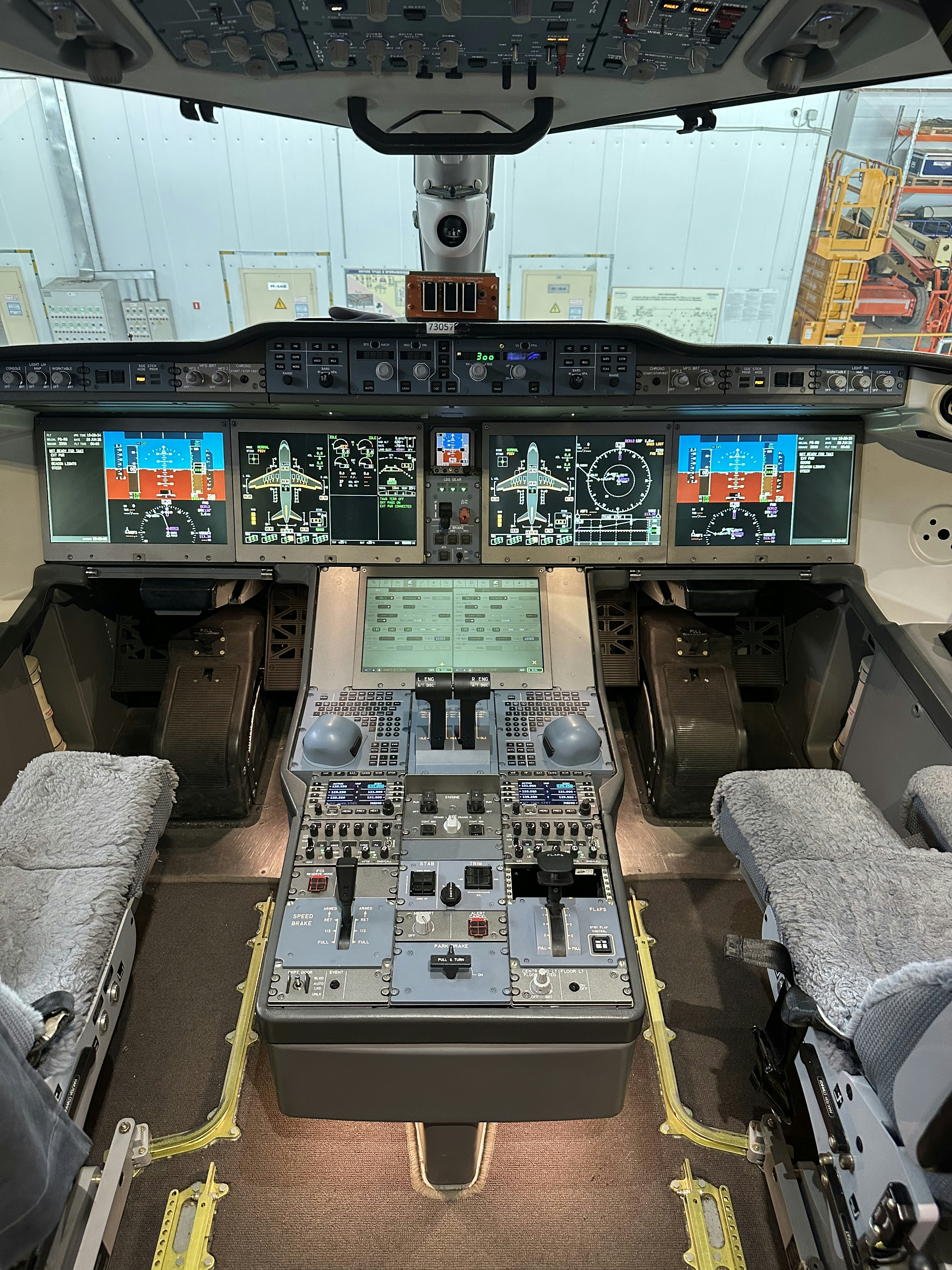
- Yakovlev MC-21 with flight instrumentation powered by JetOS
- Developer: GosNIIAS; Institute for System Programming
- Written in: C
- OS family: Unix-like real-time operating system
- Working state: Current
- Marketing target: Embedded systems
- Available in: English; Russian
- Supported platforms: PowerPC x86 ARM

The JetOS RTOS (Russian: ОСРВ JetOS) is a Unix-like real-time operating system developed by the Russian State Scientific Research Institute of Aviation Systems, the Keldysh Institute of Applied Mathematics, and the Institute for System Programming. JetOS is primarily designed for use in embedded systems for civil aviation, as part of the Russian strategy of import substitution.

JetOS is designed to power avionics systems on commercial aircraft such as the Yakovlev SJ-100 and Yakovlev MC-21, enabling real-time data acquisition, processing and display for control systems, navigation and other flight parameters. The operating systems supports running up to 30 applications to be run during flight, meeting the requirements for DO-178C and ARINC 653.

== History ==
Development of JetOS began in 2016 on order of the Ministry of Industry and Trade as part of import-substitution measures to create an alternative to foreign operating systems such as LynxOS, VxWorks and PikeOS.

The first version of the operating system was operational in 2019, with testing and integration continuing.

== Applications ==
=== Commercial aircraft ===
- Yakovlev SJ-100
- Yakovlev MC-21
- Tupolev Tu-214

== See also ==
- LynxOS
- VxWorks
- PikeOS
