= Institute for System Programming =

Coordinates: 55.7450°N 37.6645°E

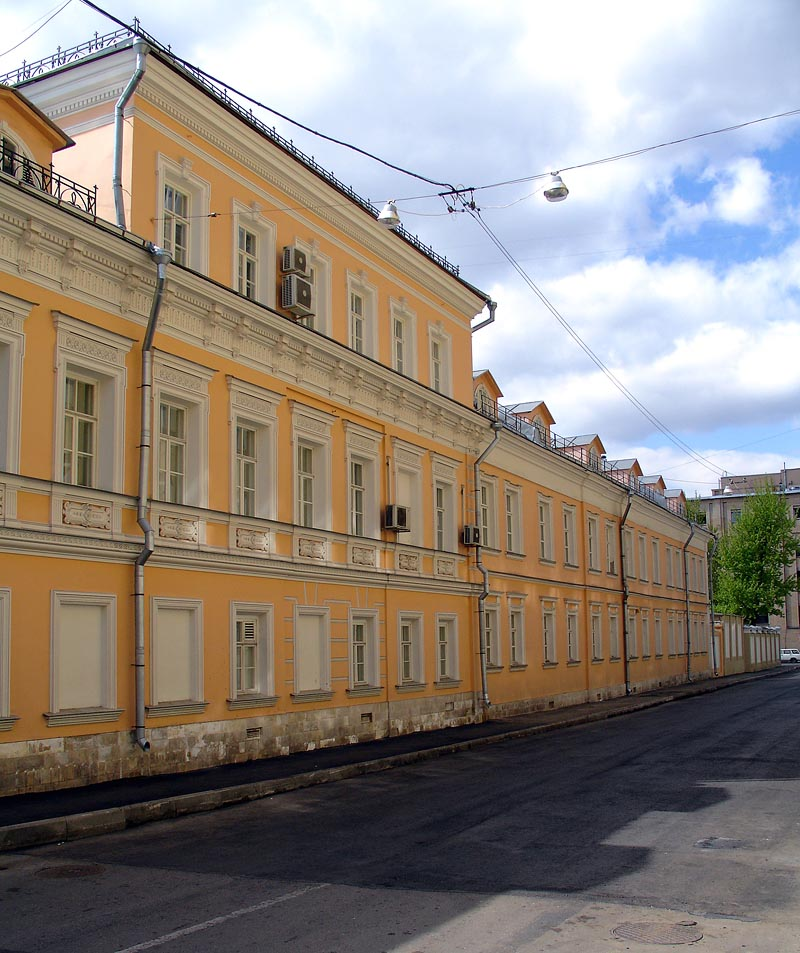
- Established: 1994, based on Institute for Cybernetics Problems
- Research type: Computer Science
- Director: Arutyun Avetisyan

The Institute for System Programming (ISP) of the Russian Academy of Sciences (RAS; Russian: Институт системного программирования) was founded on January 25, 1994, on the base of the departments of System Programming and Numerical Software of the Institute for Cybernetics Problems of the RAS. ISP RAS belongs to the Division of Mathematical Sciences of the RAS.

Since October 2024, the Institute for System Programming has been on the U.S. sanctions list. The institute operates a research center dedicated to the security of the Linux operating system kernel under the auspices of the Federal Service for Technical and Export Control, an agency subordinate to the Ministry of Defense of the Russian Federation; the center also maintains a Russia based branch of the kernel.

== R&D groups ==
Compiler Technologies Department (CTT) : The department is specialized in applying compiler approach to different computer science fields, as well as modern optimizing compiler development and design. The recent research activity of the team is concentrated on parallel programming and reverse engineering.

Computing Systems Architecture Department (CSA) : Organised in 1994. The main directions of the department research activities have been connected with implementation of network architectures and hardware platforms for local and global networks.

Information Systems Department (MODIS) : The main activities of the department: multi-user fully functional relational DBMS, CORBA-based technology for distributed information systems, XML-based technology for heterogeneous data integration, native XML database Sedna, text mining and information retrieval.

Software Development Tools Department : The main direction is creation of tools supporting formal specification and modeling languages and easing the development process.

Software Engineering Department (SE) : The spectrum of the scientific research of the department covers a range of Software Engineering, including analysis of programs and their models, verification and validation, standardization issues including development of open software standards, various aspects of development, maintenance and evolution of software together with methods of education and deployment of advanced technologies.

System Programming Department : Research activities of the department lie in the area of program static analysis, excavation of architecture using program code and visualization of software architecture model, modelling of architecture and code generation using software model.

Theoretical Computer Science Department : The members of the department are specialists in different branches of mathematics and theoretical computer science: combinatorics, complexity of computations, probabilistic methods, mathematical logic, formal methods of program analysis, logical programming, mathematical cryptography.

== Councils ==
Academic council : The main task of the council is coordination of research and scientific programs aimed on prioritization of new important directions.

Dissertation council : Being a part of the Institute Dissertation council D.002.087.01 considers applications for scientific degrees of candidate and doctor of physical and mathematical, and technical sciences according to qualification standard 05.13.11 "Mathematical and program support for computers, their complexes, and networks".

== Centers ==
Verification Center of the Operating System Linux : The mission of the Center is to propagate the Linux platform by ensuring its high reliability and compatibility through the use of open standards and advanced testing and verification technologies.

Center of competence in parallel and distributed computing : The goal of the center is in significant increase of the usage of parallel and distributed computations in the areas of educational, research, and production activities of Russian organizations.
