= Hydromash =

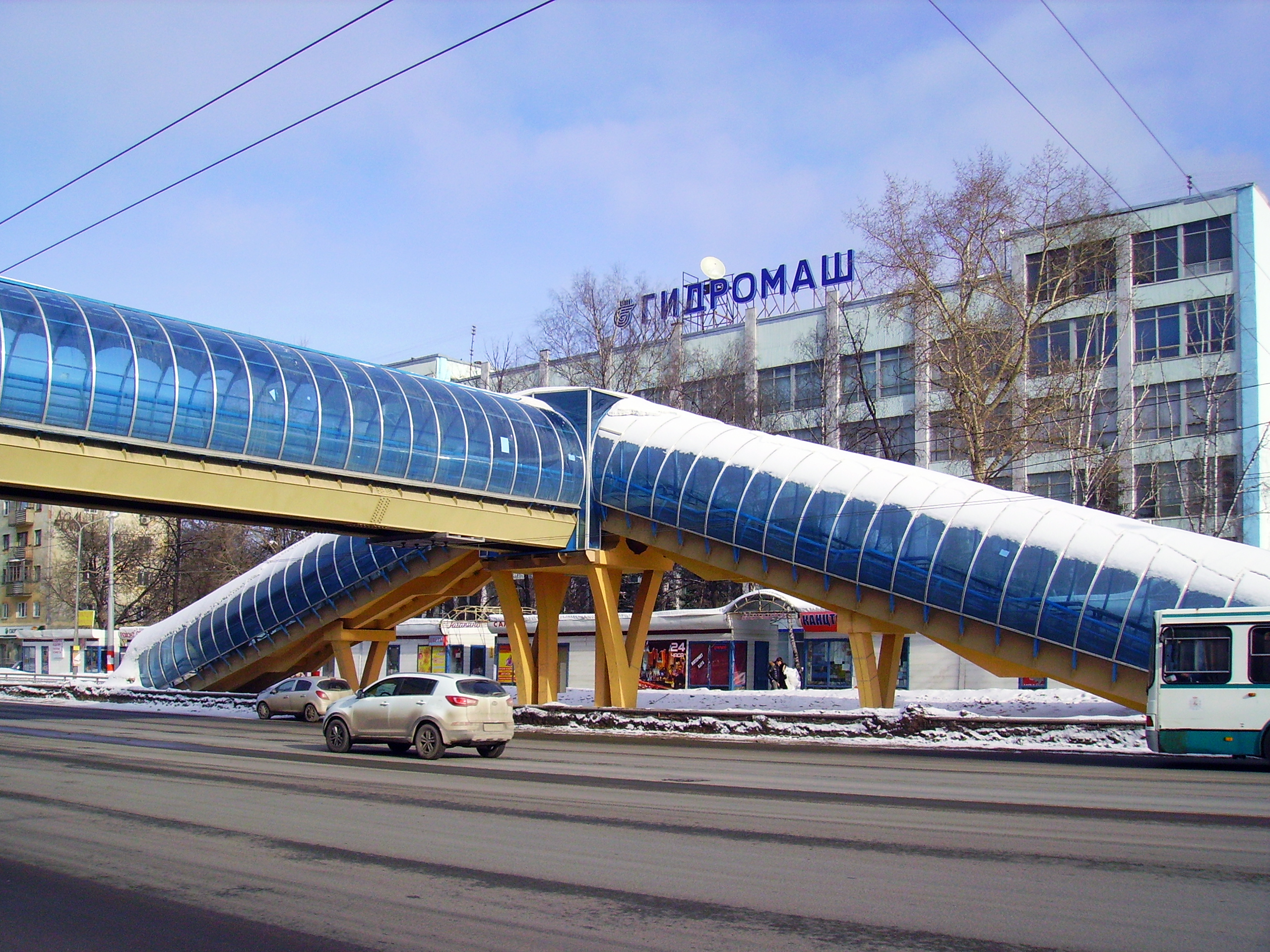
- Company type: Private
- Industry: Aerospace & Defence
- Founded: 1805
- Headquarters: Nizhny Novgorod, Russia
- Products: Civil & military landing gears
- Revenue: $139 million (2017)
- Operating income: $42.7 million (2017)
- Net income: $34.4 million (2017)
- Total assets: $181 million (2017)
- Total equity: $124 million (2017)
- Website: http://www.hydromash.ru/eng/index.htm

Hydromash Joint-stock company (Russian: Гидромаш) is a large Russian firm involved in the design, development, manufacture and customer support of undercarriage and hydraulic units for aircraft landing gear systems.

The company is based in Nizhny Novgorod and designs hydraulic actuators for both civil and military aircraft and helicopters. It established fruitful cooperation with leading Western companies working in this field, such as Liebherr Group of Germany and Messier-Dowty of France.

Hydromash JSC then became involved in various international projects, such as Embraer regional jets, Airbus A320 family airliners, Airbus A330 and Airbus A340 long-haul airliners, as well as the Bombardier Global Express business jet and AgustaWestland AW139 helicopter.

In 2022, the company was included in the "100 Best Enterprises of Russia" list.

== See also ==
- Nizhny Novgorod
