= Out of autoclave composite manufacturing =

Making materials of unlike substances without traditional curing

Out of autoclave composite manufacturing is an alternative to the traditional high pressure autoclave (industrial) curing process commonly used by the aerospace manufacturers for manufacturing composite material. Out of autoclave (OOA) is a process that achieves the same quality as an autoclave but through a different process. OOA curing achieves the desired fiber content and elimination of voids by placing the layup within a closed mold and applying vacuum, pressure, and heat by means other than an autoclave. A resin transfer molding (RTM) press is the typical method of applying heat and pressure to the closed mold. There are several out of autoclave technologies in current use including RTM, same qualified resin transfer molding (SQRTM), vacuum-assisted resin transfer molding (VARTM), and balanced pressure fluid molding. The most advanced of these processes can produce high-tech net shape aircraft components.

== Processes ==
=== Resin transfer molding ===
Resin transfer molding (RTM) is a method of fabricating high-tech composite structures. The RTM process is capable of consistently producing composite parts with high strength, complex geometries, tight dimensional tolerances, and part quality typically required of aerospace applications. RTM uses a closed mold commonly made of aluminum. A fiber "layup" such as graphite is placed into the mold. The mold is closed, sealed, heated, and placed under vacuum. Heated resin is injected into the mold to impregnate the fiber layup. Having the mold heated and under vacuum, as in vacuum assisted resin transfer molding (VARTM) assists the resin flow. The mold is then held at a temperature sufficient to cure the resin. Current RTM technology produces lightweight parts with excellent mechanical properties. With these qualities, composite materials are gaining wide use in a variety of structural and non-structural applications common in aerospace and aviation. RTM is one method of fabricating these composite structures.

=== Same qualified resin transfer molding ===
Same qualified resin transfer molding (SQRTM) is a closed mold composites manufacturing method similar to RTM. "Same qualified" refers to this method injecting the same resin as that used in the prepreg layup. The attributes of "same qualified" are significant to a manufacturer because those who adopt this process need not re-qualify resin materials for their production process. What sets SQRTM apart from standard resin transfer molding is the substitution of a prepreg layup rather than a dry fiber preform.

SQRTM is an RTM process adapted to prepreg technology. The prepreg is placed in a closed mold and during the cure cycle, a small amount of resin is injected into the cavity through ports positioned around the part. This resin does not go into the laminate, but only presses up against the edge of the laminate in order to establish hydrostatic pressure on the prepreg, similar to the goal of autoclave curing. This pressure is similar to the autoclave, on the order of 6-7 bars (90-100 psi). Hydrostatic pressure minimizes voids by keeping dissolved air, water and resin monomers in solution in the resin. The tool can either be self-clamped and self-heated or heated and clamped by a press. The equipment is composed of a tool, a press, an injector, and a vacuum pump.

The key factors in the SQRTM process include precision machined closed mold tooling, high pressure presses, a high vacuum applied to the tool interior, and precise control of heating platens, injected resin volume, heat, and pressure.

The advantages of the SQRTM process include a high level of integration, tight tolerances and the use of qualified prepregs. Its disadvantages include higher tool costs and a lower level of flexibility to design changes.

=== Vacuum assisted resin transfer molding ===
Vacuum assisted resin transfer molding (VARTM) differs from pre-preg processing in that fiber reinforcements and core materials are laid up on a one-sided mold and vacuum bagged. Liquid resin is introduced through ports in the mold and vacuum-drawn through the reinforcements by way of designed-in channels and infusion media that facilitate fiber wetout. Subsequent curing does not require high heat or high pressure, unlike the autoclave. The process's comparatively low-cost tooling allows inexpensive production of large, complex parts in one shot, such as the tail of the Mitsubishi SpaceJet.

=== Balanced pressure fluid molding ===
Balanced pressure molding using fluid as the heat transfer is commercially practiced as the 'quickstep' process. This process allows for the curing, partial curing, and joining of composite materials. The process involves a fluid-filled, pressure balanced, heated floating mould technology. The heated floating mold technology used within the process works by rapidly applying heat to the laminate which is trapped between a free floating rigid or semi-rigid mold that floats in, and is surrounded by, a heat transfer fluid (HTF). The rapid heating can lead to significantly lower resin viscosities, and this in turn allows achieving full laminate consolidation using pressures lower than those used in autoclave. The mold and laminate become separated from the circulating HTF by a flexible membrane. The part, typically under full vacuum, is subject to pressures as high as 250kPa fluid pressure and can be rapidly heated to the desired cure temperature without risk of catastrophic exothermic reaction, as the HTF can draw excess heat as desired. The air is then removed under vacuum and the laminate is compacted and heated until the part is cured.

A flexible membrane beneath the mold is bonded into a pressure chamber creating the lower half of a 'clamshell' or 'chamber' like mold set. A second flexible membrane is bonded to a second pressure chamber creating the upper half of the clamshell. These pressure chambers are clamped together during processing, permitting the laminate to be compressed while reducing stress to the mold as it is floating in a balanced pressure environment within the HTF.

The process can use thermosetting, thermoplastic prepregs (pre-impregnated composite fibers), and wet resin with dry fiber to produce superior composite parts. This out of autoclave process can achieve aerospace grade void contents of less than 2%, with extremely fast cycle times, and at significantly lower pressures and lower labor costs than many alternative autoclave production systems using many typical autoclave qualified prepregs. The quickstep out of autoclave system is unique in that it uses fully immersed balanced pressure fluid curing and it allows the user to stop the composite cure reaction at any point in the cure cycle, and thus can halt processing on all or part of the laminate and either return to it at a later to complete cure or to co-cure, join and bond other composites to it to create larger parts.

The use of fluid to control temperature, as opposed to the gas generally used within methods such as autoclave and oven curing equates to lower energy consumption, faster cycle times and extremely accurate part temperature control.

=== Prepreg compression molding ===
Another out of autoclave method for achieving external compression on prepreg based composite parts is through the use of heat shrink tape. This method, however, does not achieve the high quality of RTM or autoclave processes because without the autoclave or a closed mold, the part must be cured in a non-pressurized oven. These compression tapes are typically made from polyester (PET) film. Heat shrink tape is applied to a composite part prior to the heating, or curing cycle. When heated, the tape will shrink in the linear (machine direction). Heat shrink tape works best on parts that are cylindrical or semi-circular in cross section, as this allows the tape to exert even compaction forces on the part surface. Examples would be composite tubes for aerospace, wind energy, consumer sporting goods, etc. Heat shrink tape allows these parts to be processed without the need to cure with the heat and pressure of an autoclave.

== Bibliography ==
- Robert M. Jones (1999). Mechanics of Composite Materials (2nd ed.). Taylor & Francis. ISBN 9781560327127.
- Autar K. Kaw (2005). Mechanics of Composite Materials (2nd ed.). CRC. ISBN 0-8493-1343-0.
- Hollaway, Leonard, ed. (1994). Handbook of polymer composites for engineers. Cambridge: Woodhead Publishing. ISBN 978-1-85573-129-5. OL 12000916M.
- Matthews, F.L. & Rawlings, R.D. (1999). Composite Materials: Engineering and Science. Boca Raton: CRC Press. ISBN 0-8493-0621-3.
