= State Scientific Research Institute of Aviation Systems =

Russian research centre

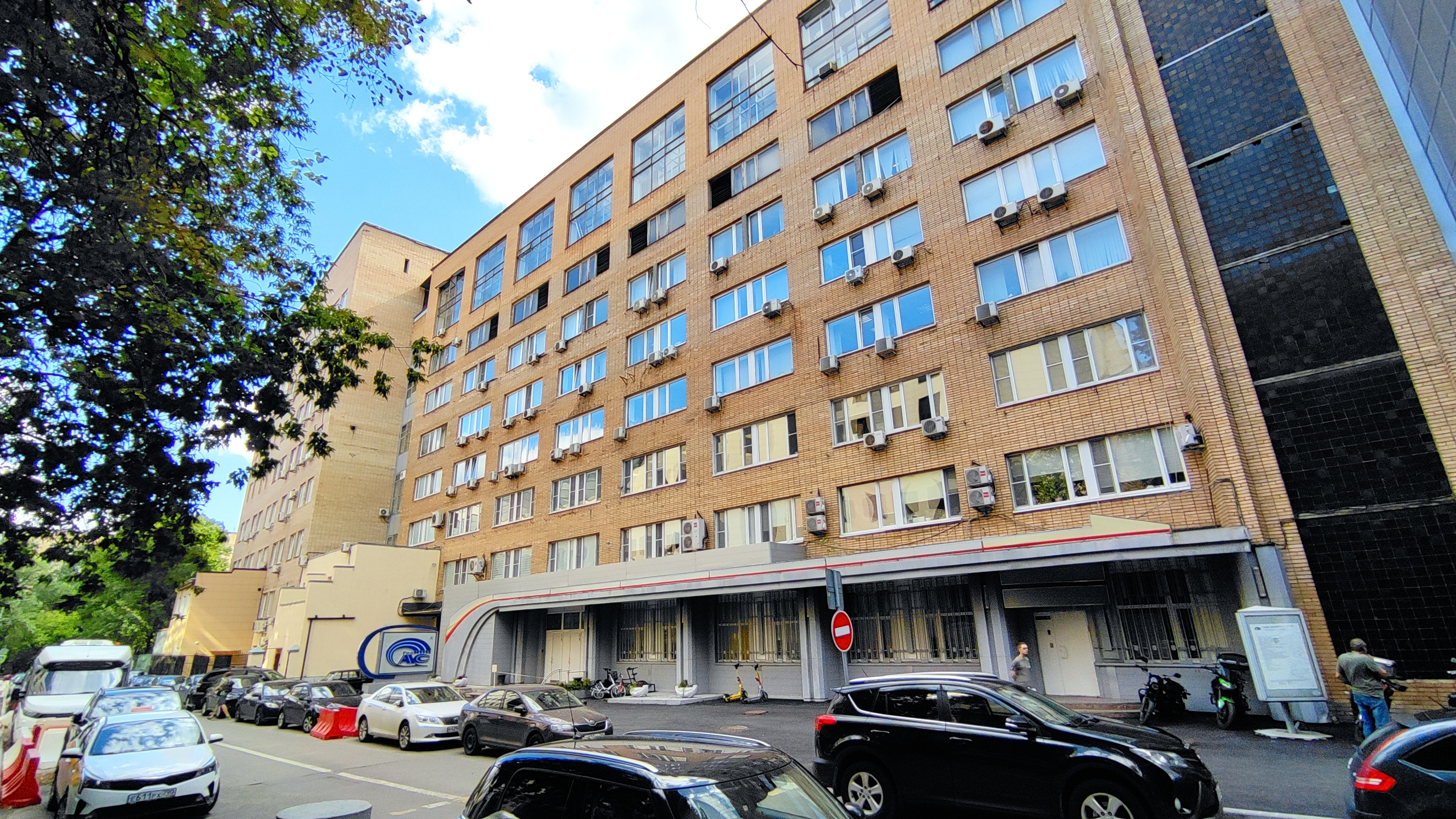
- Native name: Государственный научно-исследовательский институт авиационных систем
- Type: federal autonomous agency
- Industry: aerospace
- Founded: 1946; 80 years ago
- Headquarters: Moscow, Russia
- Area served: Europe and Asia
- Key people: Sergey Khokhlov, Director General; Sergey Zheltov, Executive Director; Evgeny A. Fedosov, Research Adviser
- Owner: Russian Federation
- Parent: National Research Center Zhukovsky Institute
- Website: www.gosniias.ru/index-e.htm

State Scientific Research Institute of Aviation Systems or GosNIIAS for short (Russian: ГосНИИАС) is a Russian aerospace research centre. Founded by the decree of the Council of Ministers of the USSR on 26 February 1946 from a number of laboratories of the Flight Research Institute for operations research and aviation weapons systems development. The new institute was named NII-2. In March 1994 the institute was re-named with its current name (GosNIIAS).

Initially, the institute was located in the buildings of the former Sergievo-Elizabethan Asylum.

In GosNIIAS, there are six basic departments leading students and graduate students from three universities:

- Department FUPM MIPT “Avionics. Control and Information Systems. Organized in 1969, head. the department - academician E. A. Fedosov.
- Department MAI “System design of air complexes”. Organized in 1969, head. the department - doctor of technical sciences V. A. Stefanov.
- Department MAI "External design and efficiency of aviation complexes". Organized in 1973, head. Department - Doctor of Technical Sciences A. M. Zherebin.
- Department MAI "Systems of automatic and intelligent control." Organized in 1942, head. Department - Academician of the Russian Academy of Sciences S. Y. Zheltov.
- Department MIREA "Aviation and space information processing and control systems". Organized in 2002, head. Department - Corresponding Member of the Russian Academy of Sciences G. G. Sebryakov.
- Department MIREA "Avionics". Organized in 1988, head. Department - Academician of the Russian Academy of Sciences E. A. Fedosov.

== Bibliography ==
- List of GosNIIAS publications in the Scientific electronic library elibrary.ru
