= Vacuum assisted resin transfer molding =

Resin molding process

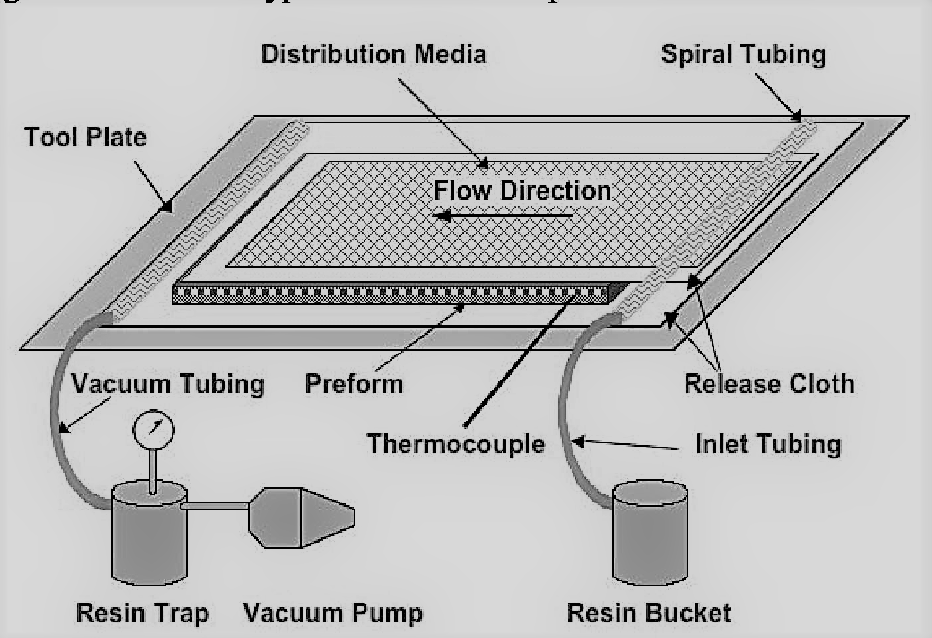
Vacuum-assisted resin transfer molding diagram

Vacuum Assisted Resin Transfer Molding (VARTM) or Vacuum Injected Molding (VIM) is a closed mold, out of autoclave (OOA) composite manufacturing process. VARTM is a variation of Resin Transfer Molding (RTM) with its distinguishing characteristic being the replacement of the top portion of a mold tool with a vacuum bag and the use of a vacuum to assist in resin flow. The process involves the use of a vacuum to facilitate resin flow into a fiber layup contained within a mold tool covered by a vacuum bag. After the impregnation occurs the composite part is allowed to cure at room temperature with an optional post cure sometimes carried out.

== Process ==
Typically, this process uses a low viscosity (100 to 1000 cP) polyester or vinyl ester resin along with fiberglass fibers to create a composite. Normally the process is capable of producing composites with a fiber volume fraction between 40 and 50%. The resin to fiber ratio is important for determining the overall strength and performance of the final part, with mechanical strength being most influenced by the type of fiber reinforcement. The type of resin used will primarily determine the corrosion resistance, heat distortion temperature, and surface finish. Resins used in this process must have low viscosities due to the limited pressure differential provided by the vacuum pump. High performance fibers, such as carbon fiber, can also be used. However, their usage is less common and is mainly for the fabrication of high end parts.

== Air leakages ==
For VARTM to create high quality composite parts it is crucial that air leakages are avoided. Air leakages can cause resin to improperly flow through the mold and also lead to the formation of air bubbles. Defects in the form of voids occur when the composite cures with air bubbles inside of it. Air leakage can be caused by a defect in the vacuum bag, an improper application of the sealant tape, or an improper seal at the points where the hose meets the vacuum bag.

Air leakages can be detected using various methods. In some situations air bubbles, and consequentially air leakages can be detected simply through a visual inspection of the composite. The most simple ‘Leak isolation’ method involves monitoring the vacuum pressure level to determine if there are air leaks. If the vacuum pressure level does not decrease after vacuuming all of the air out of the mold, then it can be determined that there is no air leakages. However, if there was a drop in the vacuum pressure level it would be an indication that there was an air leakage. Unfortunately, this method for identifying the presence of an air leak does not determine the air leak's location.

Sound magnification is also utilized to locate leaks. Since air leaks make noise, this method utilizes a microphone to amplify sound to a set of speakers or headphones to help in the identification of leaks. This allows a user to detect an air leak and use the microphone to help them find the location of the leak. Unfortunately, this method is ineffective in noisy environments.

Heated air can also be utilized to detect leaks. In this method heated air is forced through the mold prior to the use of a vacuum pump. If there are any air leaks in the process's set up the hot air will be expelled through the leak. An infrared detector, can then be used to determine if there are any heat releases on the surface of vacuum bag, which would be an indication of the presence of an air leak.

== VARTM vs RTM ==
Both VARTM and RTM are closed mold processes where pressure is used to inject resin into the mold. There are few differences in the materials used in VARTM vs RTM, with the resin and fiber basically being the same for both processes. Therefore, if factors such as fiber to resin ratio and cross-sectional fiber distribution were held constant for each process, the molded part performances would be similar.

RTM has a fiber preform placed between mold halves, while VARTM uses the bottom part of the mold tool and a vacuum bag with resin flow caused by the use of a vacuum. RTM results in small-medium-sized parts that can also be complex in shape, while VARTM can also create very large parts. VARTM also advantageously has lower equipment costs than RTM. The single sided nature of the VARTM mold has the drawback of only allowing for one side of the composite to have an A-class finish. However, parts can be manufactured with an A-class finish on both sides with RTM due it having both a top and bottom mold.

== Advantages and applications ==
This process offers the benefit of not requiring an expensive autoclave while also being capable of producing large, complex aerospace-grade parts. Products produced using this method vary widely in their application with parts being used in transportation, wind energy, marine, infrastructure, and aerospace applications. The process's ability to create large and complex parts has allowed it to effectively reduce manufacturing costs when utilized to produce parts that are traditionally constructed of numerous small components. For instance, LOCKHEED Martin Space Systems (LMSS) experienced a manufacturing cost saving of up to 75% when it began to produce the quarter section of the equipment bay for the Trident II D5 missile using VARTM.
