= Specific impulse =

Change in velocity per amount of fuel

Specific impulse (usually abbreviated as I_{sp}) is a physical quantity defined as the ratio of change in momentum (impulse) to the mass used, usually fuel. It typically uses units of metres per second (a SI unit) or feet per second (in imperial units). It is equivalent to thrust (a force, in newtons or pounds) per mass flow rate (in kg/s or lbm/s).

It serves as a measure of how efficiently an engine, such as a rocket or jet engine, generates thrust from propellant. I_{sp} is the effective exhaust velocity used in the Tsiolkovsky rocket equation which calculates how much a vehicle's velocity can be changed with a given quantity of fuel.

Normalized specific impulse is the ratio of specific impulse to Earth's standard acceleration of gravity, g (in m/s^{2} or ft/s^{2}). It is measured in seconds, and conveniently is the same number in both SI and imperial units. It can be understood as the time that one kilogram of fuel can produce one kilogram-force of thrust, which is equal to the time that one pound-mass of fuel can produce one pound-force of thrust.

== Overview ==
Reaction engines, such as rockets and jet engines propel a vehicle by expelling mass in one direction, which pushes the vehicle in the other direction according to Newton's third law of motion. This expelled mass is called the reaction mass. An engine can push harder if it expels the reaction mass at a higher exhaust velocity $v_e$, or expels mass at a faster rate, $\frac{\mathrm{d} m}{\mathrm{d} t}$.

Assuming that the engine expels mass at a constant exhaust velocity $v_\text{e}$, the thrust is
$$T = v_\text{e} \frac{\mathrm{d} m}{\mathrm{d} t}.$$

If this is integrated over time, the result is the total change in momentum. Dividing by the mass shows that the specific impulse is equal to the exhaust velocity. In practice, the specific impulse is usually lower than the actual physical exhaust velocity due to inefficiencies in the rocket, and thus corresponds to an "effective" exhaust velocity.

The specific impulse $I_\text{sp}$ in units of velocity is defined by
$$T_\text{avg} = I_\text{sp} \frac{\mathrm{d} m}{\mathrm{d} t},$$
where $T_\text{avg}$ is the average thrust.

=== Types of engines ===
The practical meaning of the measurement varies with different types of engines. Car engines consume onboard fuel, breathe environmental air to burn the fuel, and push against the ground beneath them. There is no reaction mass. In this case, I_{sp} is momentum per fuel burned.

Chemical rocket engines, by contrast, carry their fuel, oxidizer, and reaction mass with them, so I_{sp} is momentum per reaction mass.

Airplane engines are in the middle, as they only push against airflow through the engine. Some of this reaction mass is carried with them, and some is breathed from the air. Therefore, "specific impulse" could be taken to mean either "per reaction mass", as with a rocket, or "per fuel burned" as with cars. The latter is the traditional and more common choice. Because of these differences, specific impulse is not directly comparable between different types of engines.

Specific impulse can be taken as a measure of efficiency. In cars and planes, it typically corresponds with fuel efficiency, i.e. the distance travelled per unit mass or volume of fuel. In rocketry, it corresponds to the achievable delta-v, which is the typical way to measure changes between orbits, via the Tsiolkovsky rocket equation
$$\Delta v = I_\text{sp} \ln \frac{m_0}{m_\text{f}},$$
where $I_\text{sp}$ is the specific impulse measured in units of velocity, and $m_0, m_\text{f}$ are the initial and final masses of the rocket. The difference between $m_0$ and $m_\text{f}$ is the reaction mass that was expelled.

== Propulsion systems ==
=== Rockets ===
For any chemical rocket engine, the momentum transfer efficiency depends heavily on the effectiveness of the nozzle. The nozzle is the primary means of converting reactant energy (e.g. thermal or pressure energy) into a flow of momentum moving the same direction. Nozzle shape and effectiveness have a great impact on total momentum transfer from the reaction mass to the rocket.

The efficiency of the conversion of input energy to reactant energy also affects I_{sp}, either thermal energy in combustion engines or electrical energy in ion engines. This efficiency determines the amount of delta-v a rocket can perform with a given load of fuel. Optimizing the tradeoffs between fuel quantity and specific impulse is one of the fundamental engineering challenges in rocketry.

Although the specific impulse has units of velocity, it almost never corresponds to an actual physical velocity. In chemical and cold gas rockets, the shape of the nozzle has a high impact on the energy-to-momentum conversion. There are other sources of losses and inefficiencies as well, such as the details of the chemical combustion in such engines. The physical exhaust velocity is higher than the "effective exhaust velocity", which is the "velocity" of the specific impulse. The momentum exchanged and the mass used to generate it are physically real measurements. Typically, rocket nozzles work better when the ambient pressure is lower, such as in space versus in the atmosphere. Engines are typically described by a sea-level I_{sp}, and a vacuum I_{sp}, which is higher. Ion engines, however, do not use a nozzle, although they have other sources of losses so that the momentum transferred is lower than the physical exhaust velocity of their reaction mass.

It is common to express specific impulse as the product of two numbers: a characteristic velocity $c^*$, which summarizes combustion-chamber performance into a quantity with units of speed, and a thrust coefficient $C_F$, which is a dimensionless quantity that summarizes nozzle performance. An additional factor of $g_0$ is a units conversion.
$$I_\text{sp} = \frac{c^* \cdot C_F}{g_0}.$$

==== Units of seconds ====
In rocketry, the specific impulse is often reported in seconds instead of effective exhaust velocity of an engine (m/s), by dividing through standard gravity $g_0$:
$$I_\text{sp} = \frac{v_e}{g_0} = \frac{F}{\dot{m}\cdot g_0}.$$
This is convenient when using gravitational force units (kgf or lbf), since I_{sp} then expresses the amount of thrust per unit propellant flow (kg/s or lb/s). Representing specific impulse in units of time also has the advantage of being agnostic between imperial and SI units:
$$I_\text{sp}\text{[s]} = \Bigl(\frac{F\text{[kgf]}}{\dot{m}\text{[kg/s]}}\Bigr) = \Bigl(\frac{F\text{[lbf]}}{\dot{m}\text{[lb/s]}}\Bigr).$$

Physically, I_{sp} measured in seconds is the amount of time a rocket engine can generate thrust, given a quantity of propellant whose weight (under g_{0}) is equal to the engine's thrust. It is the length of time that the engine can produce 1 kgf (or 1 lbf) of thrust from 1 kg (or 1 lb) of propellant.

=== Cars ===
Although the car industry almost never uses specific impulse on any practical level, the measure can be defined, and makes good contrast against other engine types. Car engines breathe external air to combust their fuel, and (via the wheels) react against the ground. The only meaningful way to interpret "specific impulse" is as "thrust per fuelflow", although one must also specify if the force is measured at the crankshaft or at the wheels, since there are transmission losses. Such a measure corresponds to fuel mileage.

=== Airplanes ===
In an aerodynamic context, there are similarities to both cars and rockets. Like cars, airplane engines breathe outside air; unlike cars they react only against fluids flowing through the engine (including the propellers as applicable). There are several possible ways to interpret "specific impulse": as thrust per fuel flow, as thrust per breathing-flow, or as thrust per "turbine-flow" (i.e. excluding air though the propeller/bypass fan). Since the air breathed is not a direct cost, with wide engineering leeway on how much to breathe, the industry traditionally chooses the "thrust per fuel flow" interpretation with its focus on cost efficiency. In this interpretation, the resulting specific impulse numbers are much higher than for rocket engines, although this comparison is quite different — one is with and the other is without reaction mass. It exemplifies the advantage an airplane engine has over a rocket due to not having to carry the air it uses.

As with all kinds of engines, there are many engineering choices and tradeoffs that affect specific impulse. Nonlinear air resistance and the engine's inability to keep a high specific impulse at a fast burn rate are limiting factors to the fuel consumption rate.

As with rocket engines, the interpretation of specific impulse as a "velocity" does not actually correspond to the physical exhaust velocity. Since the usual interpretation excludes much of the reaction mass, the physical velocity of the reactants downstream is much lower than the effective exhaust velocity suggested from the I_{sp}.

== General considerations ==
Specific impulse should not be confused with energy efficiency, which can decrease as specific impulse increases, since propulsion systems that give high specific impulse require high energy to do so.

Specific impulse should not be confused with total thrust. Thrust is the force supplied by the engine and depends on the propellant mass flow through the engine. Specific impulse measures the thrust per propellant mass flow. Thrust and specific impulse are related by the design and propellants of the engine in question, but this relationship is tenuous: in most cases, high thrust and high specific impulse are mutually exclusive engineering goals. For example, LH_{2}/LO_{2} bipropellant produces higher I_{sp} (due to higher chemical energy and lower exhaust molecular mass) but lower thrust than RP-1/LO_{2} (due to higher density and propellant flow). In many cases, propulsion systems with very high specific impulse—some ion thrusters reach 25–35 times better I_{sp} than chemical engines—produce correspondingly low thrust.

When calculating specific impulse, only propellant carried with the vehicle before use is counted, in the standard interpretation. This usage best corresponds to the cost of operating the vehicle. For a chemical rocket, unlike a plane or car, the propellant mass therefore would include both fuel and oxidizer. For any vehicle, optimizing for specific impulse is generally not the same as optimizing for total performance or total cost. In rocketry, a heavier engine with a higher specific impulse may not be as effective in gaining altitude, distance, or velocity as a lighter engine with a lower specific impulse, especially if the latter engine possesses a higher thrust-to-weight ratio. This is a significant reason for most rocket designs having multiple stages. The first stage can optimized for high thrust to effectively fight gravity drag and air drag, while the later stages operating strictly in orbit and in vacuum can be more easily optimized for higher specific impulse, especially for high delta-v orbits.

=== Propellant quantity units ===
The amount of propellant could be defined either in units of mass or weight. If mass is used, specific impulse is an impulse per unit of mass, which dimensional analysis shows to be equivalent to units of speed; this interpretation is commonly labeled the effective exhaust velocity. If a force-based unit system is used, impulse is divided by propellant weight (weight is a measure of force), resulting in units of time. The problem with weight, as a measure of quantity, is that it depends on the acceleration applied to the propellant, which is arbitrary with no relation to the design of the engine. Historically, standard gravity was the reference conversion between weight and mass. But since technology has progressed to the point that we can measure Earth gravity's variation across the surface, and where such differences can cause differences in practical engineering projects (not to mention science projects on other solar bodies), modern science and engineering focus on mass as the measure of quantity, so as to remove the acceleration dependence. Measuring specific impulse by propellant mass gives it the same meaning for a car at sea level, an airplane at cruising altitude, or a helicopter on Mars.

No matter the choice of mass or weight, the resulting quotient of "velocity" or "time" usually doesn't correspond directly to an actual velocity or time. Due to various losses in real engines, the actual exhaust velocity is different from the I_{sp} "velocity" (and for cars there isn't even a sensible definition of "actual exhaust velocity"). Rather, the specific impulse is just that: a physical momentum from a physical quantity of propellant (be that in mass or weight).

== Units ==
Various equivalent rocket motor performance measurements, in SI and US customary units
	Specific impulse		Effective exhaust velocity	Specific fuel consumption
	By weight*	By mass	Effective exhaust velocity	Specific fuel consumption
SI	= x s	= 9.80665·x N·s/kg	= 9.80665·x m/s	= 101,972/x g/(kN·s)
US customary units	= x s	= x lbf·s/lb	= 32.17405·x ft/s	= 3,600/x lb/(lbf·h)
*as mentioned below, x s·g_{0} would be physically correct

The most common unit for specific impulse is the second, as values are identical regardless of whether the calculations are done in SI, imperial, or US customary units. Nearly all manufacturers quote their engine performance in seconds, and the unit is also useful for specifying aircraft engine performance.

The use of metres per second to specify effective exhaust velocity is also reasonably common. The unit is intuitive when describing rocket engines, although the effective exhaust speed of the engines may be significantly different from the actual exhaust speed, especially in gas-generator cycle engines. For airbreathing jet engines, the effective exhaust velocity does not account for the mass of the air used (as the air is taken in from the environment), although it can still be used for comparison purposes.

Metres per second are numerically equivalent to newton-seconds per kg (N·s/kg), and SI measurements of specific impulse can be written in terms of either units interchangeably. This unit highlights the definition of specific impulse as impulse per unit mass of propellant.

Specific fuel consumption is inversely proportional to specific impulse and has units of g/(kN·s) or lb/(lbf·h). Specific fuel consumption is used extensively for describing the performance of air-breathing jet engines.

=== Specific impulse in seconds ===
Specific impulse, measured in seconds, can be thought of as how many seconds one kilogram of fuel can produce one kilogram-force of thrust. Or, more precisely, how many seconds a given propellant, when paired with a given engine, can accelerate its own initial mass at 1 g. The longer it can accelerate its own mass, the more delta-V it delivers to the whole system.

In other words, given a particular engine and a mass of a particular propellant, specific impulse measures for how long a time that engine can exert a continuous force (thrust) until fully burning that mass of propellant. A given mass of a more energy-dense propellant can burn for a longer duration than some less energy-dense propellant made to exert the same force while burning in an engine. Different engine designs burning the same propellant may not be equally efficient at directing their propellant's energy into effective thrust.

For all vehicles, specific impulse (impulse per unit weight-on-Earth of propellant) in seconds can be defined by the following equation:

$$I_{sp} = \frac{F_{avg}}{\dot{m} \cdot g_{0}}$$
Where:

- $I_\text{sp}$ is the specific impulse (seconds),
- $F_{avg}$ is the average thrust (newtons, kilograms-force or pounds-force),
- $\dot m$ is the mass flow rate of the propellant (kg/s or slugs/s),
- $g_0$ is the standard gravity (defined as 9.80665 m/s^{2}, which is about 32.17405 ft/s^{2}).

$$I_{sp} = \frac{I_{total}}{m \cdot g_{0}}$$
Where:

- $I_\text{sp}$ is the specific impulse (seconds),
- $I_{total}$ is the total impulse (newton-seconds, kg⋅m/s or lbf⋅s),
- $m$ is the mass of the used propellant (kilograms or pounds),
- $g_0$ is the standard gravity (defined as 9.80665 m/s^{2}, which is about 32.17405 ft/s^{2}).

I_{sp} in seconds is the amount of time a rocket engine can generate thrust, given a quantity of propellant the weight of which is equal to the engine's thrust.

The advantage of this formulation is that it may be used for rockets, where all the reaction mass is carried on board, as well as airplanes, where most of the reaction mass is taken from the atmosphere. In addition, giving the result as a unit of time makes the result easily comparable between calculations in SI units, imperial units, US customary units or other unit framework.

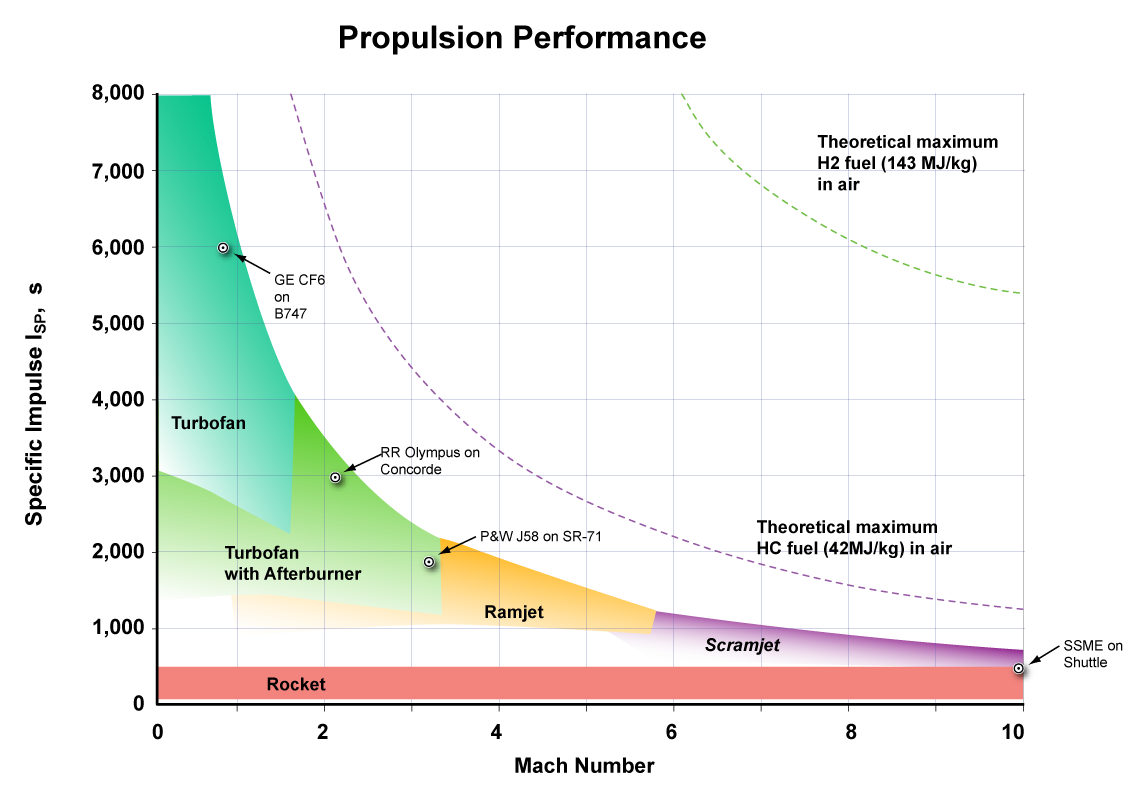
The specific impulse of various jet engines (SSME is the Space Shuttle Main Engine)

==== Imperial units conversion ====
The English unit pound mass is more commonly used than the slug, and when using pounds per second for mass flow rate, it is more convenient to express standard gravity as 1 pound-force per pound-mass. Note that this is equivalent to 32.17405 ft/s^{2}, but expressed in more convenient units. This gives:

$$F_\text{thrust} = I_\text{sp} \cdot \dot m \cdot \left(1 \mathrm{\frac{lbf}{lbm}} \right).$$

==== Rocketry ====
In rocketry, the only reaction mass is the propellant, so the specific impulse is calculated using an alternative method, giving results with units of seconds. Specific impulse is defined as the thrust integrated over time per unit weight-on-Earth of the propellant:

$$I_\text{sp} = \frac{v_\text{e}}{g_0},$$

where

- $I_\text{sp}$ is the specific impulse measured in seconds,
- $v_\text{e}$ is the average exhaust speed along the axis of the engine (in m/s or ft/s),
- $g_0$ is the standard gravity (in m/s^{2} or ft/s^{2}).

In rockets, due to atmospheric effects, the specific impulse varies with altitude, reaching a maximum in a vacuum. This is because the exhaust velocity is not simply a function of the chamber pressure, but is a function of the difference between the interior and exterior of the combustion chamber. Values are usually given for operation at sea level ("sl") or in a vacuum ("vac").

=== Specific impulse as effective exhaust velocity ===
Because of the geocentric factor of g_{0} in the equation for specific impulse, many prefer an alternative definition. The specific impulse of a rocket can be defined in terms of thrust per unit mass flow of propellant. This is an equally valid (and in some ways somewhat simpler) way of defining the effectiveness of a rocket propellant. For a rocket, the specific impulse defined in this way is simply the effective exhaust velocity relative to the rocket, v_{e}. "In actual rocket nozzles, the exhaust velocity is not really uniform over the entire exit cross section and such velocity profiles are difficult to measure accurately. A uniform axial velocity, v_{e}, is assumed for all calculations which employ one-dimensional problem descriptions. This effective exhaust velocity represents an average or mass equivalent velocity at which propellant is being ejected from the rocket vehicle." The two definitions of specific impulse are proportional to one another, and related to each other by:
$$v_\text{e} = g_0 \cdot I_\text{sp},$$
where

- $I_\text{sp}$ is the specific impulse in seconds,
- $v_\text{e}$ is the specific impulse measured in m/s, which is the same as the effective exhaust velocity measured in m/s (or ft/s if g is in ft/s^{2}),
- $g_0$ is the standard gravity, 9.80665 m/s^{2} (in United States customary units 32.174 ft/s^{2}).

This equation is also valid for air-breathing jet engines, but is rarely used in practice.

(Note that different symbols are sometimes used; for example, c is also sometimes seen for exhaust velocity. While the symbol $I_\text{sp}$ might logically be used for specific impulse in units of (N·s^{3})/(m·kg); to avoid confusion, it is desirable to reserve this for specific impulse measured in seconds.)

It is related to the thrust, or forward force on the rocket by the equation:
$$F_\text{thrust} = v_\text{e} \cdot \dot m,$$
where $\dot m$ is the propellant mass flow rate, which is the rate of decrease of the vehicle's mass.

A rocket must carry all its propellant with it, so the mass of the unburned propellant must be accelerated along with the rocket itself. Minimizing the mass of propellant required to achieve a given change in velocity is crucial to building effective rockets. The Tsiolkovsky rocket equation shows that for a rocket with a given empty mass and a given amount of propellant, the total change in velocity it can accomplish is proportional to the effective exhaust velocity.

A spacecraft without propulsion follows an orbit determined by its trajectory and any gravitational field. Deviations from the corresponding velocity pattern (these are called Δv) are achieved by sending exhaust mass in the direction opposite to that of the desired velocity change.

=== Actual exhaust speed versus effective exhaust speed ===
When an engine is run within the atmosphere, the exhaust velocity is reduced by atmospheric pressure, in turn reducing specific impulse. This is a reduction in the effective exhaust velocity, versus the actual exhaust velocity achieved in vacuum conditions. In the case of gas-generator cycle rocket engines, more than one exhaust gas stream is present as turbopump exhaust gas exits through a separate nozzle. Calculating the effective exhaust velocity requires averaging the two mass flows as well as accounting for any atmospheric pressure.

For air-breathing jet engines, particularly turbofans, the actual exhaust velocity and the effective exhaust velocity are different by orders of magnitude. This happens for several reasons. First, a good deal of additional momentum is obtained by using air as reaction mass, such that combustion products in the exhaust have more mass than the burned fuel. Next, inert gases in the atmosphere absorb heat from combustion, and through the resulting expansion provide additional thrust. Lastly, for turbofans and other designs there is even more thrust created by pushing against intake air which never sees combustion directly. These all combine to allow a better match between the airspeed and the exhaust speed, which saves energy/propellant and enormously increases the effective exhaust velocity while reducing the actual exhaust velocity. Again, this is because the mass of the air is not counted in the specific impulse calculation, thus attributing all of the thrust momentum to the mass of the fuel component of the exhaust, and omitting the reaction mass, inert gas, and effect of driven fans on overall engine efficiency from consideration.

Essentially, the momentum of engine exhaust includes a lot more than just fuel, but specific impulse calculation ignores everything but the fuel. Even though the effective exhaust velocity for an air-breathing engine seems nonsensical in the context of actual exhaust velocity, this is still useful for comparing absolute fuel efficiency of different engines.

=== Density specific impulse ===
A related measure, the density specific impulse, sometimes also referred to as Density Impulse and usually abbreviated as I_{s}d is the product of the average specific gravity of a given propellant mixture and the specific impulse. While less important than the specific impulse, it is an important measure in launch vehicle design, as a low density specific impulse implies that bigger tanks will be required to store the propellant, which in turn will have a detrimental effect on the launch vehicle's mass ratio.

=== Specific fuel consumption ===
Specific impulse is inversely proportional to specific fuel consumption (SFC) by the relationship I_{sp} = 1/(g_{o}·SFC) for SFC in kg/(N·s) and I_{sp} = 3600/SFC for SFC in lb/(lbf·hr).

== Examples ==
Rocket engines in vacuum
Model	Type	First run	Application	TSFC		I_{sp} (by weight)	I_{sp} (by mass)
Model	Type	First run	Application	lb/lbf·h	g/kN·s	s	m/s
Avio P80	solid fuel	2006	Vega stage 1	13	360	280	2700
Avio Zefiro 23	solid fuel	2006	Vega stage 2	12.52	354.7	287.5	2819
Avio Zefiro 9A	solid fuel	2008	Vega stage 3	12.20	345.4	295.2	2895
Merlin 1D	liquid fuel	2013	Falcon 9	12	330	310	3000
RD-843	liquid fuel	2012	Vega upper stage	11.41	323.2	315.5	3094
Kuznetsov NK-33	liquid fuel	1970s	N-1F, Soyuz-2-1v stage 1	10.9	308	331	3250
NPO Energomash RD-171M	liquid fuel	1985	Zenit-2M, -3SL, -3SLB, -3F stage 1	10.7	303	337	3300
LE-7A	cryogenic	2001	H-IIA, H-IIB stage 1	8.22	233	438	4300
Snecma HM-7B	cryogenic	1979	Ariane 2, 3, 4, 5 ECA upper stage	8.097	229.4	444.6	4360
LE-5B-2	cryogenic	2009	H-IIA, H-IIB upper stage	8.05	228	447	4380
Aerojet Rocketdyne RS-25	cryogenic	1981	Space Shuttle, SLS stage 1	7.95	225	453	4440
Aerojet Rocketdyne RL-10B-2	cryogenic	1998	Delta III, Delta IV, SLS upper stage	7.734	219.1	465.5	4565
NERVA NRX A6	nuclear	1967				869	

Jet engines with Reheat, static, sea level
Model	Type	First run	Application	TSFC		I_{sp} (by weight)	I_{sp} (by mass)
Model	Type	First run	Application	lb/lbf·h	g/kN·s	s	m/s
Turbo-Union RB.199	turbofan		Tornado	2.5	70.8	1440	14120
GE F101-GE-102	turbofan	1970s	B-1B	2.46	70	1460	14400
Tumansky R-25-300	turbojet		MIG-21bis	2.206	62.5	1632	16000
GE J85-GE-21	turbojet		F-5E/F	2.13	60.3	1690	16570
GE F110-GE-132	turbofan		F-16E/F	2.09	59.2	1722	16890
Honeywell/ITEC F125	turbofan		F-CK-1	2.06	58.4	1748	17140
Snecma M53-P2	turbofan		Mirage 2000C/D/N	2.05	58.1	1756	17220
Snecma Atar 09C	turbojet		Mirage III	2.03	57.5	1770	17400
Snecma Atar 09K-50	turbojet		Mirage IV, 50, F1	1.991	56.4	1808	17730
GE J79-GE-15	turbojet		F-4E/EJ/F/G, RF-4E	1.965	55.7	1832	17970
Saturn AL-31F	turbofan		Su-27/P/K	1.96	55.5	1837	18010
GE F110-GE-129	turbofan		F-16C/D, F-15EX	1.9	53.8	1895	18580
Soloviev D-30F6	turbofan		MiG-31, S-37/Su-47	1.863	52.8	1932	18950
Lyulka AL-21F-3	turbojet		Su-17, Su-22	1.86	52.7	1935	18980
Klimov RD-33	turbofan	1974	MiG-29	1.85	52.4	1946	19080
Saturn AL-41F-1S	turbofan		Su-35S/T-10BM	1.819	51.5	1979	19410
Volvo RM12	turbofan	1978	Gripen A/B/C/D	1.78	50.4	2022	19830
GE F404-GE-402	turbofan		F/A-18C/D	1.74	49	2070	20300
Kuznetsov NK-32	turbofan	1980	Tu-144LL, Tu-160	1.7	48	2100	21000
Snecma M88-2	turbofan	1989	Rafale	1.663	47.11	2165	21230
Eurojet EJ200	turbofan	1991	Eurofighter	1.66–1.73	47–49	2080–2170	20400–21300

Dry jet engines, static, sea level
Model	Type	First run	Application	TSFC		I_{sp} (by weight)	I_{sp} (by mass)
Model	Type	First run	Application	lb/lbf·h	g/kN·s	s	m/s
GE J85-GE-21	turbojet		F-5E/F	1.24	35.1	2900	28500
Snecma Atar 09C	turbojet		Mirage III	1.01	28.6	3560	35000
Snecma Atar 09K-50	turbojet		Mirage IV, 50, F1	0.981	27.8	3670	36000
Snecma Atar 08K-50	turbojet		Super Étendard	0.971	27.5	3710	36400
Tumansky R-25-300	turbojet		MIG-21bis	0.961	27.2	3750	36700
Lyulka AL-21F-3	turbojet		Su-17, Su-22	0.86	24.4	4190	41100
GE J79-GE-15	turbojet		F-4E/EJ/F/G, RF-4E	0.85	24.1	4240	41500
Snecma M53-P2	turbofan		Mirage 2000C/D/N	0.85	24.1	4240	41500
Volvo RM12	turbofan	1978	Gripen A/B/C/D	0.824	23.3	4370	42800
RR Turbomeca Adour	turbofan	1999	Jaguar retrofit	0.81	23	4400	44000
Honeywell/ITEC F124	turbofan	1979	L-159, X-45	0.81	22.9	4440	43600
Honeywell/ITEC F125	turbofan		F-CK-1	0.8	22.7	4500	44100
PW J52-P-408	turbojet		A-4M/N, TA-4KU, EA-6B	0.79	22.4	4560	44700
Saturn AL-41F-1S	turbofan		Su-35S/T-10BM	0.79	22.4	4560	44700
Snecma M88-2	turbofan	1989	Rafale	0.782	22.14	4600	45100
Klimov RD-33	turbofan	1974	MiG-29	0.77	21.8	4680	45800
RR Pegasus 11-61	turbofan		AV-8B+	0.76	21.5	4740	46500
Eurojet EJ200	turbofan	1991	Eurofighter	0.74–0.81	21–23	4400–4900	44000–48000
GE F414-GE-400	turbofan	1993	F/A-18E/F	0.724	20.5	4970	48800
Kuznetsov NK-32	turbofan	1980	Tu-144LL, Tu-160	0.72-0.73	20–21	4900–5000	48000–49000
Soloviev D-30F6	turbofan		MiG-31, S-37/Su-47	0.716	20.3	5030	49300
Snecma Larzac	turbofan	1972	Alpha Jet	0.716	20.3	5030	49300
IHI F3	turbofan	1981	Kawasaki T-4	0.7	19.8	5140	50400
Saturn AL-31F	turbofan		Su-27 /P/K	0.666-0.78	18.9–22.1	4620–5410	45300–53000
RR Spey RB.168	turbofan		AMX	0.66	18.7	5450	53500
GE F110-GE-129	turbofan		F-16C/D, F-15	0.64	18	5600	55000
GE F110-GE-132	turbofan		F-16E/F	0.64	18	5600	55000
Turbo-Union RB.199	turbofan		Tornado ECR	0.637	18.0	5650	55400
PW F119-PW-100	turbofan	1992	F-22	0.61	17.3	5900	57900
Turbo-Union RB.199	turbofan		Tornado	0.598	16.9	6020	59000
GE F101-GE-102	turbofan	1970s	B-1B	0.562	15.9	6410	62800
PW TF33-P-3	turbofan		B-52H, NB-52H	0.52	14.7	6920	67900
RR AE 3007H	turbofan		RQ-4, MQ-4C	0.39	11.0	9200	91000
GE F118-GE-100	turbofan	1980s	B-2	0.375	10.6	9600	94000
GE F118-GE-101	turbofan	1980s	U-2S	0.375	10.6	9600	94000
General Electric CF6-50C2	turbofan		A300, DC-10-30	0.371	10.5	9700	95000
GE TF34-GE-100	turbofan		A-10	0.37	10.5	9700	95000
CFM CFM56-2B1	turbofan		C-135, RC-135	0.36	10	10000	98000
Progress D-18T	turbofan	1980	An-124, An-225	0.345	9.8	10400	102000
PW F117-PW-100	turbofan		C-17	0.34	9.6	10600	104000
PW PW2040	turbofan		Boeing 757	0.33	9.3	10900	107000
CFM CFM56-3C1	turbofan		737 Classic	0.33	9.3	11000	110000
GE CF6-80C2	turbofan		744, 767, MD-11, A300/310, C-5M	0.307-0.344	8.7–9.7	10500–11700	103000–115000
EA GP7270	turbofan		A380-861	0.299	8.5	12000	118000
GE GE90-85B	turbofan		777-200/200ER/300	0.298	8.44	12080	118500
GE GE90-94B	turbofan		777-200/200ER/300	0.2974	8.42	12100	118700
RR Trent 970-84	turbofan	2003	A380-841	0.295	8.36	12200	119700
GE GEnx-1B70	turbofan		787-8	0.2845	8.06	12650	124100
RR Trent 1000C	turbofan	2006	787-9	0.273	7.7	13200	129000

Jet engines, cruise
Model	Type	First run	Application	TSFC		I_{sp} (by weight)	I_{sp} (by mass)
Model	Type	First run	Application	lb/lbf·h	g/kN·s	s	m/s
	Ramjet		Mach 1	4.5	130	800	7800
J-58	turbojet	1958	SR-71 at Mach 3.2 (Reheat)	1.9	53.8	1895	18580
RR/Snecma Olympus	turbojet	1966	Concorde at Mach 2	1.195	33.8	3010	29500
PW JT8D-9	turbofan		737 Original	0.8	22.7	4500	44100
Honeywell ALF502R-5	GTF		BAe 146	0.72	20.4	5000	49000
Soloviev D-30KP-2	turbofan		Il-76, Il-78	0.715	20.3	5030	49400
Soloviev D-30KU-154	turbofan		Tu-154M	0.705	20.0	5110	50100
RR Tay RB.183	turbofan	1984	Fokker 70, Fokker 100	0.69	19.5	5220	51200
GE CF34-3	turbofan	1982	Challenger, CRJ100/200	0.69	19.5	5220	51200
GE CF34-8E	turbofan		E170/175	0.68	19.3	5290	51900
Honeywell TFE731-60	GTF		Falcon 900	0.679	19.2	5300	52000
CFM CFM56-2C1	turbofan		DC-8 Super 70	0.671	19.0	5370	52600
GE CF34-8C	turbofan		CRJ700/900/1000	0.67-0.68	19–19	5300–5400	52000–53000
CFM CFM56-3C1	turbofan		737 Classic	0.667	18.9	5400	52900
CFM CFM56-2A2	turbofan	1974	E-3, E-6	0.66	18.7	5450	53500
RR BR725	turbofan	2008	G650/ER	0.657	18.6	5480	53700
CFM CFM56-2B1	turbofan		C-135, RC-135	0.65	18.4	5540	54300
GE CF34-10A	turbofan		ARJ21	0.65	18.4	5540	54300
CFE CFE738-1-1B	turbofan	1990	Falcon 2000	0.645	18.3	5580	54700
RR BR710	turbofan	1995	G. V/G550, Global Express	0.64	18	5600	55000
GE CF34-10E	turbofan		E190/195	0.64	18	5600	55000
General Electric CF6-50C2	turbofan		A300B2/B4/C4/F4, DC-10-30	0.63	17.8	5710	56000
PowerJet SaM146	turbofan		Superjet LR	0.629	17.8	5720	56100
CFM CFM56-7B24	turbofan		737 NG	0.627	17.8	5740	56300
RR BR715	turbofan	1997	717	0.62	17.6	5810	56900
GE CF6-80C2-B1F	turbofan		747-400	0.605	17.1	5950	58400
CFM CFM56-5A1	turbofan		A320	0.596	16.9	6040	59200
Aviadvigatel PS-90A1	turbofan		Il-96-400	0.595	16.9	6050	59300
PW PW2040	turbofan		757-200	0.582	16.5	6190	60700
PW PW4098	turbofan		777-300	0.581	16.5	6200	60800
GE CF6-80C2-B2	turbofan		767	0.576	16.3	6250	61300
IAE V2525-D5	turbofan		MD-90	0.574	16.3	6270	61500
IAE V2533-A5	turbofan		A321-231	0.574	16.3	6270	61500
RR Trent 700	turbofan	1992	A330	0.562	15.9	6410	62800
RR Trent 800	turbofan	1993	777-200/200ER/300	0.560	15.9	6430	63000
Progress D-18T	turbofan	1980	An-124, An-225	0.546	15.5	6590	64700
CFM CFM56-5B4	turbofan		A320-214	0.545	15.4	6610	64800
CFM CFM56-5C2	turbofan		A340-211	0.545	15.4	6610	64800
RR Trent 500	turbofan	1999	A340-500/600	0.542	15.4	6640	65100
CFM LEAP-1B	turbofan	2014	737 MAX	0.53-0.56	15–16	6400–6800	63000–67000
Aviadvigatel PD-14	turbofan	2014	MC-21-310	0.526	14.9	6840	67100
RR Trent 900	turbofan	2003	A380	0.522	14.8	6900	67600
GE GE90-85B	turbofan		777-200/200ER	0.52	14.7	6920	67900
GE GEnx-1B76	turbofan	2006	787-10	0.512	14.5	7030	69000
PW PW1400G	GTF		MC-21	0.51	14.4	7100	69000
CFM LEAP-1C	turbofan	2013	C919	0.51	14.4	7100	69000
CFM LEAP-1A	turbofan	2013	A320neo family	0.51	14.4	7100	69000
RR Trent 7000	turbofan	2015	A330neo	0.506 (Note: 10% better than Trent 700)	14.3	7110	69800
RR Trent 1000	turbofan	2006	787	0.506 (Note: 10% better than Trent 700)	14.3	7110	69800
RR Trent XWB-97	turbofan	2014	A350-1000	0.478 (Note: 15 per cent fuel consumption advantage over the original Trent engine)	13.5	7530	73900
PW 1127G	GTF	2012	A320neo	0.463	13.1	7780	76300

Specific impulse of various propulsion technologies
Engine	Effective exhaust velocity (m/s)	Specific impulse (s)	Exhaust specific energy (MJ/kg)
Turbofan jet engine (actual V is ~300 m/s)	29,000	3,000	Approx. 0.05
Space Shuttle Solid Rocket Booster	2,500	250	3
Liquid oxygen–liquid hydrogen	4,400	450	9.7
NSTAR electrostatic xenon ion thruster	20,000–30,000	1,950–3,100	
NEXT electrostatic xenon ion thruster	40,000	1,320–4,170	
VASIMR predictions	30,000–120,000	3,000–12,000	1,400
DS4G electrostatic ion thruster	210,000	21,400	22,500
Ideal photonic rocket (Note: A hypothetical device doing perfect conversion of mass to photons emitted perfectly aligned so as to be antiparallel to the desired thrust vector. This represents the theoretical upper limit for propulsion relying strictly on onboard fuel and the rocket principle.)	299,792,458	30,570,000	89,875,517,874

An example of a specific impulse measured in time is 453 seconds, which is equivalent to an effective exhaust velocity of 4.440 km/s (14,570 ft/s), for the RS-25 engines when operating in a vacuum. An air-breathing jet engine typically has a much larger specific impulse than a rocket; for example a turbofan jet engine may have a specific impulse of 6,000 seconds or more at sea level whereas a rocket would be between 200 and 400 seconds.

An air-breathing engine is thus much more propellant efficient than a rocket engine, because the air serves as reaction mass and oxidizer for combustion which does not have to be carried as propellant, and the actual exhaust speed is much lower, so the kinetic energy the exhaust carries away is lower and thus the jet engine uses far less energy to generate thrust. While the actual exhaust velocity is lower for air-breathing engines, the effective exhaust velocity is very high for jet engines. This is because the effective exhaust velocity calculation assumes that the carried propellant is providing all the reaction mass and all the thrust. Hence effective exhaust velocity is not physically meaningful for air-breathing engines; nevertheless, it is useful for comparison with other types of engines.

The highest specific impulse for a chemical propellant ever test-fired in a rocket engine was 542 seconds (5.32 km/s) with a tripropellant of lithium, fluorine, and hydrogen. However, this combination is impractical. Lithium and fluorine are both extremely corrosive, lithium ignites on contact with air, fluorine ignites on contact with most fuels, and hydrogen, while not hypergolic, is an explosive hazard. Fluorine and the hydrogen fluoride (HF) in the exhaust are very toxic, which damages the environment, makes work around the launch pad difficult, and makes getting a launch license that much more difficult. The rocket exhaust is also ionized, which would interfere with radio communication with the rocket.

Nuclear thermal rocket engines differ from conventional rocket engines in that energy is supplied to the propellants by an external nuclear heat source instead of the heat of combustion. The nuclear rocket typically operates by passing liquid hydrogen gas through an operating nuclear reactor. Testing in the 1960s yielded specific impulses of about 850 seconds (8,340 m/s), about twice that of the Space Shuttle engines.

A variety of other rocket propulsion methods, such as ion thrusters, give much higher specific impulse but with much lower thrust; for example the Hall-effect thruster on the SMART-1 satellite has a specific impulse of 1,640 s (16.1 km/s) but a maximum thrust of only 68 mN (0.015 lbf). The variable specific impulse magnetoplasma rocket (VASIMR) engine currently in development will theoretically yield 20 to 300 km/s (66,000 to 984,000 ft/s), and a maximum thrust of 5.7 N (1.3 lbf).

== See also ==
- Delta-v (physics)
- Energy density
- Heating value
- Impulse
- Jet engine
- Liquid rocket propellant
- Rocket propellant
- Specific energy
- Specific thrust—thrust per unit of air for a duct engine
- Standard gravity
- System-specific impulse
- Thrust specific fuel consumption—fuel consumption per unit thrust
- Tsiolkovsky rocket equation
