= Thrust-specific fuel consumption =

Fuel efficiency of an engine design with respect to thrust output

Thrust-specific fuel consumption (TSFC) is the fuel efficiency of an engine design with respect to thrust output. TSFC may also be thought of as fuel consumption (grams/second) per unit of thrust (newtons, or N), hence thrust-specific. This figure is inversely proportional to specific impulse, which is the amount of thrust produced per unit fuel consumed.

TSFC or SFC for thrust engines (e.g. turbojets, turbofans, ramjets, rockets, etc.) is the mass of fuel needed to provide the net thrust for a given period e.g. lb/(h·lbf) (pounds of fuel per hour-pound of thrust) or g/(s·kN) (grams of fuel per second-kilonewton). Mass of fuel is used, rather than volume (gallons or litres) for the fuel measure, since it is independent of temperature.

Specific fuel consumption of air-breathing jet engines at their maximum efficiency is more or less proportional to exhaust speed. The fuel consumption per mile or per kilometre is a more appropriate comparison for aircraft that travel at very different speeds. Power-specific fuel consumption, the thrust-specific fuel consumption divided by speed, can have units of pounds per hour per horsepower.

== Significance of SFC ==
SFC is dependent on engine design, but differences in the SFC between different engines using the same underlying technology tend to be quite small. Increasing overall pressure ratio on jet engines tends to decrease SFC.

In practical applications, other factors are usually highly significant in determining the fuel efficiency of a particular engine design in that particular application. For instance, in aircraft, turbine (jet and turboprop) engines are typically much smaller and lighter than equivalently powerful piston engine designs, both properties reducing the levels of drag on the plane and reducing the amount of power needed to move the aircraft. Therefore, turbines are more efficient for aircraft propulsion than might be indicated by a simplistic look at the table below.

SFC varies with throttle setting, altitude, climate. For jet engines, air flight speed is an important factor too. Air flight speed counteracts the jet's exhaust speed. (In an artificial and extreme case with the aircraft flying exactly at the exhaust speed, one can easily imagine why the jet's net thrust should be near zero.) Moreover, since work is force (i.e., thrust) times distance, mechanical power is force times speed. Thus, although the nominal SFC is a useful measure of fuel efficiency, it should be divided by speed when comparing engines at different speeds.

For example, Concorde cruised at 1354 mph, or 7.15 million feet per hour, with its engines giving an SFC of 1.195 lb/(lbf·h) (see below); this means the engines transferred 5.98 million foot pounds per pound of fuel (17.9 MJ/kg), equivalent, for a subsonic aircraft flying at 570 mph, to an SFC of 0.50 lb/(lbf·h), better than subsonic engines of the time. The Olympus 593 used in the Concorde was the world's most efficient jet engine. However, Concorde ultimately has a heavier airframe and, due to being supersonic, is less aerodynamically efficient, i.e., the lift to drag ratio is far lower. In general, the total fuel burn of a complete aircraft is of far more importance to the customer.

== Units ==
	Specific impulse (by weight)	Specific impulse (by mass)	Effective exhaust velocity	Specific fuel consumption
SI	=X seconds	=9.8066 X N·s/kg	=9.8066 X m/s	=101,972 (1/X) g/(kN·s) / {g/(kN·s)=s/m}
Imperial units	=X seconds	=X lbf·s/lb	=32.16 X ft/s	=3,600 (1/X) lb/(lbf·h)

== Typical values of SFC for thrust engines ==
Rocket engines in vacuum
Model	Type	First run	Application	TSFC		I_{sp} (by weight)	I_{sp} (by mass)
Model	Type	First run	Application	lb/lbf·h	g/kN·s	s	m/s
Avio P80	solid fuel	2006	Vega stage 1	13	360	280	2700
Avio Zefiro 23	solid fuel	2006	Vega stage 2	12.52	354.7	287.5	2819
Avio Zefiro 9A	solid fuel	2008	Vega stage 3	12.20	345.4	295.2	2895
Merlin 1D	liquid fuel	2013	Falcon 9	12	330	310	3000
RD-843	liquid fuel	2012	Vega upper stage	11.41	323.2	315.5	3094
Kuznetsov NK-33	liquid fuel	1970s	N-1F, Soyuz-2-1v stage 1	10.9	308	331	3250
NPO Energomash RD-171M	liquid fuel	1985	Zenit-2M, -3SL, -3SLB, -3F stage 1	10.7	303	337	3300
LE-7A	cryogenic	2001	H-IIA, H-IIB stage 1	8.22	233	438	4300
Snecma HM-7B	cryogenic	1979	Ariane 2, 3, 4, 5 ECA upper stage	8.097	229.4	444.6	4360
LE-5B-2	cryogenic	2009	H-IIA, H-IIB upper stage	8.05	228	447	4380
Aerojet Rocketdyne RS-25	cryogenic	1981	Space Shuttle, SLS stage 1	7.95	225	453	4440
Aerojet Rocketdyne RL-10B-2	cryogenic	1998	Delta III, Delta IV, SLS upper stage	7.734	219.1	465.5	4565
NERVA NRX A6	nuclear	1967				869	

Jet engines with Reheat, static, sea level
Model	Type	First run	Application	TSFC		I_{sp} (by weight)	I_{sp} (by mass)
Model	Type	First run	Application	lb/lbf·h	g/kN·s	s	m/s
Turbo-Union RB.199	turbofan		Tornado	2.5	70.8	1440	14120
GE F101-GE-102	turbofan	1970s	B-1B	2.46	70	1460	14400
Tumansky R-25-300	turbojet		MIG-21bis	2.206	62.5	1632	16000
GE J85-GE-21	turbojet		F-5E/F	2.13	60.3	1690	16570
GE F110-GE-132	turbofan		F-16E/F	2.09	59.2	1722	16890
Honeywell/ITEC F125	turbofan		F-CK-1	2.06	58.4	1748	17140
Snecma M53-P2	turbofan		Mirage 2000C/D/N	2.05	58.1	1756	17220
Snecma Atar 09C	turbojet		Mirage III	2.03	57.5	1770	17400
Snecma Atar 09K-50	turbojet		Mirage IV, 50, F1	1.991	56.4	1808	17730
GE J79-GE-15	turbojet		F-4E/EJ/F/G, RF-4E	1.965	55.7	1832	17970
Saturn AL-31F	turbofan		Su-27/P/K	1.96	55.5	1837	18010
GE F110-GE-129	turbofan		F-16C/D, F-15EX	1.9	53.8	1895	18580
Soloviev D-30F6	turbofan		MiG-31, S-37/Su-47	1.863	52.8	1932	18950
Lyulka AL-21F-3	turbojet		Su-17, Su-22	1.86	52.7	1935	18980
Klimov RD-33	turbofan	1974	MiG-29	1.85	52.4	1946	19080
Saturn AL-41F-1S	turbofan		Su-35S/T-10BM	1.819	51.5	1979	19410
Volvo RM12	turbofan	1978	Gripen A/B/C/D	1.78	50.4	2022	19830
GE F404-GE-402	turbofan		F/A-18C/D	1.74	49	2070	20300
Kuznetsov NK-32	turbofan	1980	Tu-144LL, Tu-160	1.7	48	2100	21000
Snecma M88-2	turbofan	1989	Rafale	1.663	47.11	2165	21230
Eurojet EJ200	turbofan	1991	Eurofighter	1.66–1.73	47–49	2080–2170	20400–21300

Dry jet engines, static, sea level
Model	Type	First run	Application	TSFC		I_{sp} (by weight)	I_{sp} (by mass)
Model	Type	First run	Application	lb/lbf·h	g/kN·s	s	m/s
GE J85-GE-21	turbojet		F-5E/F	1.24	35.1	2900	28500
Snecma Atar 09C	turbojet		Mirage III	1.01	28.6	3560	35000
Snecma Atar 09K-50	turbojet		Mirage IV, 50, F1	0.981	27.8	3670	36000
Snecma Atar 08K-50	turbojet		Super Étendard	0.971	27.5	3710	36400
Tumansky R-25-300	turbojet		MIG-21bis	0.961	27.2	3750	36700
Lyulka AL-21F-3	turbojet		Su-17, Su-22	0.86	24.4	4190	41100
GE J79-GE-15	turbojet		F-4E/EJ/F/G, RF-4E	0.85	24.1	4240	41500
Snecma M53-P2	turbofan		Mirage 2000C/D/N	0.85	24.1	4240	41500
Volvo RM12	turbofan	1978	Gripen A/B/C/D	0.824	23.3	4370	42800
RR Turbomeca Adour	turbofan	1999	Jaguar retrofit	0.81	23	4400	44000
Honeywell/ITEC F124	turbofan	1979	L-159, X-45	0.81	22.9	4440	43600
Honeywell/ITEC F125	turbofan		F-CK-1	0.8	22.7	4500	44100
PW J52-P-408	turbojet		A-4M/N, TA-4KU, EA-6B	0.79	22.4	4560	44700
Saturn AL-41F-1S	turbofan		Su-35S/T-10BM	0.79	22.4	4560	44700
Snecma M88-2	turbofan	1989	Rafale	0.782	22.14	4600	45100
Klimov RD-33	turbofan	1974	MiG-29	0.77	21.8	4680	45800
RR Pegasus 11-61	turbofan		AV-8B+	0.76	21.5	4740	46500
Eurojet EJ200	turbofan	1991	Eurofighter	0.74–0.81	21–23	4400–4900	44000–48000
GE F414-GE-400	turbofan	1993	F/A-18E/F	0.724	20.5	4970	48800
Kuznetsov NK-32	turbofan	1980	Tu-144LL, Tu-160	0.72-0.73	20–21	4900–5000	48000–49000
Soloviev D-30F6	turbofan		MiG-31, S-37/Su-47	0.716	20.3	5030	49300
Snecma Larzac	turbofan	1972	Alpha Jet	0.716	20.3	5030	49300
IHI F3	turbofan	1981	Kawasaki T-4	0.7	19.8	5140	50400
Saturn AL-31F	turbofan		Su-27 /P/K	0.666-0.78	18.9–22.1	4620–5410	45300–53000
RR Spey RB.168	turbofan		AMX	0.66	18.7	5450	53500
GE F110-GE-129	turbofan		F-16C/D, F-15	0.64	18	5600	55000
GE F110-GE-132	turbofan		F-16E/F	0.64	18	5600	55000
Turbo-Union RB.199	turbofan		Tornado ECR	0.637	18.0	5650	55400
PW F119-PW-100	turbofan	1992	F-22	0.61	17.3	5900	57900
Turbo-Union RB.199	turbofan		Tornado	0.598	16.9	6020	59000
GE F101-GE-102	turbofan	1970s	B-1B	0.562	15.9	6410	62800
PW TF33-P-3	turbofan		B-52H, NB-52H	0.52	14.7	6920	67900
RR AE 3007H	turbofan		RQ-4, MQ-4C	0.39	11.0	9200	91000
GE F118-GE-100	turbofan	1980s	B-2	0.375	10.6	9600	94000
GE F118-GE-101	turbofan	1980s	U-2S	0.375	10.6	9600	94000
General Electric CF6-50C2	turbofan		A300, DC-10-30	0.371	10.5	9700	95000
GE TF34-GE-100	turbofan		A-10	0.37	10.5	9700	95000
CFM CFM56-2B1	turbofan		C-135, RC-135	0.36	10	10000	98000
Progress D-18T	turbofan	1980	An-124, An-225	0.345	9.8	10400	102000
PW F117-PW-100	turbofan		C-17	0.34	9.6	10600	104000
PW PW2040	turbofan		Boeing 757	0.33	9.3	10900	107000
CFM CFM56-3C1	turbofan		737 Classic	0.33	9.3	11000	110000
GE CF6-80C2	turbofan		744, 767, MD-11, A300/310, C-5M	0.307-0.344	8.7–9.7	10500–11700	103000–115000
EA GP7270	turbofan		A380-861	0.299	8.5	12000	118000
GE GE90-85B	turbofan		777-200/200ER/300	0.298	8.44	12080	118500
GE GE90-94B	turbofan		777-200/200ER/300	0.2974	8.42	12100	118700
RR Trent 970-84	turbofan	2003	A380-841	0.295	8.36	12200	119700
GE GEnx-1B70	turbofan		787-8	0.2845	8.06	12650	124100
RR Trent 1000C	turbofan	2006	787-9	0.273	7.7	13200	129000

Jet engines, cruise
Model	Type	First run	Application	TSFC		I_{sp} (by weight)	I_{sp} (by mass)
Model	Type	First run	Application	lb/lbf·h	g/kN·s	s	m/s
	Ramjet		Mach 1	4.5	130	800	7800
J-58	turbojet	1958	SR-71 at Mach 3.2 (Reheat)	1.9	53.8	1895	18580
RR/Snecma Olympus	turbojet	1966	Concorde at Mach 2	1.195	33.8	3010	29500
PW JT8D-9	turbofan		737 Original	0.8	22.7	4500	44100
Honeywell ALF502R-5	GTF		BAe 146	0.72	20.4	5000	49000
Soloviev D-30KP-2	turbofan		Il-76, Il-78	0.715	20.3	5030	49400
Soloviev D-30KU-154	turbofan		Tu-154M	0.705	20.0	5110	50100
RR Tay RB.183	turbofan	1984	Fokker 70, Fokker 100	0.69	19.5	5220	51200
GE CF34-3	turbofan	1982	Challenger, CRJ100/200	0.69	19.5	5220	51200
GE CF34-8E	turbofan		E170/175	0.68	19.3	5290	51900
Honeywell TFE731-60	GTF		Falcon 900	0.679	19.2	5300	52000
CFM CFM56-2C1	turbofan		DC-8 Super 70	0.671	19.0	5370	52600
GE CF34-8C	turbofan		CRJ700/900/1000	0.67-0.68	19–19	5300–5400	52000–53000
CFM CFM56-3C1	turbofan		737 Classic	0.667	18.9	5400	52900
CFM CFM56-2A2	turbofan	1974	E-3, E-6	0.66	18.7	5450	53500
RR BR725	turbofan	2008	G650/ER	0.657	18.6	5480	53700
CFM CFM56-2B1	turbofan		C-135, RC-135	0.65	18.4	5540	54300
GE CF34-10A	turbofan		ARJ21	0.65	18.4	5540	54300
CFE CFE738-1-1B	turbofan	1990	Falcon 2000	0.645	18.3	5580	54700
RR BR710	turbofan	1995	G. V/G550, Global Express	0.64	18	5600	55000
GE CF34-10E	turbofan		E190/195	0.64	18	5600	55000
General Electric CF6-50C2	turbofan		A300B2/B4/C4/F4, DC-10-30	0.63	17.8	5710	56000
PowerJet SaM146	turbofan		Superjet LR	0.629	17.8	5720	56100
CFM CFM56-7B24	turbofan		737 NG	0.627	17.8	5740	56300
RR BR715	turbofan	1997	717	0.62	17.6	5810	56900
GE CF6-80C2-B1F	turbofan		747-400	0.605	17.1	5950	58400
CFM CFM56-5A1	turbofan		A320	0.596	16.9	6040	59200
Aviadvigatel PS-90A1	turbofan		Il-96-400	0.595	16.9	6050	59300
PW PW2040	turbofan		757-200	0.582	16.5	6190	60700
PW PW4098	turbofan		777-300	0.581	16.5	6200	60800
GE CF6-80C2-B2	turbofan		767	0.576	16.3	6250	61300
IAE V2525-D5	turbofan		MD-90	0.574	16.3	6270	61500
IAE V2533-A5	turbofan		A321-231	0.574	16.3	6270	61500
RR Trent 700	turbofan	1992	A330	0.562	15.9	6410	62800
RR Trent 800	turbofan	1993	777-200/200ER/300	0.560	15.9	6430	63000
Progress D-18T	turbofan	1980	An-124, An-225	0.546	15.5	6590	64700
CFM CFM56-5B4	turbofan		A320-214	0.545	15.4	6610	64800
CFM CFM56-5C2	turbofan		A340-211	0.545	15.4	6610	64800
RR Trent 500	turbofan	1999	A340-500/600	0.542	15.4	6640	65100
CFM LEAP-1B	turbofan	2014	737 MAX	0.53-0.56	15–16	6400–6800	63000–67000
Aviadvigatel PD-14	turbofan	2014	MC-21-310	0.526	14.9	6840	67100
RR Trent 900	turbofan	2003	A380	0.522	14.8	6900	67600
GE GE90-85B	turbofan		777-200/200ER	0.52	14.7	6920	67900
GE GEnx-1B76	turbofan	2006	787-10	0.512	14.5	7030	69000
PW PW1400G	GTF		MC-21	0.51	14.4	7100	69000
CFM LEAP-1C	turbofan	2013	C919	0.51	14.4	7100	69000
CFM LEAP-1A	turbofan	2013	A320neo family	0.51	14.4	7100	69000
RR Trent 7000	turbofan	2015	A330neo	0.506 (Note: 10% better than Trent 700)	14.3	7110	69800
RR Trent 1000	turbofan	2006	787	0.506 (Note: 10% better than Trent 700)	14.3	7110	69800
RR Trent XWB-97	turbofan	2014	A350-1000	0.478 (Note: 15 per cent fuel consumption advantage over the original Trent engine)	13.5	7530	73900
PW 1127G	GTF	2012	A320neo	0.463	13.1	7780	76300

Civil engines
Model	SL thrust	BPR	OPR	SL SFC	cruise SFC	Weight	Layout	cost ($M)	Introduction
GE GE90	90,000 lbf 400 kN	8.4	39.3		0.545 lb/(lbf⋅h); 15.4 g/(kN⋅s)	16,644 lb 7,550 kg	1+3LP 10HP; 2HP 6LP	11	1995
RR Trent	71,100–91,300 lbf 316–406 kN	4.89-5.74	36.84-42.7		0.557–0.565 lb/(lbf⋅h); 15.8–16.0 g/(kN⋅s)	10,550–13,133 lb 4,785–5,957 kg	1LP 8IP 6HP; 1HP 1IP 4/5LP	11-11.7	1995
PW4000	52,000–84,000 lbf 230–370 kN	4.85-6.41	27.5-34.2	0.348–0.359 lb/(lbf⋅h); 9.9–10.2 g/(kN⋅s)		9,400–14,350 lb 4,260–6,510 kg	1+4-6LP 11HP; 2HP 4-7LP	6.15-9.44	1986-1994
RB211	43,100–60,600 lbf 192–270 kN	4.30	25.8-33		0.570–0.598 lb/(lbf⋅h); 16.1–16.9 g/(kN⋅s)	7,264–9,670 lb 3,295–4,386 kg	1LP 6/7IP 6HP; 1HP 1IP 3LP	5.3-6.8	1984-1989
GE CF6	52,500–67,500 lbf 234–300 kN	4.66-5.31	27.1-32.4	0.32–0.35 lb/(lbf⋅h); 9.1–9.9 g/(kN⋅s)	0.562–0.623 lb/(lbf⋅h); 15.9–17.6 g/(kN⋅s)	8,496–10,726 lb 3,854–4,865 kg	1+3/4LP 14HP; 2HP 4/5LP	5.9-7	1981-1987
D-18	51,660 lbf 229.8 kN	5.60	25.0		0.570 lb/(lbf⋅h); 16.1 g/(kN⋅s)	9,039 lb 4,100 kg	1LP 7IP 7HP; 1HP 1IP 4LP		1982
PW2000	38,250 lbf 170.1 kN	6	31.8	0.33 lb/(lbf⋅h); 9.3 g/(kN⋅s)	0.582 lb/(lbf⋅h); 16.5 g/(kN⋅s)	7,160 lb 3,250 kg	1+4LP 11HP; 2HP 5LP	4	1983
PS-90	35,275 lbf 156.91 kN	4.60	35.5		0.595 lb/(lbf⋅h); 16.9 g/(kN⋅s)	6,503 lb 2,950 kg	1+2LP 13HP; 2 HP 4LP		1992
IAE V2500	22,000–33,000 lbf 98–147 kN	4.60-5.40	24.9-33.40	0.34–0.37 lb/(lbf⋅h); 9.6–10.5 g/(kN⋅s)	0.574–0.581 lb/(lbf⋅h); 16.3–16.5 g/(kN⋅s)	5,210–5,252 lb 2,363–2,382 kg	1+4LP 10HP; 2HP 5LP		1989-1994
CFM56	20,600–31,200 lbf 92–139 kN	4.80-6.40	25.70-31.50	0.32–0.36 lb/(lbf⋅h); 9.1–10.2 g/(kN⋅s)	0.545–0.667 lb/(lbf⋅h); 15.4–18.9 g/(kN⋅s)	4,301–5,700 lb 1,951–2,585 kg	1+3/4LP 9HP; 1HP 4/5LP	3.20-4.55	1986-1997
D-30	23,850 lbf 106.1 kN	2.42			0.700 lb/(lbf⋅h); 19.8 g/(kN⋅s)	5,110 lb 2,320 kg	1+3LP 11HP; 2HP 4LP		1982
JT8D	21,700 lbf 97 kN	1.77	19.2	0.519 lb/(lbf⋅h); 14.7 g/(kN⋅s)	0.737 lb/(lbf⋅h); 20.9 g/(kN⋅s)	4,515 lb 2,048 kg	1+6LP 7HP; 1HP 3LP	2.99	1986
BR700	14,845–19,883 lbf 66.03–88.44 kN	4.00-4.70	25.7-32.1	0.370–0.390 lb/(lbf⋅h); 10.5–11.0 g/(kN⋅s)	0.620–0.640 lb/(lbf⋅h); 17.6–18.1 g/(kN⋅s)	3,520–4,545 lb 1,597–2,062 kg	1+1/2LP 10HP; 2HP 2/3LP		1996
D-436	16,865 lbf 75.02 kN	4.95	25.2		0.610 lb/(lbf⋅h); 17.3 g/(kN⋅s)	3,197 lb 1,450 kg	1+1L 6I 7HP; 1HP 1IP 3LP		1996
RR Tay	13,850–15,400 lbf 61.6–68.5 kN	3.04-3.07	15.8-16.6	0.43–0.45 lb/(lbf⋅h); 12–13 g/(kN⋅s)	0.690 lb/(lbf⋅h); 19.5 g/(kN⋅s)	2,951–3,380 lb 1,339–1,533 kg	1+3LP 12HP; 2HP 3LP	2.6	1988-1992
RR Spey	9,900–11,400 lbf 44–51 kN	0.64-0.71	15.5-18.4	0.56 lb/(lbf⋅h); 16 g/(kN⋅s)	0.800 lb/(lbf⋅h); 22.7 g/(kN⋅s)	2,287–2,483 lb 1,037–1,126 kg	4/5LP 12HP; 2HP 2LP		1968-1969
GE CF34	9,220 lbf 41.0 kN		21	0.35 lb/(lbf⋅h); 9.9 g/(kN⋅s)		1,670 lb 760 kg	1F 14HP; 2HP 4LP		1996
AE3007	7,150 lbf 31.8 kN		24.0	0.390 lb/(lbf⋅h); 11.0 g/(kN⋅s)		1,581 lb 717 kg			
ALF502/LF507	6,970–7,000 lbf 31.0–31.1 kN	5.60-5.70	12.2-13.8	0.406–0.408 lb/(lbf⋅h); 11.5–11.6 g/(kN⋅s)	0.414–0.720 lb/(lbf⋅h); 11.7–20.4 g/(kN⋅s)	1,336–1,385 lb 606–628 kg	1+2L 7+1HP; 2HP 2LP	1.66	1982-1991
CFE738	5,918 lbf 26.32 kN	5.30	23.0	0.369 lb/(lbf⋅h); 10.5 g/(kN⋅s)	0.645 lb/(lbf⋅h); 18.3 g/(kN⋅s)	1,325 lb 601 kg	1+5LP+1CF; 2HP 3LP		1992
PW300	5,266 lbf 23.42 kN	4.50	23.0	0.391 lb/(lbf⋅h); 11.1 g/(kN⋅s)	0.675 lb/(lbf⋅h); 19.1 g/(kN⋅s)	993 lb 450 kg	1+4LP+1HP; 2HP 3LP		1990
JT15D	3,045 lbf 13.54 kN	3.30	13.1	0.560 lb/(lbf⋅h); 15.9 g/(kN⋅s)	0.541 lb/(lbf⋅h); 15.3 g/(kN⋅s)	632 lb 287 kg	1+1LP+1CF; 1HP 2LP		1983
WI FJ44-4A	1,900 lbf 8.5 kN	3.28	12.80	0.456 lb/(lbf⋅h); 12.9 g/(kN⋅s)	0.75 lb/(lbf⋅h); 21 g/(kN⋅s)	445 lb 202 kg	1+1L 1C 1H; 1HP 2LP		1992
WI FJ33-5A	1,000–1,800 lbf 4.4–8.0 kN			0.486 lb/(lbf⋅h); 13.8 g/(kN⋅s)		300 lb 140 kg			2016

The following table gives the efficiency for several engines when running at 80% throttle, which is approximately what is used in cruising, giving a minimum SFC. The efficiency is the amount of power propelling the plane divided by the rate of energy consumption. Since the power equals thrust times speed, the efficiency is given by

$$\eta=V/(SFC\times h)$$

where V is speed and h is the energy content per unit mass of fuel (the higher heating value is used here, and at higher speeds the kinetic energy of the fuel or propellant becomes substantial and must be included).

typical subsonic cruise, 80% throttle, min SFC
Turbofan	efficiency
GE90	36.1%
PW4000	34.8%
PW2037	35.1% (M.87 40K)
PW2037	33.5% (M.80 35K)
CFM56-2	30.5%
TFE731-2	23.4%

== See also ==
- Brake specific fuel consumption – Measure of the fuel efficiency of internal combustion engines
- Energies per unit mass – Energy per volume
- Specific impulse – Change in velocity per amount of fuel
- Vehicle metrics – Metrics that denote the relative capabilities of various vehicles
