= System-specific impulse =

System-specific Impulse, I_{ssp} is a measure that describes performance of jet propulsion systems. A reference number is introduced, which defines the total impulse, I_{tot}, delivered by the system, divided by the system mass, m_{PS}:

I_{ssp}=I_{tot}/m_{PS}

Because of the resulting dimension, - delivered impulse per kilogram of system mass m_{PS}, this number is called 'System-specific Impulse'. In SI units, impulse is measured in newton-seconds (N·s) and I_{ssp} in N·s/kg.

The I_{ssp} allows a more accurate determination of the propulsive performance of jet propulsion systems than the commonly used Specific Impulse, I_{sp}, which only takes into account the propellant and the thrust engine performance characteristics. Therefore, the I_{ssp} permits an objective and comparative performance evaluation of systems of different designs and with different propellants.

The I_{ssp} can be derived directly from actual jet propulsion systems by determining the total impulse delivered by the mass of contained propellant, divided by the known total (wet) mass of the propulsion system. This allows a quantitative comparison of for example, built systems.

In addition, the I_{ssp} can be derived analytically, for example for spacecraft propulsion systems, in order to facilitate a preliminary selection of systems (chemical, electrical) for spacecraft missions of given impulse and velocity-increment requirements. A more detailed presentation of derived mathematical formulas for I_{ssp} and their applications for spacecraft propulsion are given in the cited references. In 2019 Koppel and others used I_{SSP} as a criterion in selection of electric thrusters.

== See also ==
- Specific Impulse
