= Lyulka AL-21 =

Turbojet aircraft engine

AL-21
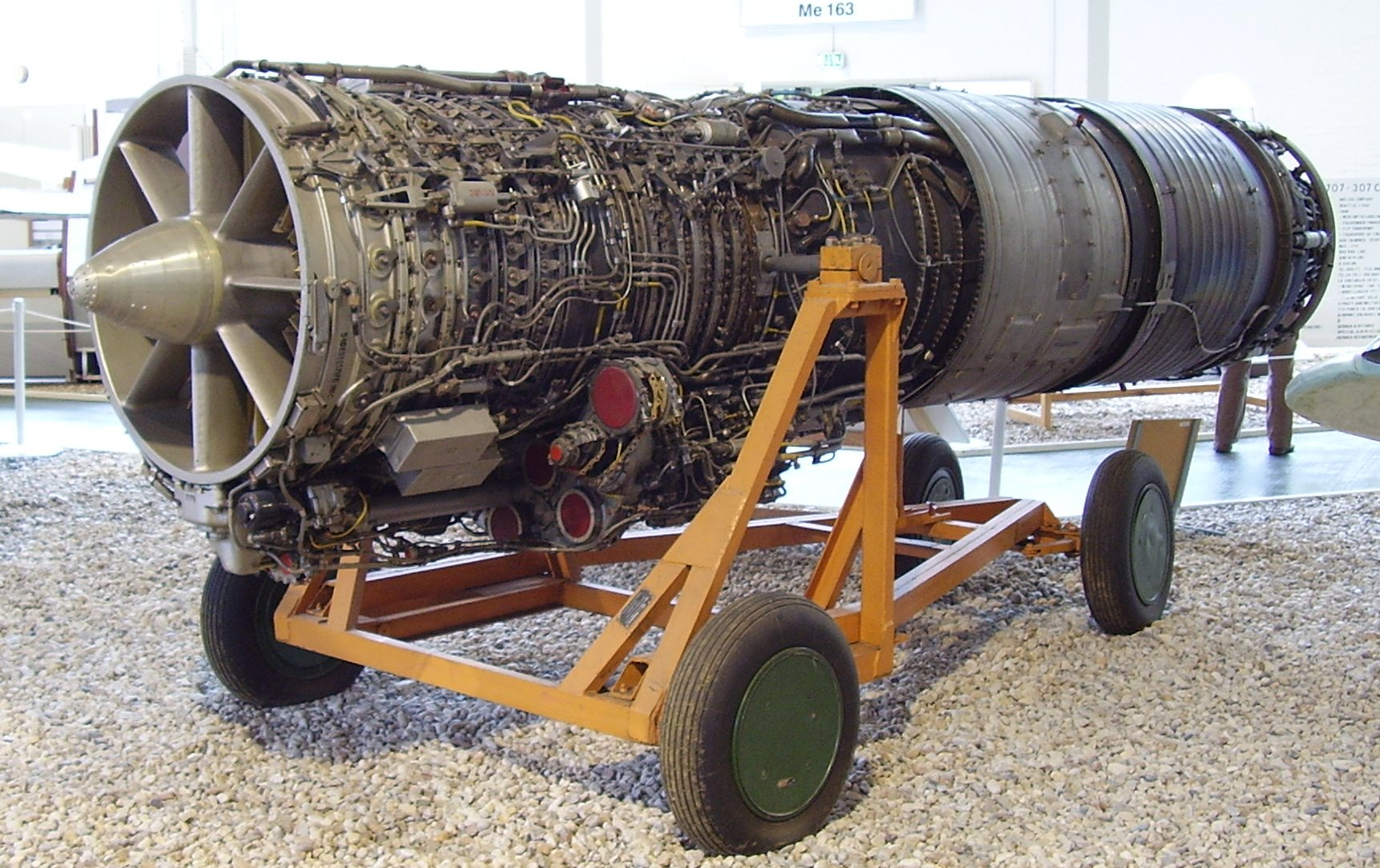
- Lyulka AL-21F3 engine, Airforce Museum of the Bundeswehr; Berlin-Gatow
- Type: Turbojet
- National origin: Soviet Union
- Manufacturer: NPO AL, Salyut, Perm PMZ, OMKB, UMPO, MMP Chern
- Major applications: Sukhoi Su-17; Sukhoi Su-24

The Lyulka AL-21 is an axial flow turbojet engine created by the Soviet Design Bureau named for its chief designer Arkhip Lyulka.

== Design and development ==
The AL-21 is closely similar in technology to the General Electric J79 first flown in 1955, which was the first engine for supersonic flight, using a variable stator.

It is generally described as being in the "third generation" of Soviet gas turbine engines which are characterized by high thrust-to-weight ratios and the use of turbine air cooling.

The AL-21 entered service in the early 1960s. Later designed the AL-21F3, it was used in the Sukhoi Su-17, Sukhoi Su-24, Ground-attack variant Mikoyan-Gurevich MiG-23, and Sukhoi T-10 (Sukhoi Su-27 prototype).

== Specifications (AL-21F3) ==
==== General characteristics ====
- Type: Afterburning turbojet
- Length: 5,300 mm (209 in)
- Diameter: 1,000 mm (39 in)
- Dry weight: 1,700 kg (3,740 lb)

==== Components ====
- Compressor: Single-spool 14-stage axial compressor with variable stator vanes. 10 guide vanes with rotating blades (1 inlet vane, 4 first stages, 5 last stages.
- Turbine: 3-stage

==== Performance ====
- Maximum thrust:
- 76.4 kN (17,175 lbf) dry
- 109.8 kN (24,675 lbf) with afterburner
- Overall pressure ratio: 14.75:1
- Turbine inlet temperature: 1,100 °C (2,000 °F)
- Specific fuel consumption:
  - 77.5 kg/(h·kN) (0.76 lb/(h·lbf)) at idle
  - 87.7 kg/(h·kN) (0.86 lb/(h·lbf)) at maximum military power
  - 189.7 kg/(h·kN) (1.86 lb/(h·lbf)) with afterburner
- Thrust-to-weight ratio: 4.6 maximum military power / 6.6 with afterburner
- Life expectancy: 1,800 hours

== See also ==
- General Electric J79

Related lists

- List of aircraft engines
