= General Electric CF34 =

High bypass turbofan aircraft engine

CF34
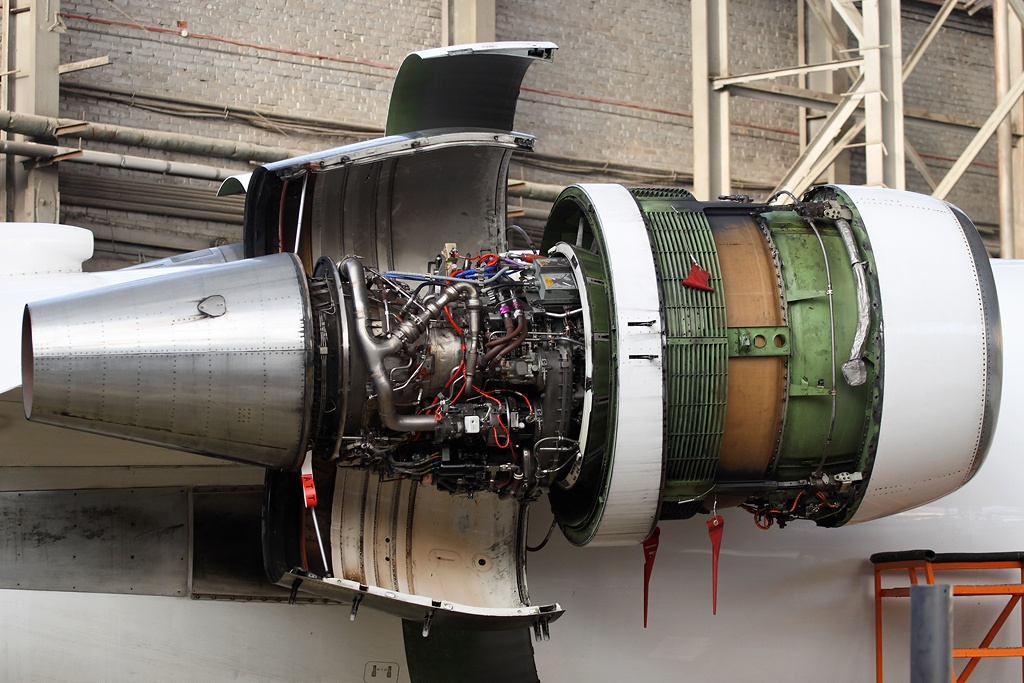
- A CF34 installed on a Bombardier CRJ200
- Type: Turbofan
- National origin: United States
- Manufacturer: GE Aviation
- First run: 1982
- Major applications: Bombardier CRJ; Comac C909; Embraer E-Jets
- Developed from: General Electric TF34
- Developed into: General Electric Passport

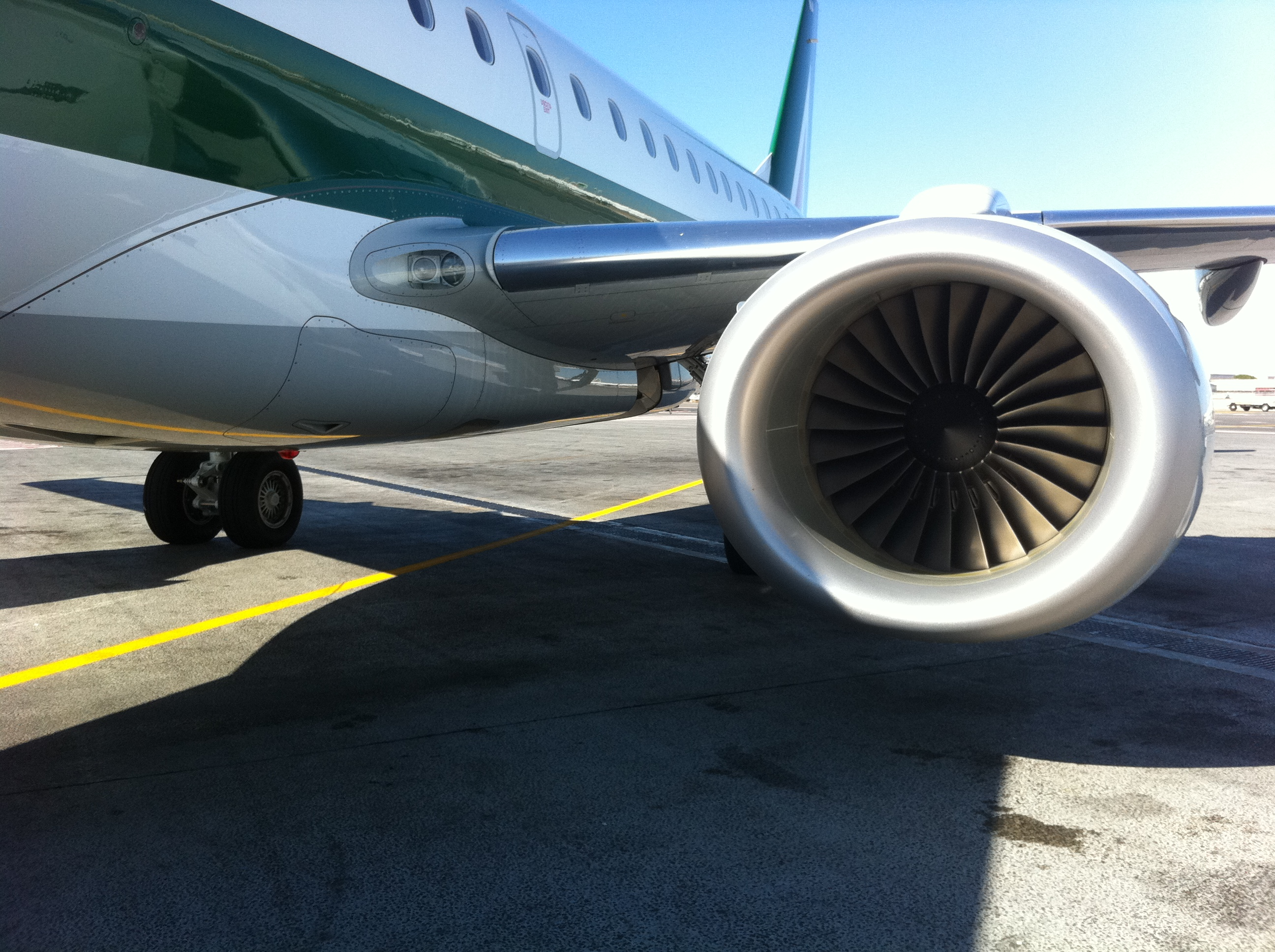
CF34 engine mounted on an Embraer 190.

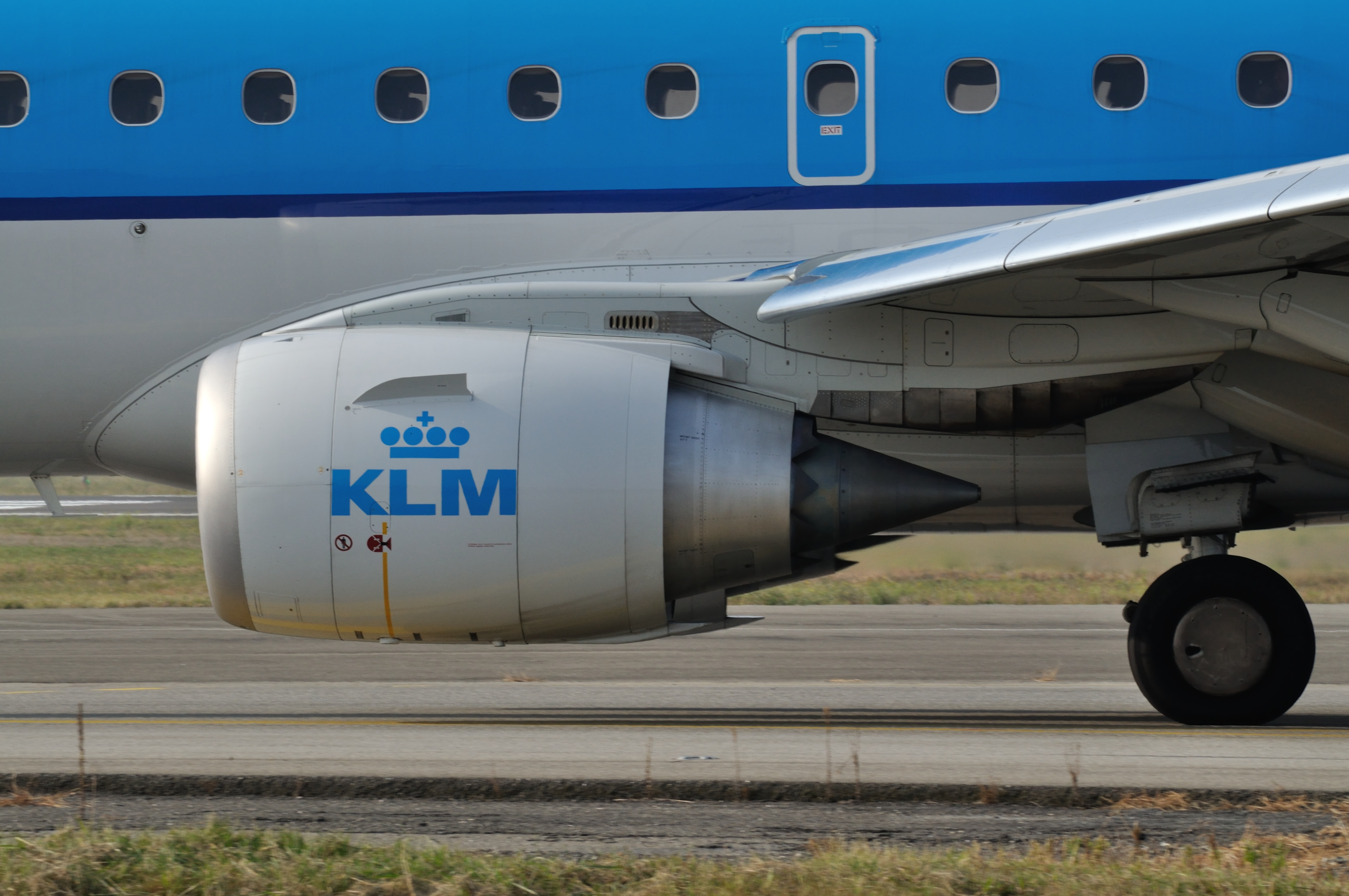
Recent versions of the CF34 feature chevrons on the core nozzle outlet.

The General Electric CF34 is a civilian high-bypass turbofan developed by GE Aviation from its TF34 military engine. The CF34 is used on a number of business and regional jets, including the Bombardier CRJ series, the Embraer E-Jets, and Comac ARJ21/C909. There are 7,500 engines in service.

== Design and development ==
The original engine contained a single stage fan driven by a 4-stage low pressure (LP) turbine, supercharging a 14-stage high pressure (HP) compressor driven by a 2-stage HP turbine, with an annular combustor. Later higher thrust versions of the CF34 feature an advanced technology core, with only 10 HP compressor stages. Latest variants, the -10A and -10E, were derived from the CFM56 engine family, and have a radically different HP spool, containing a 9-stage compressor driven by a single stage turbine. The LP spool has 3 core booster stages behind the fan. Static thrust is 82 kilonewtons (18,500 lbf) for the -10E variant.

On wing times can reach 14,000 hours, an overhaul costs over $1.5 million and a set of LLPs $2.1 million for a 25,000 cycle life. In 1995, GE invested $200 million to develop the -8C derivative for the CRJ700.

In a 2020 solicitation by the US Air Force called the B-52 Commercial Engine Replacement Program, GE had proposed updating the Boeing B-52 Stratofortress with CF34-10 engines. In September 2021, the Rolls-Royce F130 was selected instead of the GE proposal.

== Applications ==
=== CF34-1A ===
- Bombardier Challenger 601-1A

=== CF34-3 ===
==== CF34-3A ====
- Bombardier Challenger 601-3A/3R
- Bombardier CRJ100

==== CF34-3B ====
- Bombardier Challenger 604
- Bombardier Challenger 605
- Bombardier Challenger 650
- Bombardier Challenger 850
- Bombardier CRJ200
- Bombardier CRJ440

=== CF34-8 ===
==== CF34-8C ====
- Bombardier CRJ550
- Bombardier CRJ700
- Bombardier CRJ705
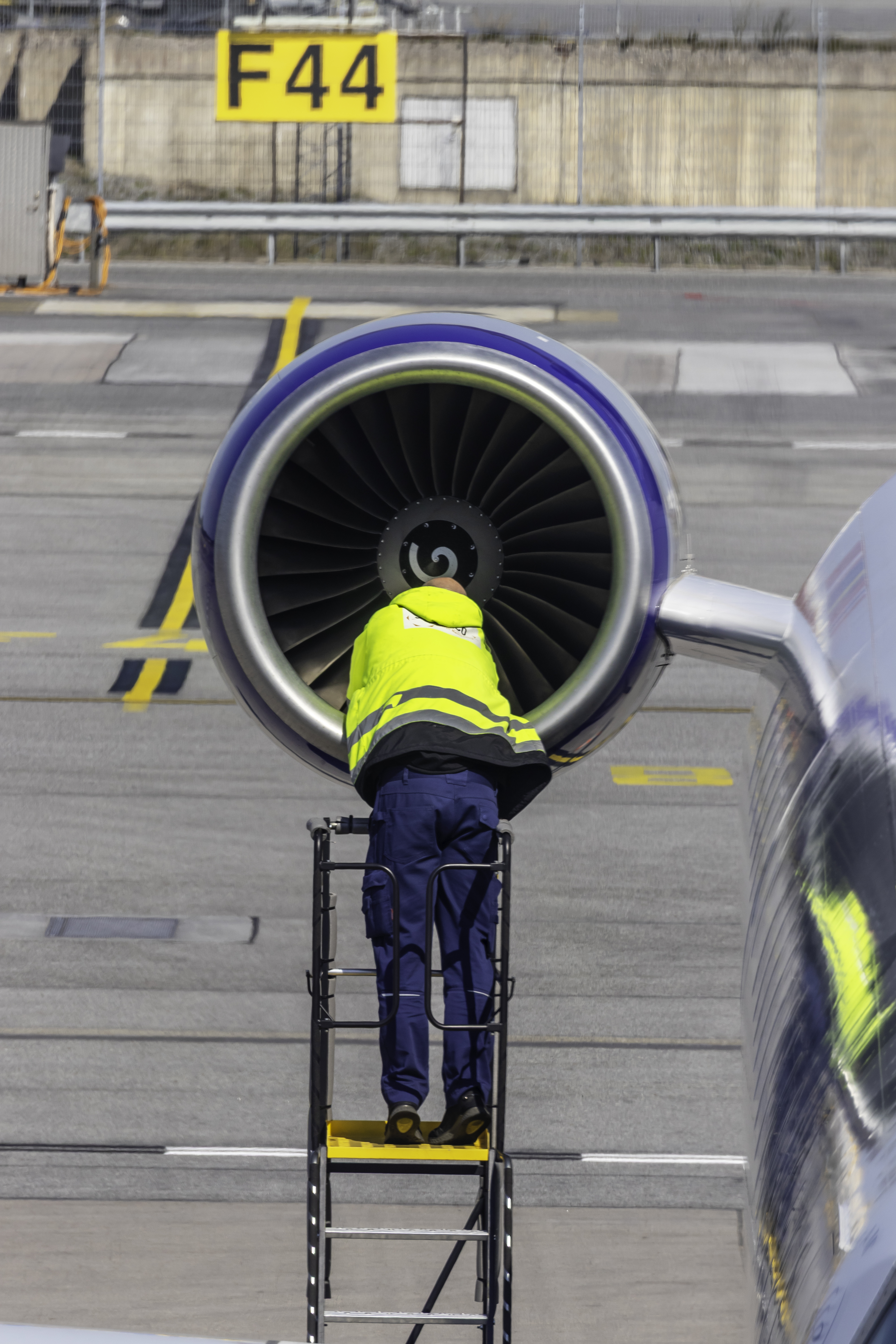
  CF34-8C on the Bombardier CRJ700 series.
- Bombardier CRJ900
- Bombardier CRJ1000

==== CF34-8E ====
- Embraer 170
- Embraer 175

=== CF34-10 ===
==== CF34-10A ====
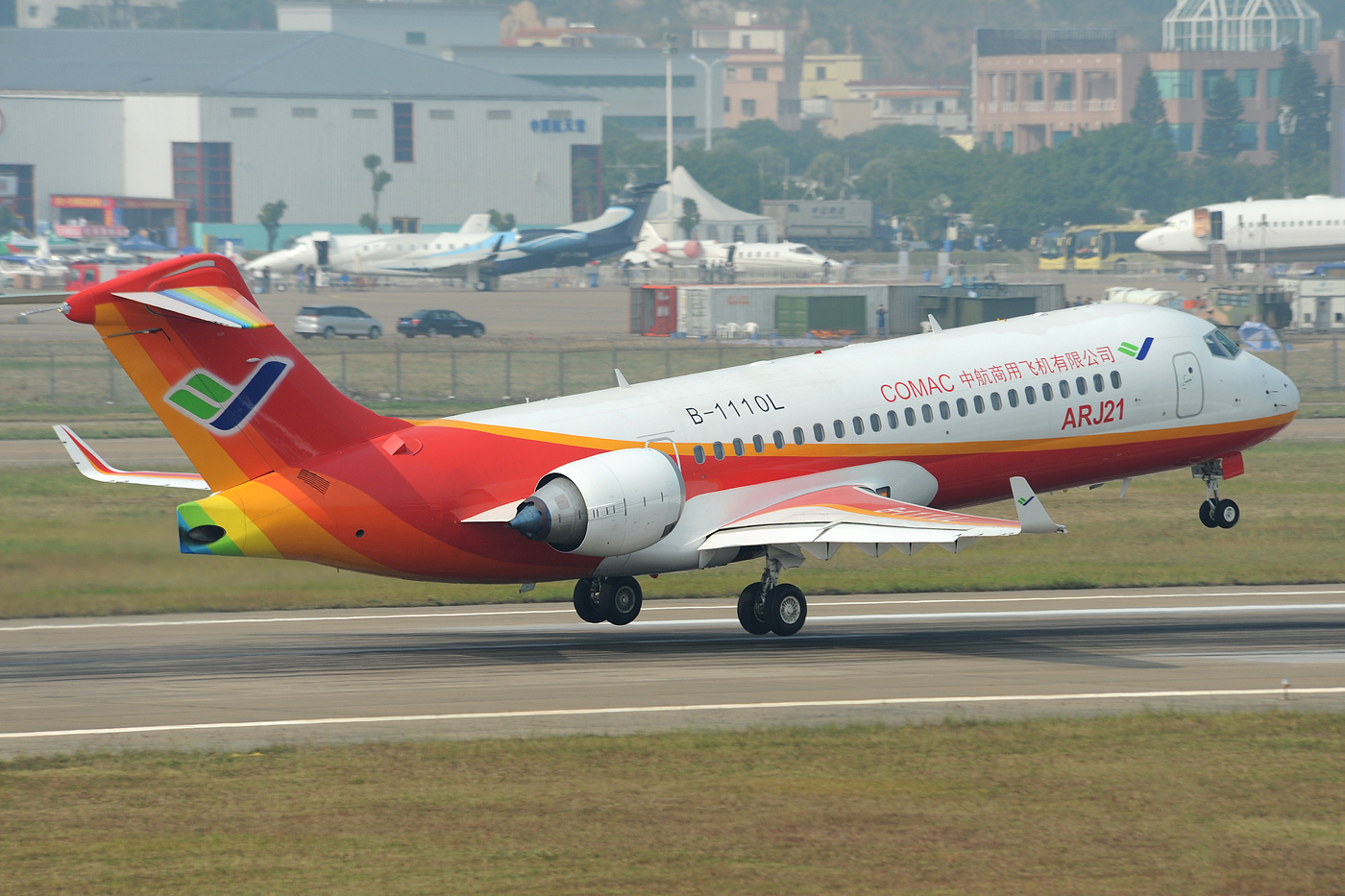
CF34-10A powering the Comac C909

- Comac C909

==== CF34-10E ====
- Embraer 190
- Embraer 195
- Embraer Lineage 1000

== Specifications ==
CF34 Engine Comparison
	CF34-3	CF34-8C	CF34-8E	CF34-10A	CF34-10E
Application	CL600/CRJ200	CRJ700/900/1000	E170/175	C909	E190/195
Length	103 in (2.6 m)	128 in (3.3 m)	121 in (3.1 m)	90 in (2.3 m)	145 in (3.7 m)
Diameter	49 in (1.2 m)	52 in (1.3 m)	53 in (1.3 m)	57 in (1.4 m)	
Dry weight	1,670 lb (760 kg)	2,400–2,450 lb (1,090–1,110 kg)	2,600 lb (1,200 kg)	3,700 lb (1,700 kg)	
Fan	44 in (110 cm)	46.2 in (117 cm)		53 in (130 cm)	
Compressor	14 HP stages, 14:1	10 HP stages		3 LP + 9 HP stages	
Turbine	4 LP + 2 HP stages			4 LP + 1 HP stage	
Thrust (SL)	9,220 lbf (41.0 kN)	13,790–14,500 lbf (61.3–64.5 kN)	14,500 lbf (64 kN)	17,640 lbf (78.5 kN)	20,360 lbf (90.6 kN)
Thrust/weight	5.52:1	5.7–6:1	5.6:1	5.1:1	5.2:1
OPR (max. power)	21:1	28–28.5:1	28.5:1	29:1	
Bypass ratio	6.2:1	5:1			5.4:1
SFC (Cruise)	0.69 lb/lbf/h (20 g/kN/s)	0.67–0.68 lb/lbf/h (19–19 g/kN/s)	0.68 lb/lbf/h (19 g/kN/s)	0.65 lb/lbf/h (18 g/kN/s)	0.64 lb/lbf/h (18 g/kN/s)

== See also ==
Related development

- General Electric TF34

Comparable engines

- NPO Saturn PD-8
- PowerJet SaM146
- Progress D-436
- Pratt & Whitney PW6000
- IAE V2500
- Rolls-Royce AE 3007
- Rolls-Royce BR700
- Rolls-Royce RB.183 Tay

Related lists

- List of aircraft engines
