= General Electric F101 =

Turbofan aircraft engine

F101
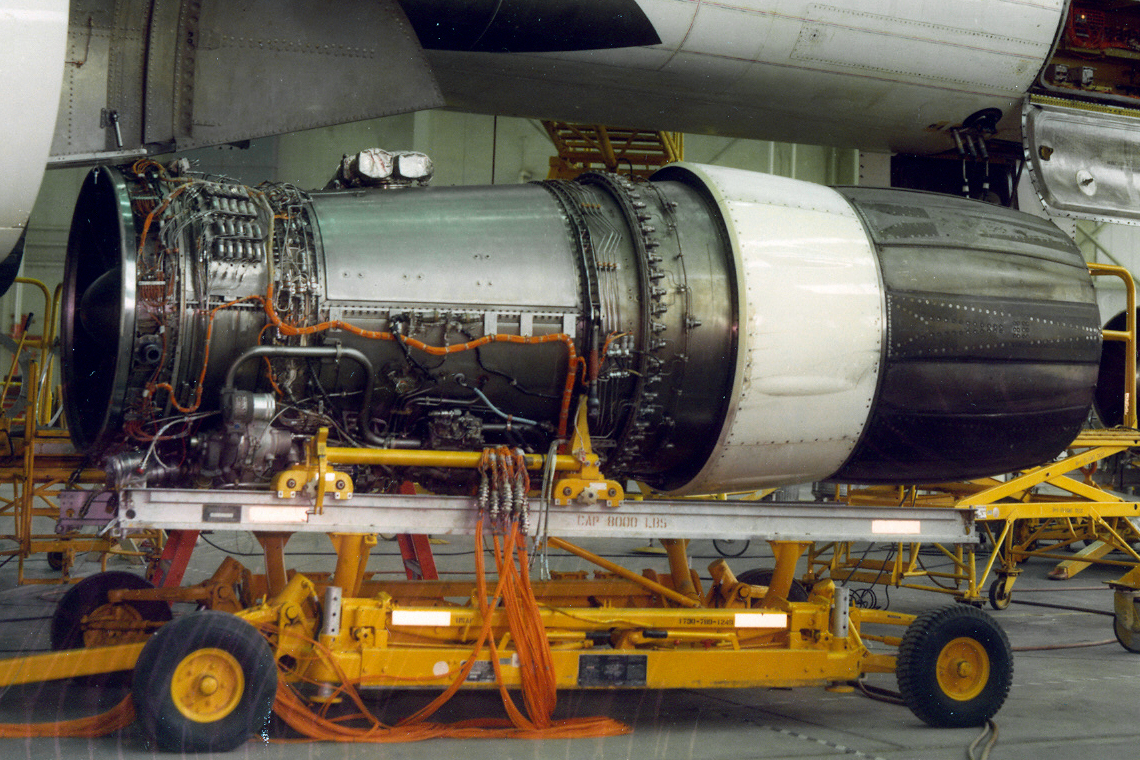
- A General Electric F101 engine
- Type: Turbofan
- National origin: United States
- Manufacturer: General Electric
- First run: early 1970s
- Major applications: Rockwell B-1 Lancer
- Developed into: General Electric F110; CFM International CFM56

The General Electric F101 is an afterburning turbofan jet engine. It powers the Rockwell B-1 Lancer strategic bomber fleet of the USAF. In full afterburner it produces a thrust of more than 30,000 pounds-force (130 kN). The F101 was GE's first turbofan with an afterburner.

== Development ==
The F101 was developed specifically for the Advanced Manned Strategic Aircraft, which became the B-1A. The F101 powered the four development aircraft from 1970 to 1981. The B-1A was officially cancelled in 1977. However the flight test program continued. General Electric was awarded a contract to further develop the F101-102 engine variant. This turbofan eventually powered the B-1B from 1984, entering service in 1986. The B-1's four F101 engines helped the aircraft win 61 world records for speed, time-to-climb, payload and range.

The GE F110 turbofan fighter jet engine is a derivative of the F101, designed using data from the F101-powered variant of the F-16 Fighting Falcon tested in the early 1980s. The F101 also became the basis for the highly successful CFM56 series of civil turbofans.

== Applications ==
- F-16/101
- Rockwell B-1B Lancer

== Specifications (F101-GE-102) ==
Data from

==== General characteristics ====
- Type: Turbofan engine
- Length: 181 in (460 cm)
- Diameter: 55 in (140 cm)
- Dry weight: 4,382 lb (1,988 kg)

==== Components ====
- Compressor: Axial flow, 2 stage fan, 9 stage HP compressor
- Combustors: Annular ring
- Turbine: 1 stage HP turbine, 2 stage LP turbine

==== Performance ====
- Maximum thrust: 17,390 lbf (77.4 kN) (dry), 30,780 lbf (136.9 kN) (with afterburner)
- Overall pressure ratio: 26.8:1
- Bypass ratio: 2.1:1
- Turbine inlet temperature: 2,550 °F (1,400 °C; 1,670 K)
- Specific fuel consumption: 0.562 lb/lbf/h (57.3 kg/kN/h) (dry thrust),
  2.46 lb/lbf/h (251 kg/kN/h) (with afterburner)
- Thrust-to-weight ratio: 7.04:1 (afterburner)

== See also ==
- Shenyang WS-10

Related development

- CFM International CFM56
- General Electric F110
- General Electric F118

Comparable engines

- Kuznetsov NK-32

Related lists

- List of aircraft engines
