= Snecma M53 =

French turbofan engine

M53
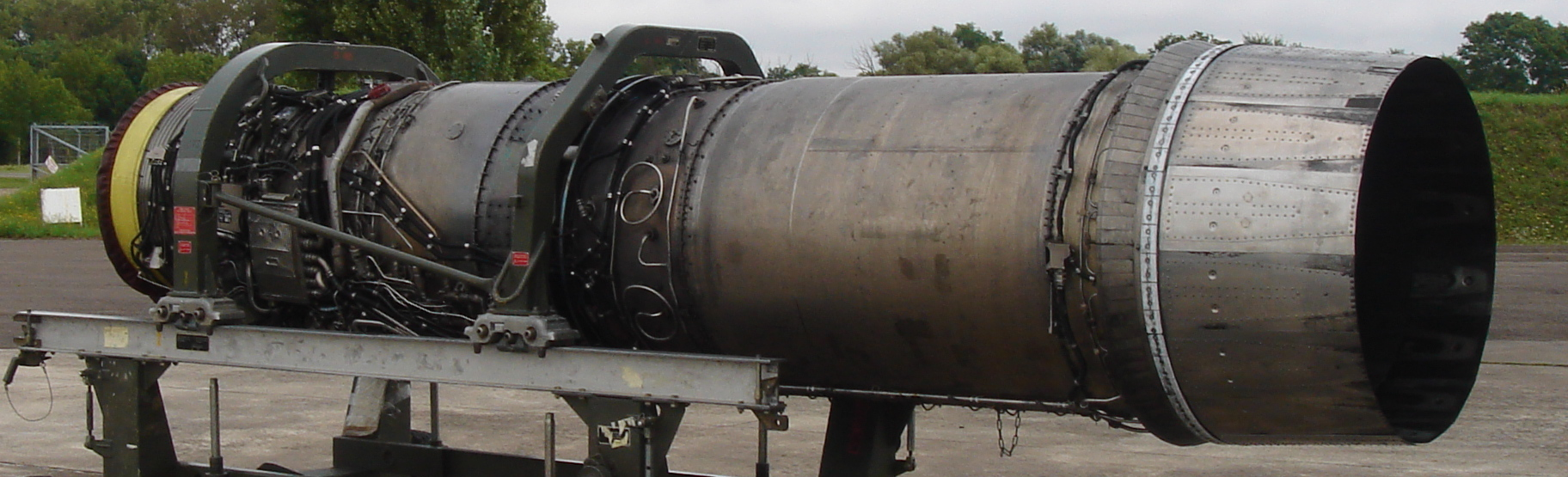
- Type: Turbofan
- National origin: France
- Manufacturer: Snecma
- Major applications: Dassault Mirage 2000

The SNECMA M53 is an afterburning turbofan engine developed for the Dassault Mirage 2000 fighter by Snecma. The engine is in service with different air forces, including the latest Mirage 2000-5 and 2000-9 multirole fighters.

== Design and development ==
The engine was derived from the Atar series by adding a bypass duct aft of the 3rd compressor stage. The first 3 stages were enlarged to give an LP and HP section on the same shaft. It is a single shaft turbofan, or continuous bleed/bypass turbojet. It was originally called the Super Atar 9K50 and was designed for sustained flight at Mach 2.5. Flight testing started in July 1973 using a Caravelle flying test-bed and the engine first went supersonic in a Mirage F.1 test bed at the end of 1974.

The engine was designed to have better performance than the latest Atar engines but simpler and less costly than the SNECMA TF 306 turbofan. The fan and HP compressor on the same shaft gave an engine with no restrictions on throttle movements, known as 'carefree handling', during flight.

The engine has a modular construction, first introduced on the Napier Eland turboprop and then later in a big way with the Pratt & Whitney JT9D engine. Modular construction allows sub-assemblies or modules to be changed without the need for full power testing of the engine after replacement. Modules are changed “on condition” by monitoring deteriorating trends in performance and mechanical measurements, such as exhaust gas temperature and oil samples, and by visually assessing blade clearances and high temperature distress on internal parts using borescopes.

The engine is in service in 8 different air forces, powering the whole Mirage 2000 family of airplanes, including the latest Mirage 2000-5 and 2000-9 multirole fighters.

== Variants ==
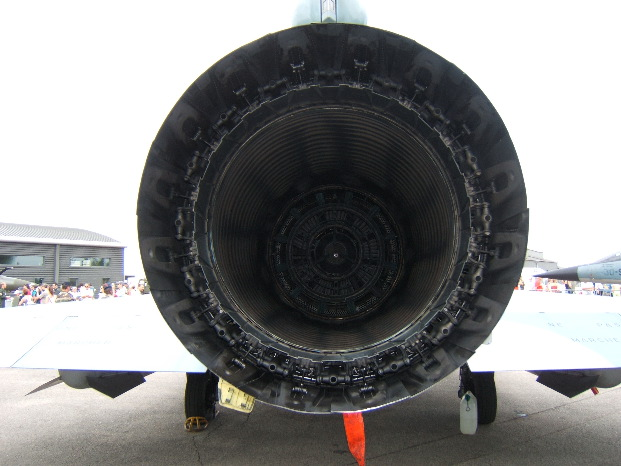
Nozzle of an M53 installed in a Mirage 2000B

- M53-5 - powered initial Mirage 2000C models
  - Dry thrust: 54.0 kN (5,500 kgp / 12,230 lbf)
  - Afterburning thrust: 86.3 kN (8,800 kgp / 19,400 lbf)
- M53-P2 - powered later Mirage 2000C models and used to upgrade earlier models
  - Dry thrust: 64.7 kN (6,600 kgp / 14,500 lbf)
  - Afterburning thrust: 95.1 kN (9,700 kgp / 21,400 lbf)

== Applications ==
- Dassault Mirage 2000
- Dassault Mirage 2000N/2000D
- Dassault Mirage 4000
- Dassault Mirage F1M-53

== Specifications (M53-P2) ==
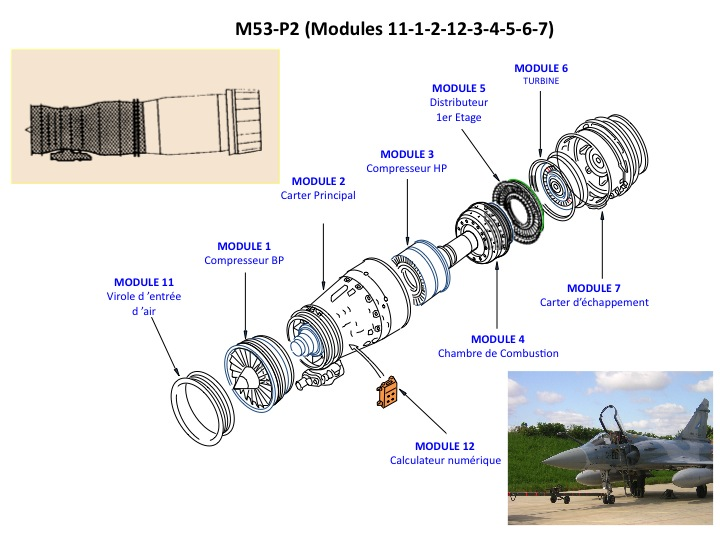
Modules of M53 engine

==== General characteristics ====
- Type: Afterburning single-shaft turbofan
- Length: 5,070 mm (199.60 in)
- Diameter: 796 mm (31.33 in) inlet
- Dry weight: 1,515 kg (3,340 lb)

==== Components ====
- Compressor: 8-stage axial compressor
- Combustors: annular
- Turbine: 2-stage axial turbine

==== Performance ====
- Maximum thrust:
  - 64 kN (14,300 lbf) military thrust
  - 95 kN (21,384 lbf) with afterburner
- Overall pressure ratio: 9.8:1
- Bypass ratio: 0.36:1
- Air mass flow: 92 kg/s
- Turbine inlet temperature: 1 327 °C
- Specific fuel consumption:
  - 0.90(kg/daN.h) military thrust
  - 2.10(kg/daN.h) maximum afterburner
- Thrust-to-weight ratio: 6.5

== See also ==
Related lists

- List of aircraft engines
