= General Electric F118 =

1980s American turbofan engine

F118
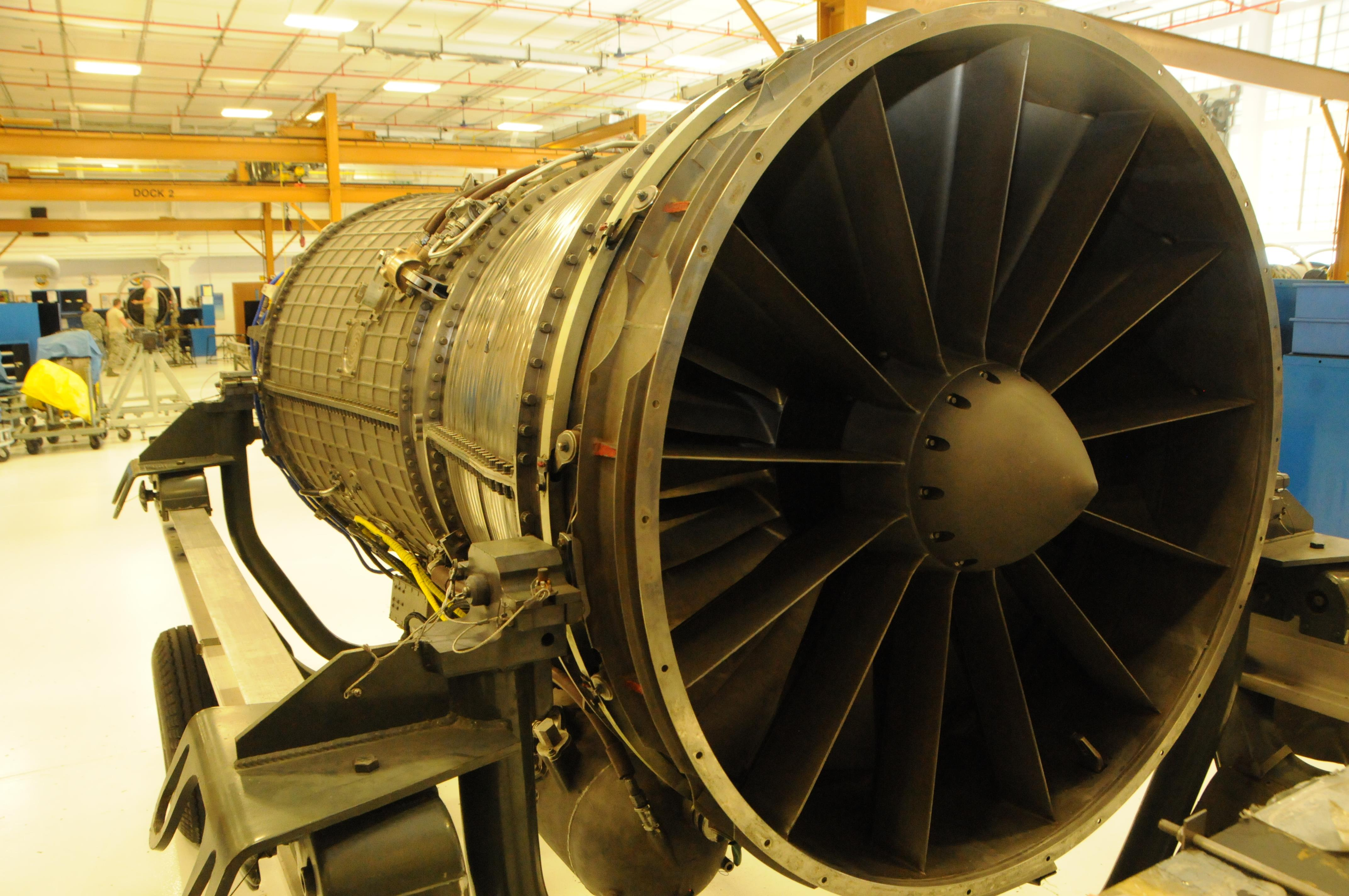
- An F118 engine
- Type: Turbofan
- National origin: United States
- Manufacturer: General Electric
- First run: 1980s
- Major applications: Lockheed U-2; Northrop Grumman B-2 Spirit
- Developed from: General Electric F110

The General Electric F118 is a non-afterburning turbofan engine produced by GE Aviation, and is derived from the General Electric F110 afterburning turbofan.

== Design and development ==
The F118 is a non-afterburning derivative of the F110 specially developed for the B-2 Spirit stealth bomber. A single stage HP turbine drives the 9 stage HP compressor, while a 2-stage LP turbine drives the 3 stage fan. The combustor is annular. Thrust is in the 19,000 lbf (84.5 kN) class. In 1998, the USAF's Lockheed U-2S fleet was fitted with a modified version of the F118 with slightly lower thrust of 17,000 lbf (75.6 kN).

== Variants ==
F118-GE-100
Variant for the B-2
F118-GE-101
Variant for the U-2S

== Applications ==
- Lockheed U-2S
- Northrop Grumman B-2 Spirit

== Specifications (F118-100) ==
Data from General Electric, Aviation Week & Space Technology

==== General characteristics ====
- Type: Two Spool turbofan
- Length: 101 in (260 cm)
- Diameter: 46.5 in (118 cm)
- Dry weight: 3,200 lb (1,500 kg)

==== Components ====
- Compressor: Axial, 1 stage fan, 2 stage LP compressor, 9 stage HP compressor
- Combustors: Annular
- Turbine: 1 stage HP turbine, 2 stage LP turbine

==== Performance ====
- Maximum thrust: 19,000 lbf (85 kN)
- Overall pressure ratio: 35:1
- Thrust-to-weight ratio: 5.9:1

== See also ==
Related development

- General Electric F101
- General Electric F110

Related lists

- List of aircraft engines
