= General Electric F110 =

Aircraft engine

F110
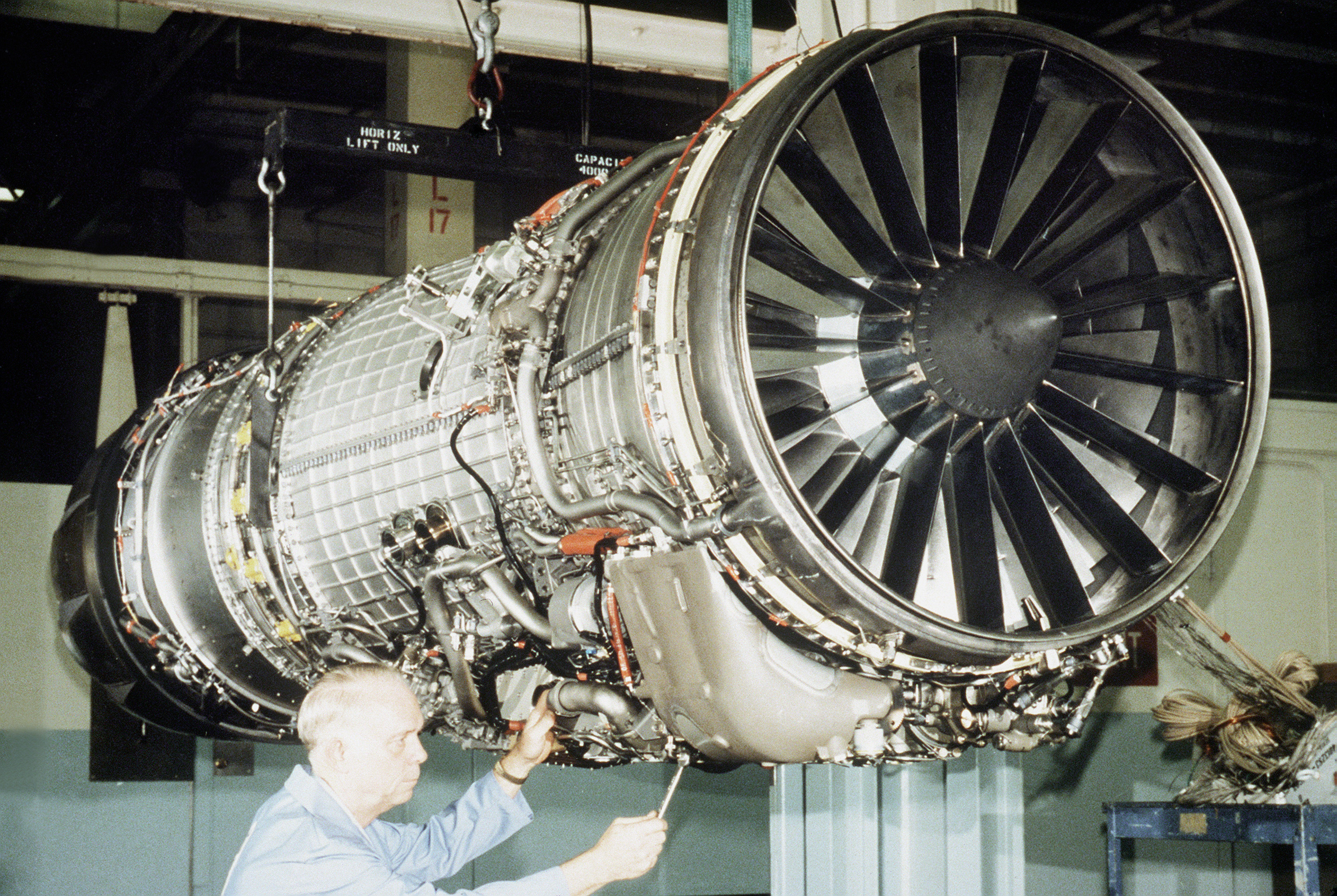
- A F110-GE-100 turbofan engine to be used in an F-16, ca.1986
- Type: Turbofan
- National origin: United States
- Manufacturer: GE Aerospace
- First run: 1980s
- Major applications: General Dynamics F-16 Fighting Falcon; Grumman F-14B/D Tomcat; McDonnell Douglas F-15E Strike Eagle; Boeing F-15EX Eagle II; Mitsubishi F-2; TAI TF Kaan Block 10
- Developed from: General Electric F101
- Variants: General Electric F118

The General Electric F110 is an afterburning turbofan jet engine produced by GE Aerospace (formerly GE Aviation). It was derived from the General Electric F101 as an alternative engine to the Pratt & Whitney F100 for powering tactical fighter aircraft, with the F-16C Fighting Falcon and F-14A+/B Tomcat being the initial platforms; the F110 would eventually power new F-15 Eagle variants as well. The engine is also built by IHI Corporation in Japan, TUSAŞ Engine Industries (TEI) in Turkey, and Samsung Techwin in South Korea as part of licensing agreements.

The F118 is a non-afterburning variant of the F110 that powers the Northrop B-2 stealth bomber and Lockheed U-2S reconnaissance aircraft.

== Design and development ==
The F110 emerged from an intersection of efforts in the 1970s by General Electric to reenter the U.S. fighter engine market and the U.S. Air Force's desire to address the reliability, longevity, and maintenance issues with the Pratt & Whitney F100 engines that powered its F-15s and F-16s. In 1975, General Electric used its own funds to begin developing the F101X, a derivative of its F101 engine for the B-1 bomber; the F101X would inherit much of the core design while having a smaller fan that was upscaled from the F404 so that its thermodynamic cycle and thrust were better suited for a fighter engine. The convergent-divergent iris nozzle was also derived from the F404.

The cancellation of the B-1A by the Carter Administration (in lieu of the Advanced Technology Bomber which became the B-2) meant a loss of business for General Electric, and provided further impetus to provide the F101X for the fighter engine market. The engine attracted the interest of the Air Force's Engine Model Derivative Program (EMDP), and in 1979 began funding it as the F101 Derivative Fighter Engine, or F101 DFE. The Air Force saw the F101 DFE as a potential alternative to the F100 and also a way to coerce better performance from Pratt & Whitney in addressing issues with the F100.

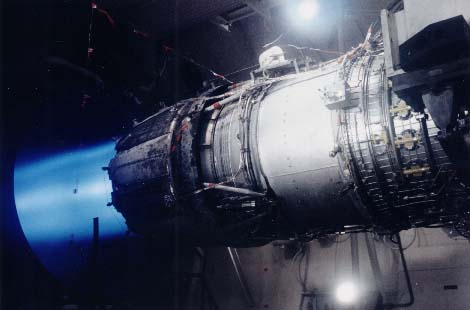
An F110 engine undergoes performance testing at the Air Force's Arnold Engineering Development Center.

Following the completion of ground tests in 1980, the F101 DFE was first fitted on an F-16 for flight testing, where it showed considerable improvement in performance and operability over the existing F100. In 1982, the Air Force began the full-scale development of the F101 DFE as an option to compete with the F100 for application in future F-15 and F-16 production; the engine was eventually selected for the F-16 and designated F110-GE-100. The threat by the F110 has been cited as a reason for Pratt & Whitney to more quickly rectify the issues affecting the F100 and developing the improved F100-PW-220 variant. Seeking to drive unit costs down and improve contractor performance, the Air Force implemented the Alternate Fighter Engine (AFE) competition between the F100 and F110 in 1983 in what was nicknamed "The Great Engine War", where the engine contract would be awarded through competition. The Air Force would buy both engines starting in 1984, with contracts being competed every fiscal year and the percentages of F100 versus F110 would vary based on contract; the competitions eventually ended in 1992.

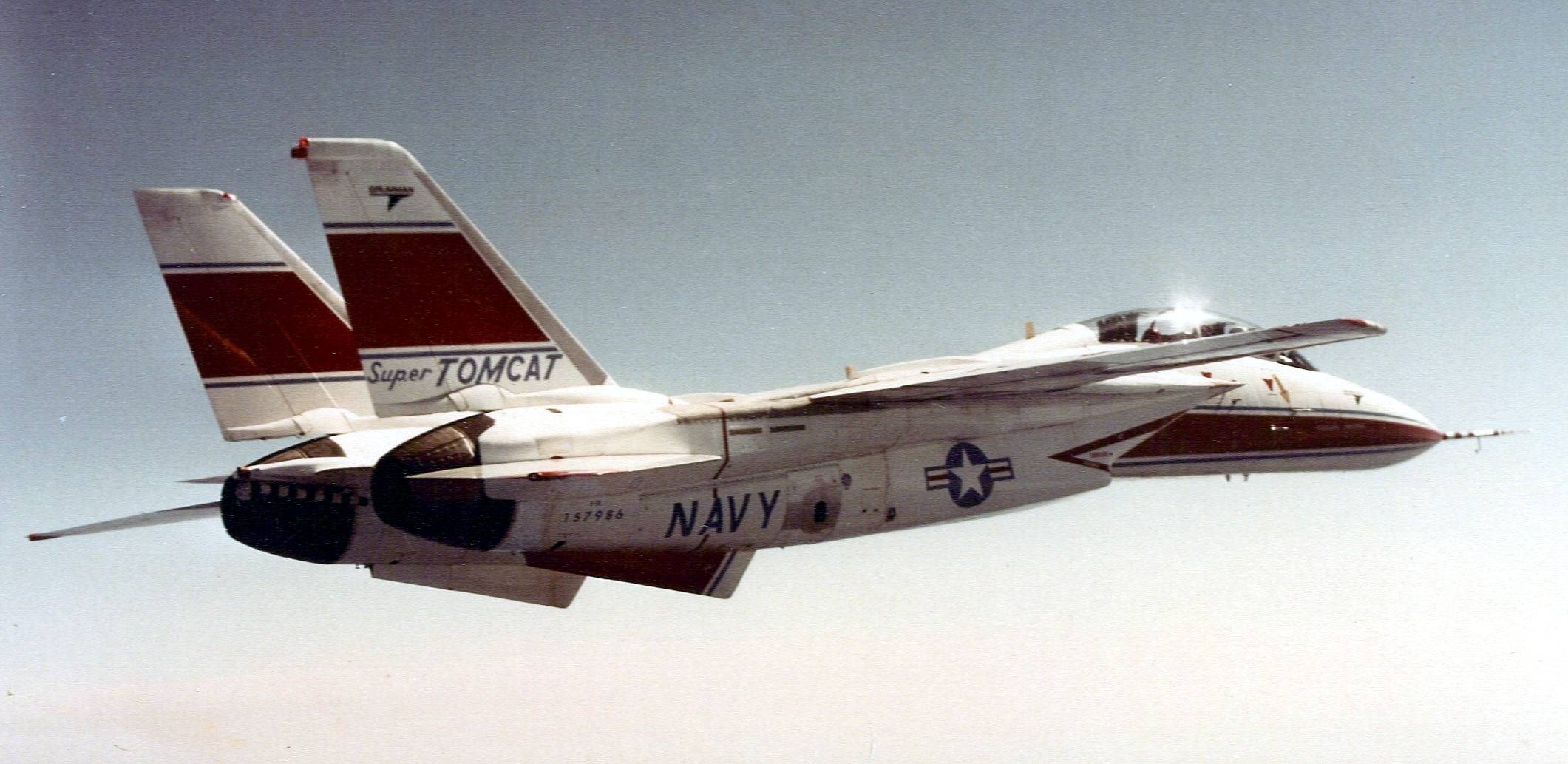
The F-14B prototype, BuNo 157986, testing the F101 DFE, which the Navy would eventually adopt as the F110-GE-400

The F101 DFE was also tested in the F-14B prototype in 1981, and the aircraft saw considerable performance improvement over the existing Pratt & Whitney TF30. Although further testing was halted by the Navy in 1982, it would use the results of the Air Force's AFE evaluation to choose the powerplant for future F-14s. The F101 DFE was eventually chosen by the Navy in 1984 and was designated F110-GE-400.

=== Design ===
Video of F110 testing

The F110-GE-100/400 is a low-bypass axial-flow afterburning turbofan. It has a 3-stage fan driven by a two-stage low-pressure turbine and a 9-stage compressor driven by a one-stage high-pressure turbine; overall pressure ratio is 30.4 and bypass ratio is 0.87. In contrast to the ambitious raw performance goals for the F100 of high thrust and low weight, the F110 placed a greater emphasis on balancing between reliability, operability, and performance. The fan and inlet guide vanes were designed to smooth airflow to increase resistance to compressor stalls. The engine has an electronic and hydromechanical control system that make it more forgiving of rapid throttle inputs. The main difference between the -100 and the -400 is the latter's augmentor section, being about 50 inches longer. The -100, used on the F-16C/D Block 30/40, had an uninstalled static thrust of 16,600 lbf (73.8 kN) in intermediate power and 28,200 lbf (125.4 kN) in afterburner; the figures for the -400, used on the F-14B/D, were 16,333 lbf (72.7 kN) and 26,950 lbf (119.9 kN) respectively.

=== Further developments ===
In the mid-1980s, the Air Force sought greater power for its tactical fighters and began Improved Performance Engine (IPE) programs for the F100 and F110, with the goal of achieving thrust in the 29,000 lbf (129 kN) class, while retaining the durability improvements achieved in the F100-220 and F110-100. The result would be the Pratt & Whitney F100-PW-229 and General Electric F110-GE-129. Compared to the F110-100, the -129 incorporated component improvements, including a full authority digital engine control (FADEC), that allowed maximum thrust to be achieved in a wider range of conditions and across larger portions of the flight envelope, while retaining 80% commonality; bypass ratio was slightly reduced to 0.76. The -129 produces 17,155 lbf (76.3 kN) of thrust in intermediate power and 29,500 lbf (131.2 kN) in full afterburner, and was first fielded in 1992 on the F-16C/D Block 50; the engine would also power enhanced F-15E variants, starting with the F-15K for South Korea.

The F110 Axisymmetric Vectoring Exhaust Nozzle in motion

A non-afterburning variant of the F110, designated the F118, would power the B-2 stealth bomber and the re-engined U-2S reconnaissance aircraft. A variant of the F110-100 fitted with a 3-dimensional axisymmetric thrust vectoring nozzle, referred by General Electric as the Axisymmetric Vectoring Exhaust Nozzle (AVEN), was tested on a specially modified F-16 called the NF-16D VISTA under the Multi-Axis Thrust-Vectoring (MATV) program; the nozzle could vector the exhaust up to 17 degrees from the axial line in any direction.

The F110 would see the development of a further enhanced variant starting in 2000 with the F110-GE-132, initially referred to as the F110-GE-129EFE (Enhanced Fighter Engine). Both the -132 and its competitor, the Pratt & Whitney F100-PW-232, were designed to make full use of the F-16's Modular Common Inlet Duct (MCID), or "Big Mouth" inlet introduced in the Block 30 variant. The -132 incorporates an improved fan that is more efficient and can increase maximum airflow, composite fan duct, durability improvements to the hot section, radial augmentor, and control system improvements. The engine leveraged research performed under the Integrated High Performance Turbine Engine Technology (IHPTET) program. The -132 produces 19,000 lbf (84.5 kN) of thrust in intermediate power and 32,500 lbf (144.6 kN) in afterburner but can also be tuned to run at -129 thrust levels to increase inspection intervals from 4,300 cycles to 6,000; the older -129 can be upgraded to the -132 configuration, with the new fan being a modular component. The F110-132 was selected to power the F-16E/F Block 60 for the United Arab Emirates. Flight tests began in 2003, and the first engine was delivered in 2005.

Technology from the -132 as well as from commercial CFM56 developments have been applied to the F110 Service Life Extension Program (SLEP), and F110-129 upgraded with SLEP technology were given the designation -129C. Further improved subvariants with 6,000-cycle intervals were designated -129D (for the F-16) and -129E (for the F-15). The -129E also powers the TAI Kaan prototype.

== Major applications ==
=== F-14 ===
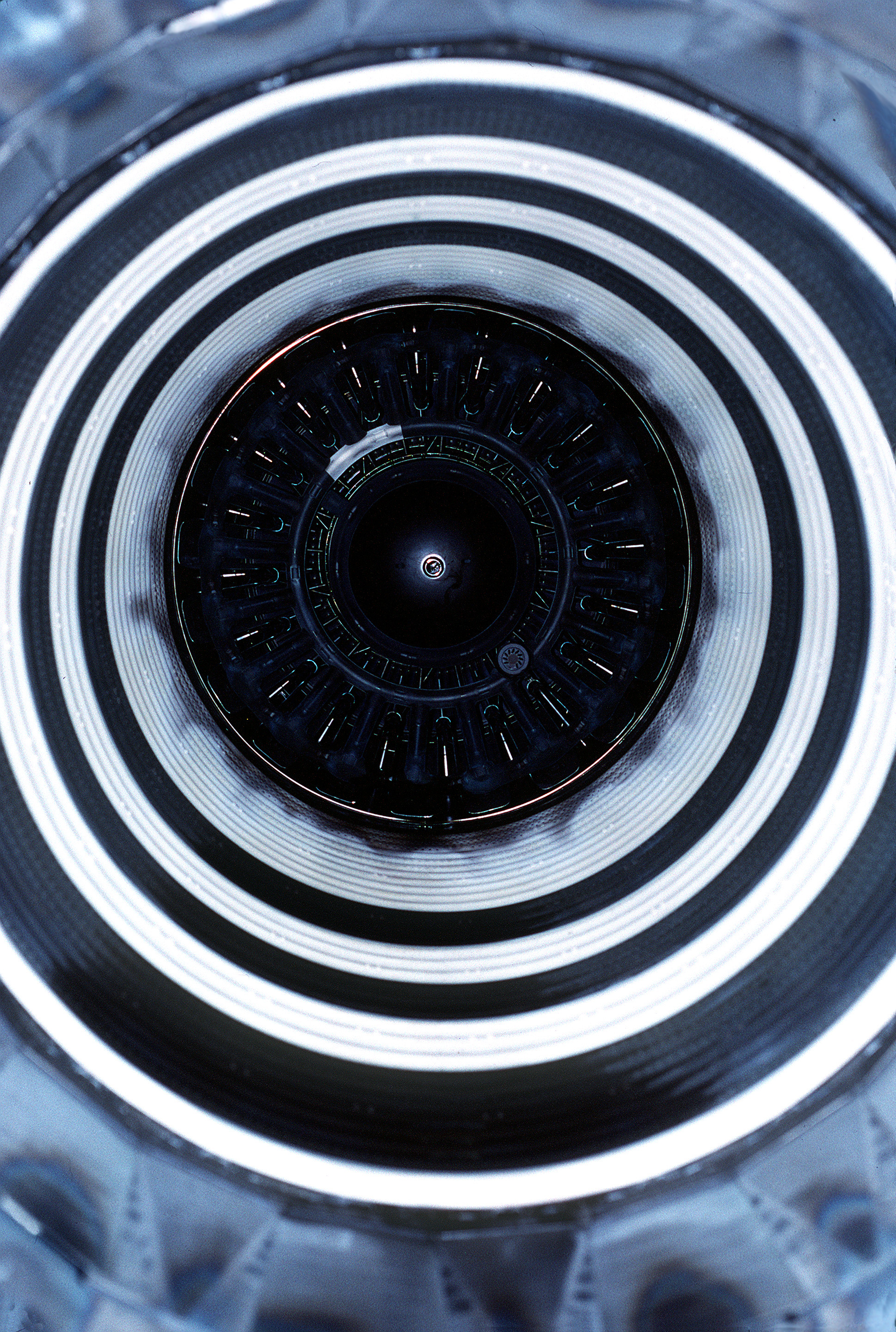
An F110-GE-400 viewed through the augmentor of a Grumman F-14D Tomcat

The F-14A entered service with the United States Navy in 1973 powered by Pratt & Whitney TF30s. By the end of the decade, following numerous problems with the original engine (and similar problems with the F100 on the F-15 and F-16), the DoD began procuring the upgraded TF30-P-414As. While these engines solved the serviceability problems, the fuel consumption and thrust was comparable to the initial model—considerably less than what the F-14 had been designed for; the F-14's originally planned Pratt & Whitney F401, an upscaled naval development of the F100 design, was also canceled due to costs and reliability issues.

After reviewing the results of the Air Force's AFE evaluation, the Navy would choose the F101 DFE to re-engine the F-14 in 1984, with the variant designated the F110-GE-400; the primary difference between the -400 and the Air Force's F110-GE-100 is length — the -400 had a 50-inch (1.3 m) tailpipe extension to suit the F-14 airframe, which was fitted downstream of the augmentor. During initial years of service, the -400's lengthened tailpipe created unanticipated hot spots in the afterburner liner, resulting in the loss of several F-14s before the issue was rectified. The engine produced 26,950 lbf (119.9 kN) of uninstalled thrust with afterburner; installed thrust is 23,400 lbf (104.1 kN) with afterburner at sea level, which rose to 30,200 lbf (134.3 kN) at Mach 0.9. This was similar to the F-14's originally intended F401 and provided a significant increase over the TF30's maximum uninstalled thrust of 20,900 lbf (93 kN). These upgraded jets were initially known as F-14A+ before being re-designated as the F-14B, as were new production aircraft powered by the F110. The same engine also powered the final variant of the aircraft, the F-14D.

Proposed upgraded variants of the F-14, such as the Super Tomcat 21 (ST-21), were to be powered by the F110-GE-429, the naval variant of the F110-GE-129 IPE.

=== F-16 ===
The F-16 Fighting Falcon entered service powered by the Pratt & Whitney F100 afterburning turbofan. Seeking a way to drive unit costs down, the USAF implemented the Alternate Fighter Engine (AFE) program in 1984, under which the engine contract would be awarded through competition. As of June 2005, the F110 powered 86% of the USAF's F-16C/Ds. While the F110-GE-100 can provide around 4,000 lbf (17.8 kN) more thrust than the F100-PW-200, it requires more airflow for the jet to fully exploit the engine; the standard normal shock inlet (NSI) limited the F110 to 25,735 lbf (114.5 kN). This led to the increase in the area of the engine inlet for the new Modular Common Inlet Duct (MCID). The F-16C/D Block 30/32s were the first to be built with a common engine bay, able to accept both engines, with Block 30s having the bigger MCID inlet (also known as "Big Mouth") for the F110 and Block 32s retaining the standard inlet for the F100.

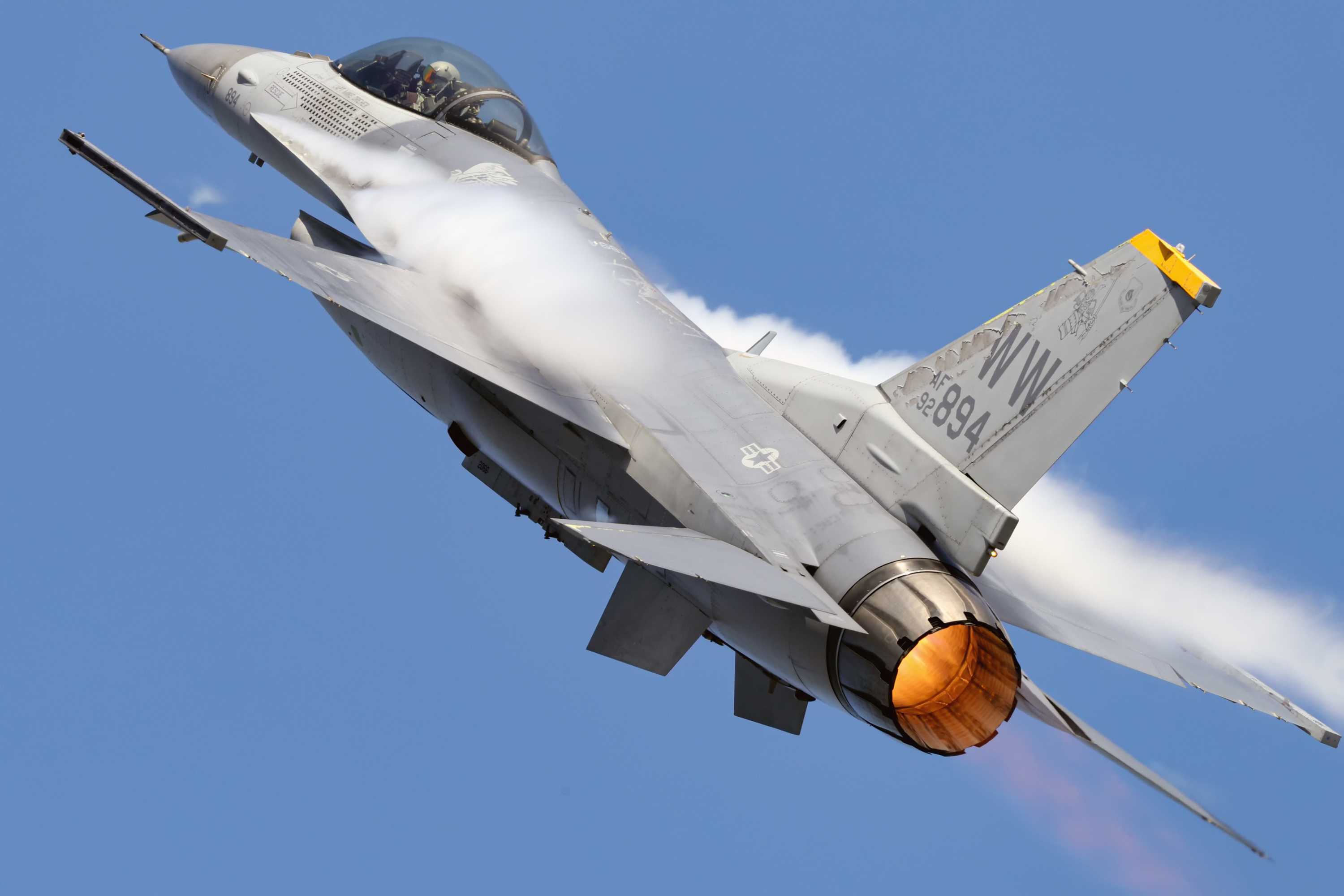
An F-16C Block 50 fitted with the F110-GE-129.

The F-16C/D Block 30 and 40 were powered by the 28,200 lbf (125.4 kN) F110-GE-100, while the Block 50 was powered by the 29,500 lbf (131.2 kN) F110-GE-129 IPE. The United Arab Emirates' F-16E/F Block 60 is powered by the 32,500 lbf (144.6 kN) F110-GE-132, as was the proposed Lockheed Martin-Tata F-21, based on the Block 60 and initially designated F-16IN, for the Indian Air Force MMRCA competition. Current production F-16C Block 70 are equipped with the F110-129D with increased lifespan and durability.

Two derivatives of the F-16, the Mitsubishi F-2 and the General Dynamics F-16XL, are powered by the -129 IPE. The engines for the F-2 were license-built by IHI Corporation and designated F110-IHI-129, prior to the reporting of an IHI company whistleblower in February 2024. On April 24, 2024, IHI announced that investigation was underway by Japan's Ministry of Land, Infrastructure, Transport and Tourism of its subsidiary, IHI Power Systems Co., which had falsified its engine data since 2003, impacting over 4,000 engines globally.

=== F-15 ===
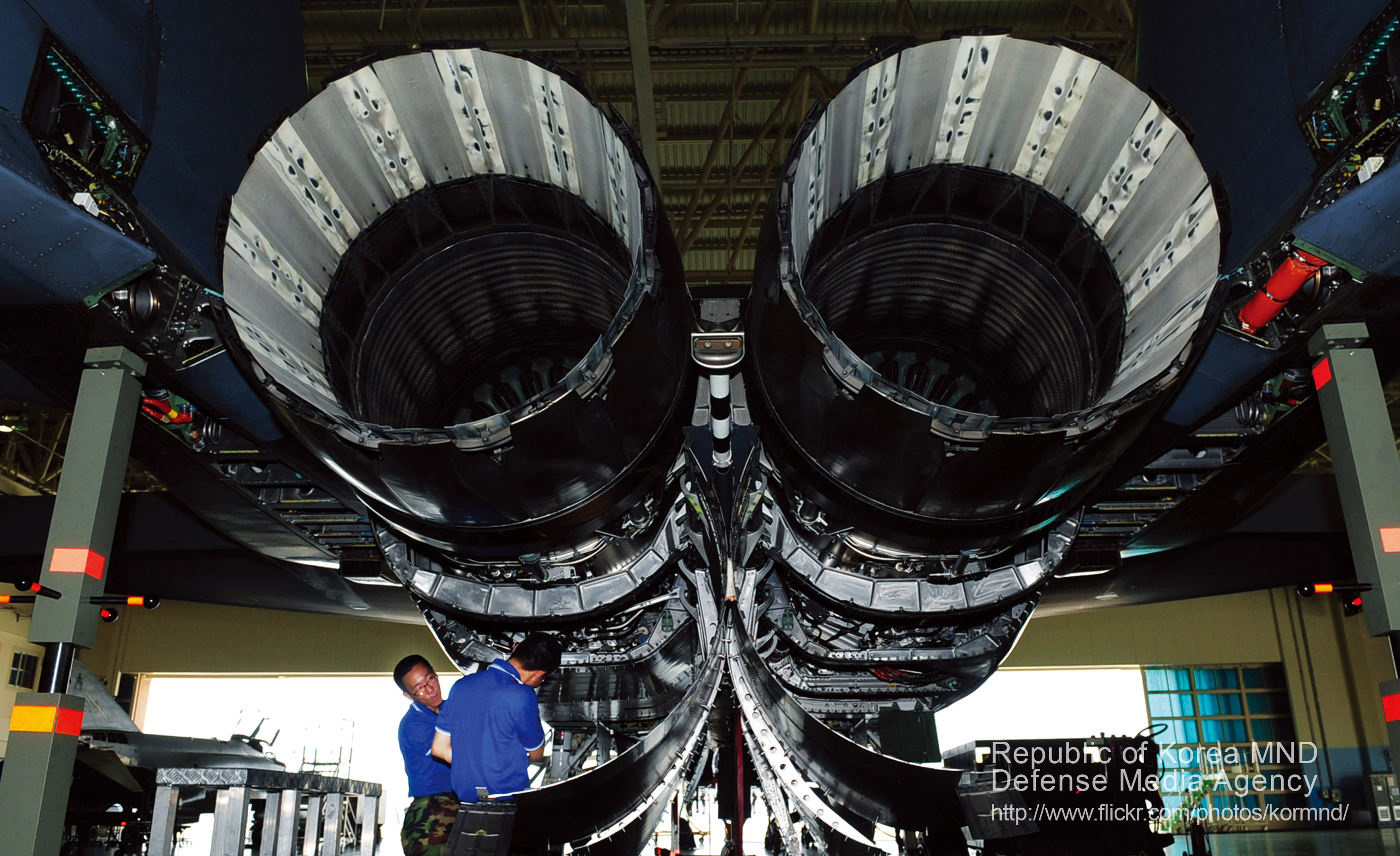
A South Korean F-15K with two F110-GE-129 engines fitted.

Although the Air Force chose the Pratt & Whitney F100-PW-229 as the IPE for the F-15E Strike Eagle, a pair of F110-GE-129s were mounted on one aircraft for flight testing. South Korea would choose the -129 to power 40 F-15K fighters, the first time production F-15s were powered by a General Electric engine. The engines were manufactured through a joint licensing agreement with Samsung Techwin Company. It has also been chosen by the Republic of Singapore Air Force (RSAF) to power its F-15SG.

The F-15E would be further developed into the Advanced Eagle with a new fly-by-wire control system that incorporates the F110-GE-129's FADEC. The Advanced Eagle with the F110-129E would be the basis for Saudi Arabia's F-15SA, Qatar's F-15QA, and the U.S. Air Force's F-15EX.

== Variants ==
- F110-GE-100: Initial variant resulting from the F101 DFE (Derivative Fighter Engine), powers the F-16 Block 30 and 40.
- F110-GE-400: Naval variant of the -100 with a 50” augmentor extension to fit the F-14, powers the F-14A+ (later designated F-14B) and F-14D.
- F110-GE-129: Improved performance engine variant, powers the F-16 Block 50 and 70 and the F-15K, SG, SA, QA, and EX.
- F110-GE-132: Further enhanced thrust variant powering the F-16 Block 60.

== Applications ==
- General Dynamics F-16 Fighting Falcon
- General Dynamics F-16XL
- Grumman F-14A+ (F-14B) and F-14D Super Tomcat
- McDonnell Douglas F-15E Strike Eagle and Boeing F-15EX Eagle II
- Mitsubishi F-2
- TAI TF Kaan Block 10

== Specifications ==
=== F110-GE-100/400 ===
Data from American Society of Mechanical Engineers, Naval Air Systems Command (NAVAIR)

==== General characteristics ====
- Type: Afterburning turbofan
- Length: 181.9 in (462 cm) for -100, 232 in (589 cm) for -400
- Diameter: 35.66 in (90.6 cm) inlet, 46.5 in (118.1 cm) overall
- Dry weight: 3,830 lb (1,740 kg) for -100, 4,183 lb (1,897 kg) for -400

==== Components ====
- Compressor: 2 spool, 3-stage fan and 9-stage HPC
- Combustors: Annular
- Turbine: 1-stage HPT and 2-stage LPT
- Bypass ratio: 0.87:1

==== Performance ====
- Maximum thrust:
  - -100: 16,600 lbf (73.8 kN) intermediate, 28,200 lbf (125.4 kN) full afterburner
  - -400: 16,333 lbf (72.7 kN) intermediate, 26,950 lbf (119.9 kN) full afterburner
- Overall pressure ratio: 30.4:1
- Air mass flow: 270 lb/s (122.4 kg/s), 254 lb/s (115.2 kg/s) with small F-16 inlet
- Thrust-to-weight ratio: 4.33:1 intermediate power, 7.36:1 in afterburner

=== F110-GE-129 ===
Data from General Electric, American Society of Mechanical Engineers (ASME), MTU

==== General characteristics ====
- Type: Afterburning turbofan
- Length: 181.9 in (462 cm)
- Diameter: 46.5 in (118.1 cm)
- Dry weight: 3,920 lb (1,780 kg)

==== Components ====
- Compressor: 2 spool, 3-stage fan and 9-stage HPC
- Combustors: Annular
- Turbine: 1-stage HPT and 2-stage LPT
- Bypass ratio: 0.76:1

==== Performance ====
- Maximum thrust:
  - Intermediate power: 17,155 lbf (76.3 kN)
  - Full afterburner: 29,500 lbf (131.2 kN)
- Overall pressure ratio: 30.7:1
- Air mass flow: 270 lb/s (122.4 kg/s)
- Turbine inlet temperature: 2,750 °F (1,510 °C; 1,780 K)
- Thrust-to-weight ratio: 4.38:1 intermediate power, 7.50:1 in afterburner

=== F110-GE-132 ===
Data from General Electric, American Society of Mechanical Engineers (ASME), Forecast International

==== General characteristics ====
- Type: Afterburning turbofan
- Length: 181.9 in (462 cm)
- Diameter: 46.5 in (118.1 cm)
- Dry weight: 4,050 lb (1,840 kg)

==== Components ====
- Compressor: 2 spool, 3-stage fan and 9-stage HPC
- Combustors: Annular
- Turbine: 1-stage HPT and 2-stage LPT
- Bypass ratio: 0.68:1

==== Performance ====
- Maximum thrust:
  - Intermediate power: 19,000 lbf (84.5 kN)
  - Full afterburner: 32,500 lbf (144.6 kN)
- Overall pressure ratio: 33.3:1
- Air mass flow: 275 lb/s (124.7 kg/s)
- Thrust-to-weight ratio: 4.69:1 intermediate power, 8.02:1 in afterburner

== See also ==
Related development

- General Electric F101
- General Electric F118

Comparable engines

- Pratt & Whitney F100
- Pratt & Whitney F401
- Saturn AL-31
- Shenyang WS-10

Related lists

- List of aircraft engines
