= General Electric LMS100 =

Gas Turbine

LMS100
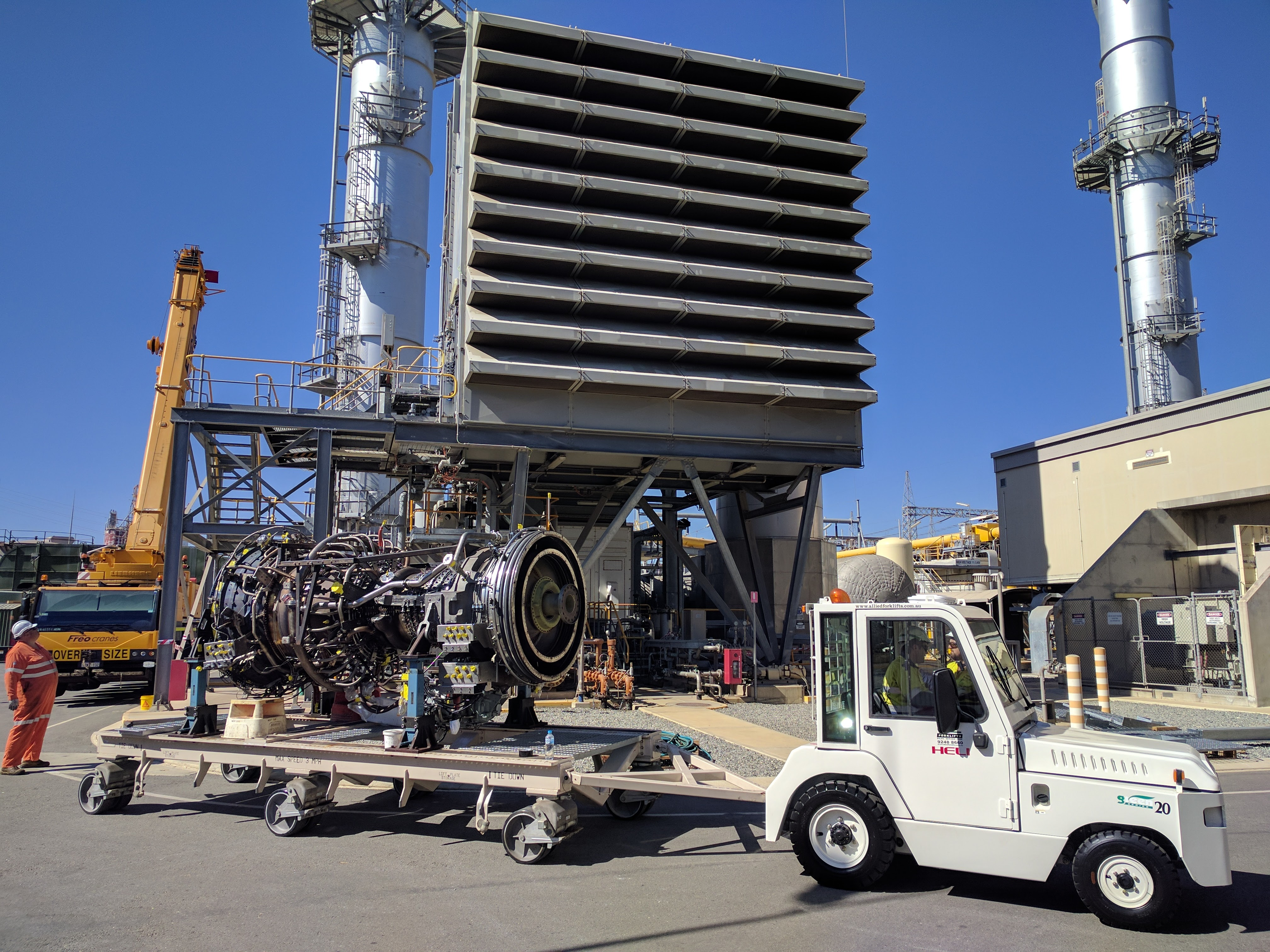
- GE LMS100PA Supercore on maintenance dolly
- Type: Gas turbine
- National origin: United States
- Manufacturer: General Electric
- First run: 2000s
- Developed from: General Electric LM6000

The General Electric LMS100 is an aero derivative gas turbine produced by GE Vernova.

== Design and development ==
The LMS100 PA produces approximately 100 MW at an efficiency of around 46% LHV in open cycle operation. It is currently the largest and most efficient aero-derivative gas turbine. It is able to produce full rated power in under 10 minutes.

The LMS100 comprises a low-pressure compressor, an intercooler, a supercore and a power turbine. The supercore (comprising a HP compressor, compressor rear frame, high-pressure turbine and intermediate pressure turbine) is a further development of the LM6000, which in turn was based on the CF6-80C2. The low-pressure compressor is from the 6FA industrial gas turbine.

The first LMS100 engine entered commercial operation in July 2006 and a second unit in 2008. Other operational LMS100 power stations are at Laredo, TX (USA), El Paso, TX (USA), Firebaugh, CA (USA), Waterbury, CT (USA), Santiago (Chile), Güemes (Argentina) YPF Añello (2) (Argentina), Loma Campana, (2) Neuquen (Argentina), Edmonton (Canada), Calpine Corporation's Cumberland station in Millville, New Jersey, Stratford Power Station in New Zealand (opened in May 2011), Kwinana Power Station in Western Australia (opened in 2012), Dzhubginskaya, Russia (opened in 2013), and Tempe, AZ (5) (USA) (operational in 2019). LADWP (multiple sites, Long Beach (6), Playa Del Rey (2), City of Industry (5) ) Palm Springs (8), Otay Mesa (3) Excellon (2) Massachusetts

The LMS100 PA gas turbines utilize water injection for NOx control. The LMS100 PB gas turbine uses dry low NOx (DLE) combustors. The first LMS100 PB unit entered commercial operation in 2013.

== See also ==
Related development

- General Electric CF6
- General Electric LM2500
- General Electric LM6000

Related lists

- List of aircraft engines
