= General Electric TF39 =

Turbofan aircraft engine

TF39
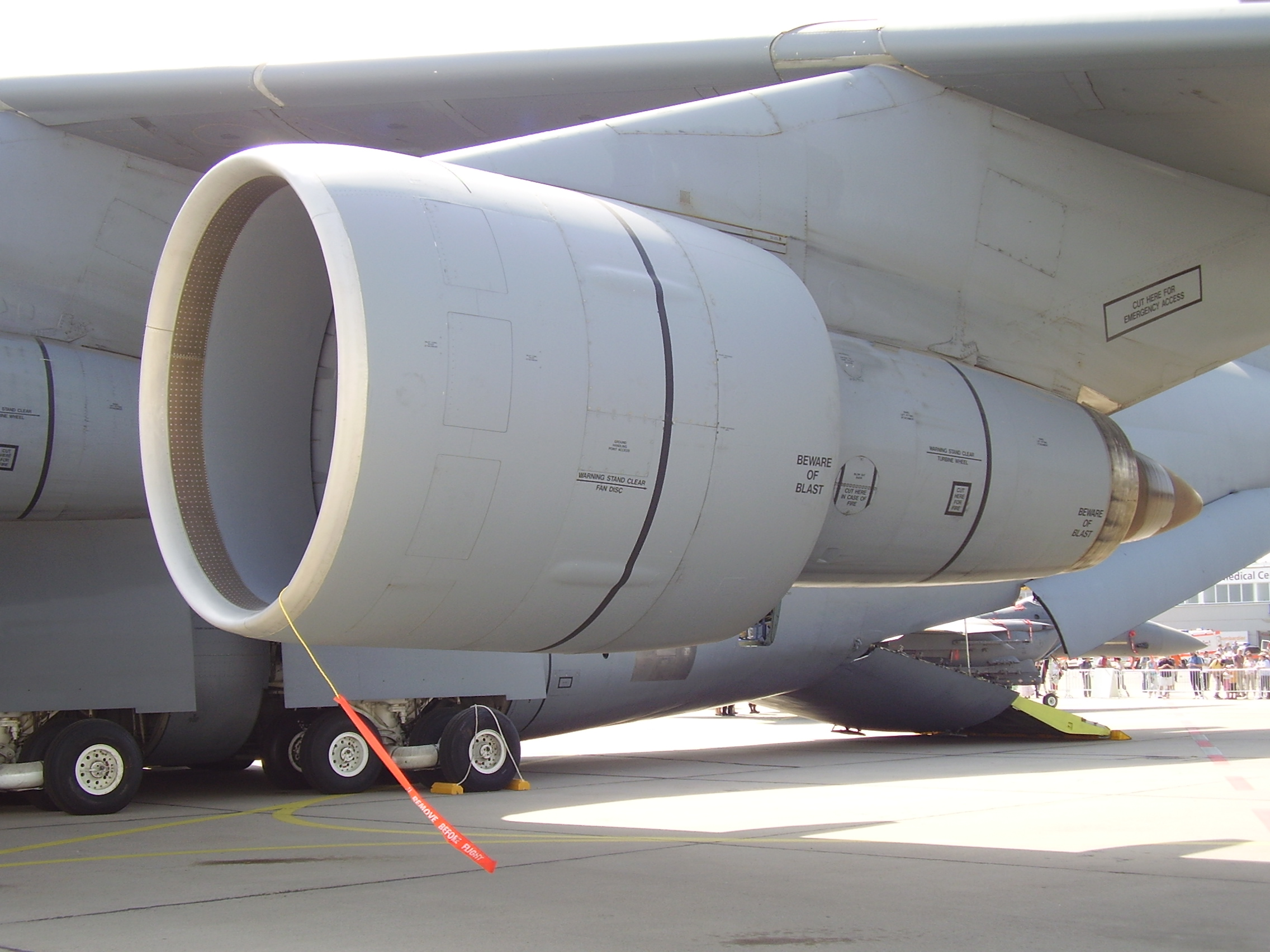
- A TF39 on a C-5 Galaxy at ILA (Internationale Luftfahrtausstellung) in Berlin, 2008
- Type: High-bypass turbofan
- National origin: United States
- Manufacturer: GE Aviation
- First run: 1965
- Major applications: Lockheed C-5 Galaxy
- Status: Withdrawn from service, retired
- Number built: 463
- Developed into: General Electric CF6; General Electric LM2500; General Electric LM6000

The General Electric TF39 was a high-bypass turbofan engine that was developed to power the Lockheed C-5 Galaxy. It was the first high-bypass jet engine to enter service, becoming operational on the Galaxy fleet in 1970. With further modifications, it became the civilian General Electric CF6, entering service in 1971 on the McDonnell Douglas DC-10, and seeing use in a wide variety of aircraft from Boeing and Airbus. The internal power section, with the front fan removed, formed the General Electric LM2500 marine turbine. The last TF39 was produced in March 2016, and the last operational use of the engine was the next year, after the Galaxy fleet was re-engined with the F138, a derivative of the CF6.

== Development ==
=== Early work on fan designs ===
By the early 1960s, General Electric had not had much success in the cargo and passenger engine market, with its only success on the civilian side being a small number of engines for the Convair 880, the CJ805-3, a civilianized version of the successful military J79. At the time, Pratt & Whitney dominated the civilian market, and to address this the new Rolls-Royce Conway was being introduced for civilian use, offering both higher power and better fuel economy. Pratt & Whitney was responding with their JT3D, similar to the Conway in most ways.

These designs had a significant advantage over the J79-derived CJ805. A key issue for early jet engines was that it was difficult to maintain efficiency in the axial compressor as it grew larger in response to demands for more powerful engines. P&W and RR had solved this using what is essentially two engines, one inside the other, the inner one operating at higher rotational speeds. These two-spool designs allowed each part of the engine to operate more closely to its ideal design point. GE had taken an entirely different approach to solve this problem, the variable stator concept in which the geometry of the compressor section could be changed to address changes in operating conditions. This layout had the disadvantage that the lower-speed outer section of the other engines could be used to drive a fan, while the higher-speed single shaft of the J79 made this more difficult.

When Convair returned to GE for a more powerful engine for their updated Convair 990 Coronado, GE responded with the CJ805-23. To improve thrust, a fan section was added to the rear of the engine, powered by the exhaust from the original -3 core. It was, essentially a second passive engine bolted to the rear end of the original J79 core. While this resulted in a higher weight for the same sort of fan, GE was able to improve on the RR and P&W designs by taking advantage of recent NASA work on transonic fan designs. While effective, delays in the 990 program led to the airline companies turning to the Boeing 707 and Douglas DC-8 for most sales, and only about 100 990s were purchased. With no other design wins, CJ805 production ended in 1962. It is estimated that GE lost $80 million on the 805 program.

=== New concept ===
The fan for the TF39 had its origins in the lift-fan technology demonstrated by GE in the XV-5 Vertifan aircraft. This aircraft had two X353-5 engines, each consisting of a 62.5-inch-diameter lift-fan driven by a J85 engine. The exhaust of the J85 blew across the outside of the fans, spinning them. The bypass ratio in VTOL operation was 12.3. This tip-turbine driven lift-fan concept was turned 90 degrees and developed as an 80-inch-diameter "cruise fan" demonstrator, driven by a J79 gas generator.

In 1963, further development using the J79 led to experiments with a large front-mounted fan. After it ran successfully, Gerhard Neumann, leader of the engine division, visited Major General Marvin Demler, commander of USAF Research and Technology Division, and showed him a design for an engine with a much larger fan, which would be twice as powerful as any jet engine in the world. The 8 to 1 bypass ratio would also improve fuel economy by about 25% over existing designs. Neumann stated the design would completely revolutionize air transportation.

At the time, the Air Force was starting development of the CX-X concept, a super-large aircraft that would demand enormous power. For the CX-X program GE demonstrated a half-scale engine, the GE1/6, with 15,830 lb thrust and an sfc of 0.336. This was developed into the TF39 with a 97 in diameter fan. A number of designs were entered, and in 1965 the contract was awarded to the bid from Lockheed and GE. While this was a huge success for GE, Neumann felt that development of the TF39, along with their winning entry for the Boeing 2707 supersonic transport, meant that they had too much work on their plate to enter a design for the Boeing 747 design.

The high-bypass substantially improved the thrust and fuel consumption compared to the CJ805. It had two and a half times the thrust, while improving fuel efficiency by about 25%. The first engine went for testing in 1965. Between 1968 and 1971, 463 TF39-1 and -1A engines were produced and delivered to power the C-5A fleet.

The TF39 core was used for the CF6 series of engines, and the LM2500, LM5000, and LM6000 marine and industrial gas turbines.

== Design ==
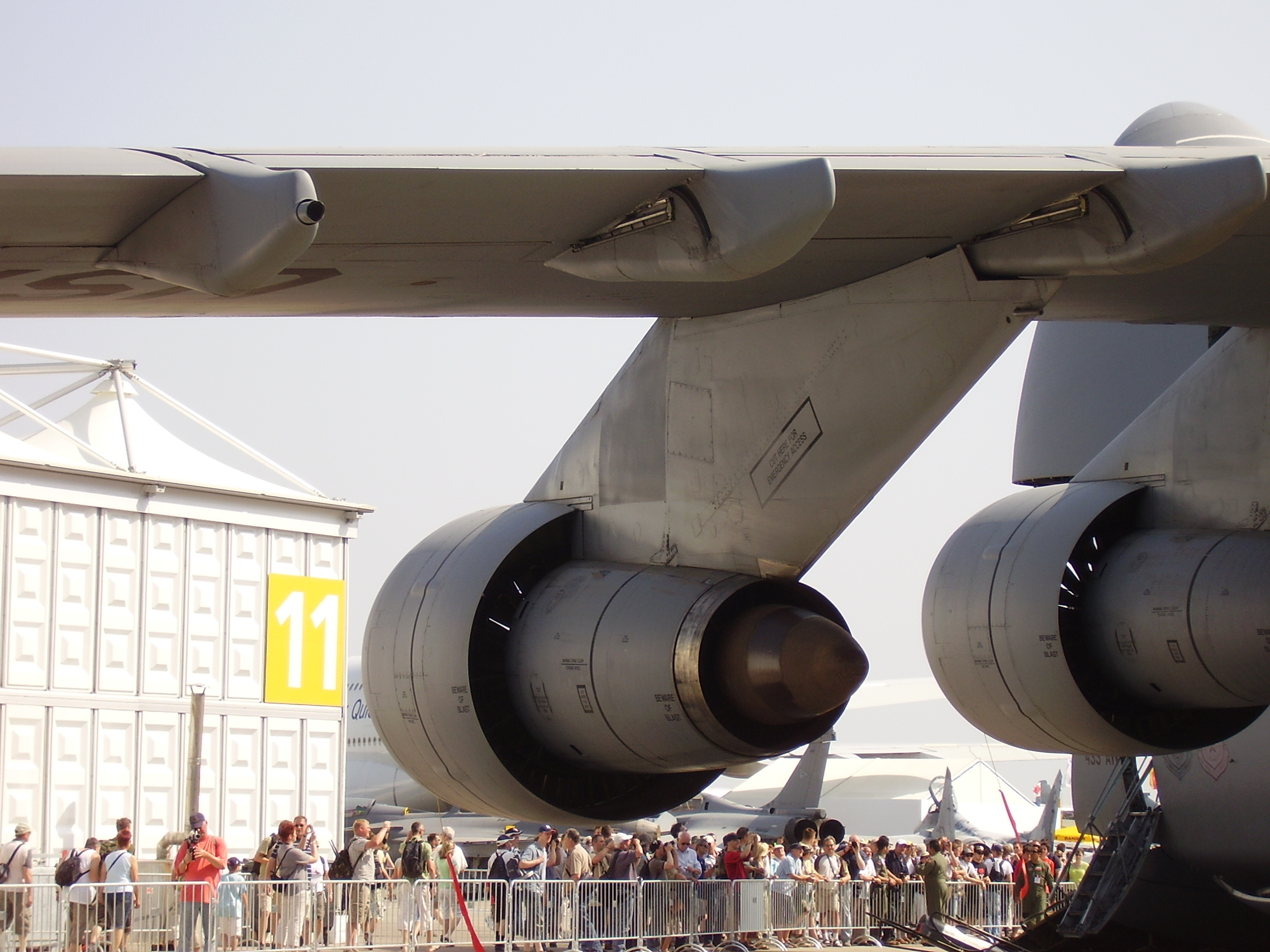
TF39s on a C-5 Galaxy, from the rear

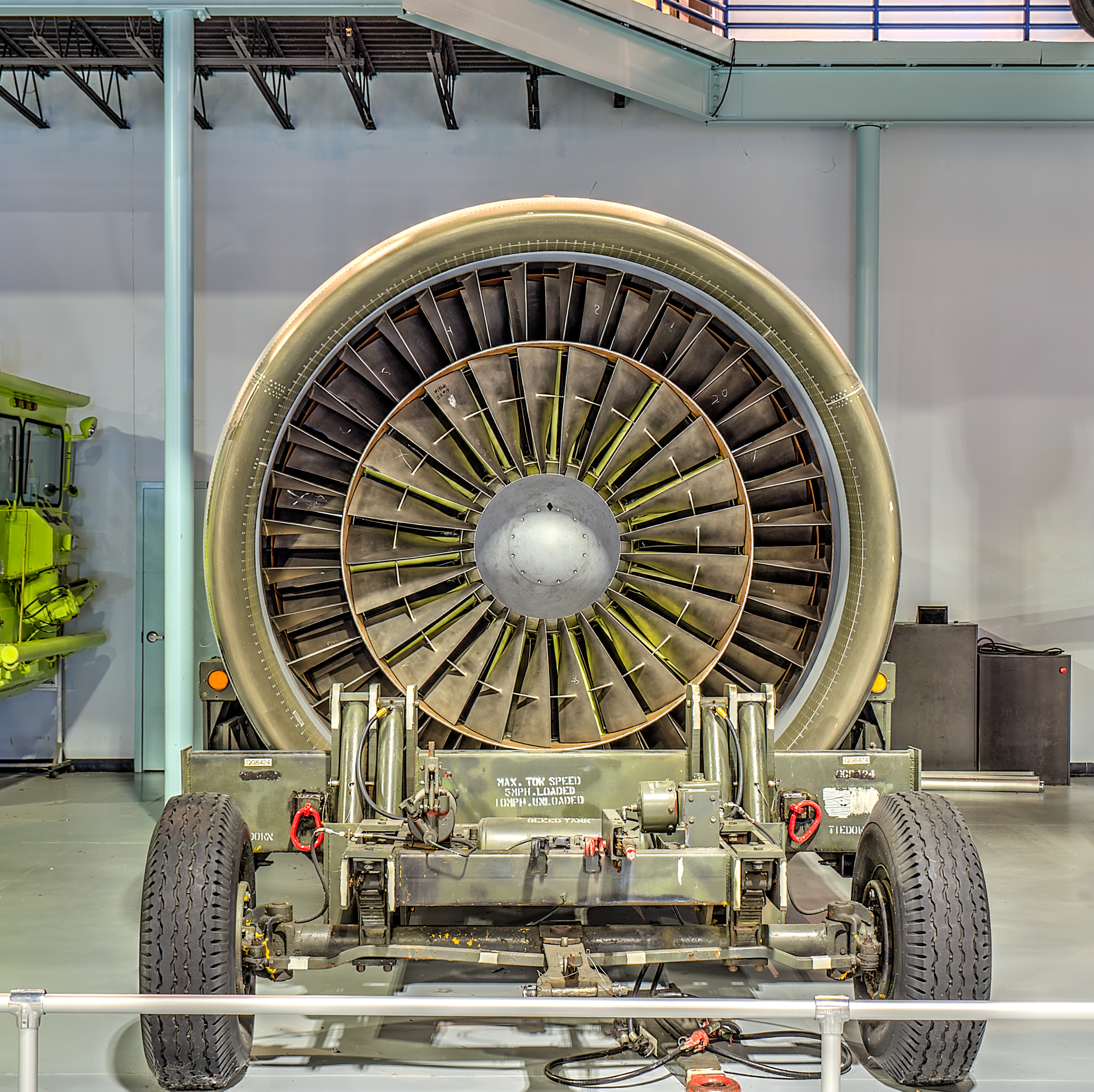
TF-39 on display at the Museum of Aviation View looking into the fan showing snubbered blades on the inner half-stage and inlet guide vanes in the outer duct in front of the full stage.

The TF39 produced 41,000 to 43,000 lb (191 to 205 kN) of thrust. It had an 8:1 bypass ratio, a 25:1 compressor pressure ratio, and a 2,500 °F (1,370 °C) turbine temperature made possible by the latest cooling technology.

The engine included features developed from previous GE engines:

- Variable stator vanes (used in the J79/CJ805)
- Turbine cooling techniques (more advanced than used on the YJ93)
- Cascade-type thrust reverser (from the CJ805)
- Snubbered first stage fan blades (snubbers, or mid-span shrouds, had been introduced by GE on the YJ93 first stage compressor blades)

By modern standards the Low Pressure Compressor on the TF-39 is unique as a single T-stage is mounted upstream of the fan rotor, rather than behind it. Although this T-stage supercharges the inner section of the fan rotor, not all of this airstream enters the High Pressure Compressor as a fair proportion also enters the bypass duct to supplement the air discharging from the outer section of the fan. In other words there are three streams leaving the fan, two of which enter the bypass duct.

== Operational history ==
On September 7, 2017, the last C-5A powered with TF39 engines made its final flight to Davis-Monthan Air Force Base for retirement. The only application for the TF39, the Galaxy military transport, was re-engined with the more modern F138-GE-102, a military version of the General Electric CF6-80C2. Re-engining for the whole fleet took place from 2008 to 2018.

== Applications ==
- Lockheed C-5A/B/C Galaxy

== Specifications (TF39-1C) ==
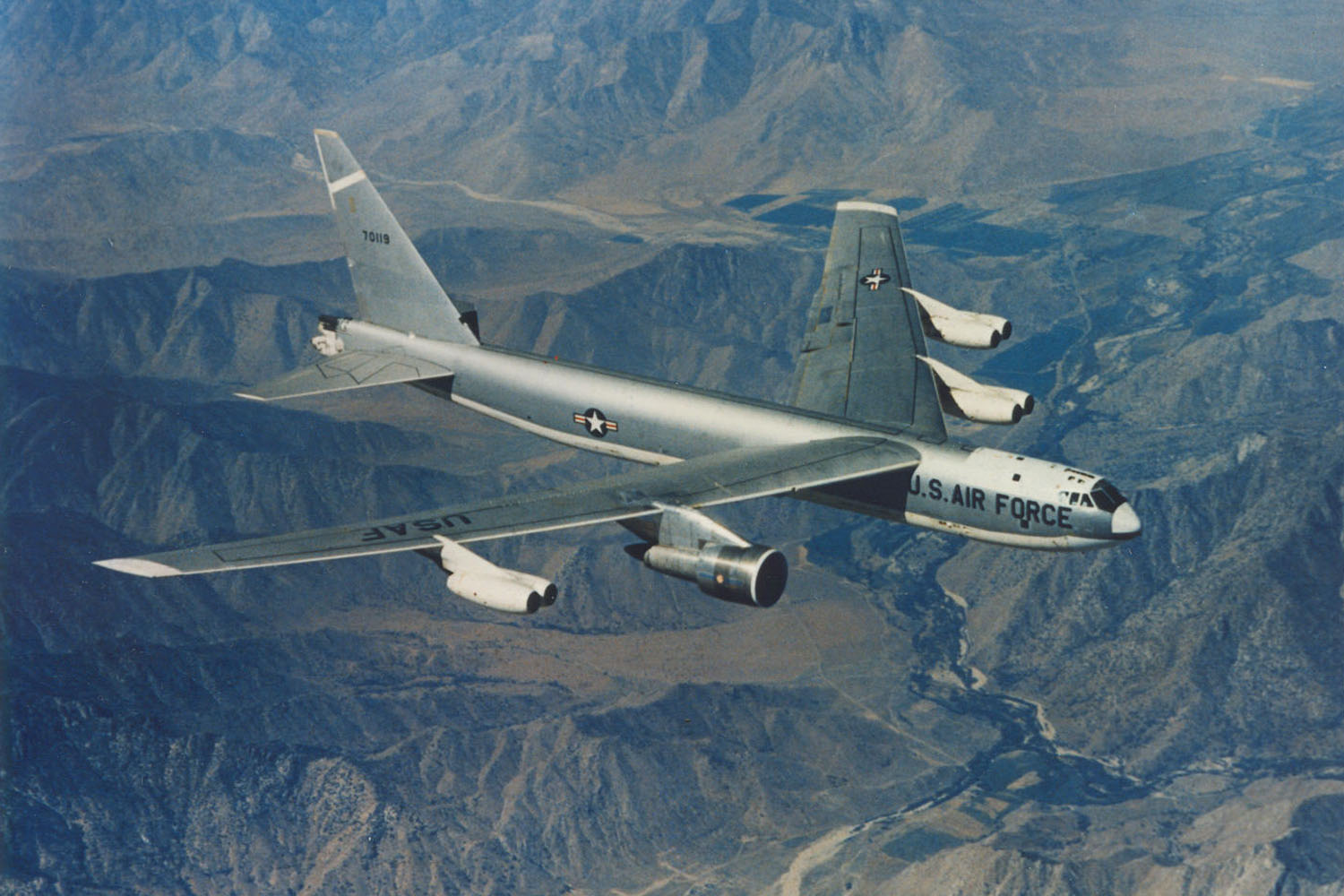
A Boeing B-52E (Serial Number 57-0119) testing a TF39 on the right inboard engine pylon. The TF39 has more than double the thrust of the two Pratt & Whitney J57s that were normally on all four pylons.

Data from

==== General characteristics ====
- Type: Turbofan
- Length: 312 in (792 cm)
- Diameter: 97 in (246 cm)
- Dry weight: 8000 lb (3630 kg)

==== Components ====
- Compressor: Axial, low pressure compressor, comprising single stage booster and a single stage fan, 16-stage high-pressure compressor
- Combustors: Annular
- Turbine: Axial, 2-stage high-pressure turbine, 6-stage low-pressure turbine

==== Performance ====
- Maximum thrust: 43,300 lbf (193 kN)
- Overall pressure ratio: 25:1
- Fuel consumption: ~3.7646 lb/s (1.7075 kg/s)
- Specific fuel consumption: 0.313 lb/(lbf⋅h) (8.9 g/(kN⋅s))
- Thrust-to-weight ratio: 5.4

== See also ==
Related development

- General Electric CF6
- General Electric LM2500

Comparable engines

- Pratt & Whitney JT9D
- Progress D-18T
- Rolls-Royce RB211

Related lists

- List of aircraft engines
