= Pratt & Whitney JT9D =

Turbofan aircraft engine first flown in 1968

JT9D
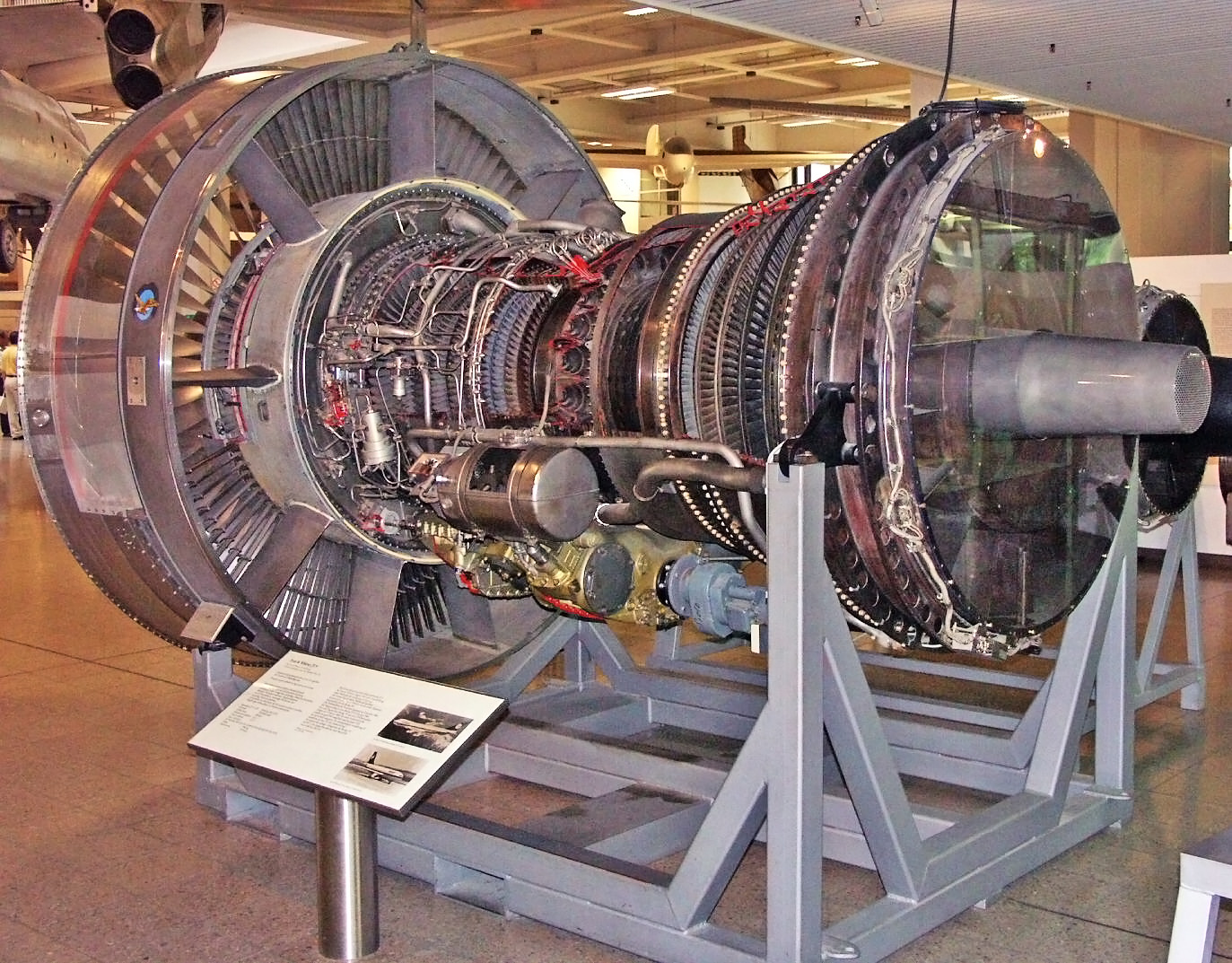
- The internal structure of the JT9D
- Type: Turbofan
- National origin: United States
- Manufacturer: Pratt & Whitney
- First run: December 1966
- Major applications: Airbus A300/A310; Boeing 747; Boeing 767; McDonnell Douglas DC-10
- Number built: >3,200
- Developed into: Pratt & Whitney PW2000; Pratt & Whitney PW4000

The Pratt & Whitney JT9D engine was the first high bypass ratio jet engine to power a wide-body airliner. Its initial application was the Boeing 747-100, the first "jumbo jet". It was Pratt & Whitney's first high-bypass-ratio turbofan.

== Development ==
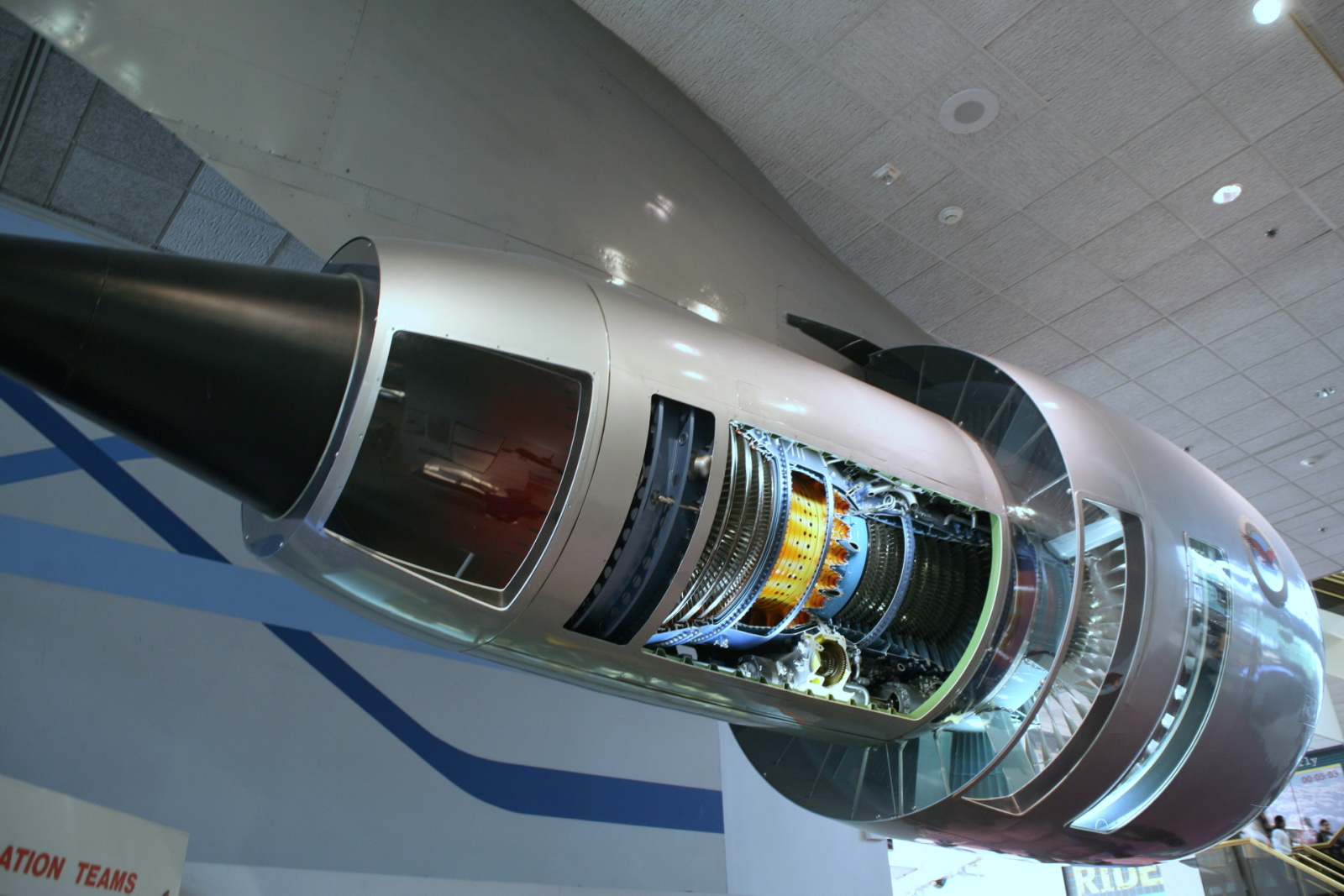
The Pratt & Whitney JT9D high-bypass turbofan engine was developed for the Boeing 747

The JT9D program was launched in September 1965 and the first engine was tested in December 1966. It received its FAA certification in May 1969 and entered service in January 1970 on the Boeing 747. It subsequently powered the Boeing 767, Airbus A300 and Airbus A310, and McDonnell Douglas DC-10. The enhanced JT9D-7R4 was introduced in September 1982 and was approved for 180-minute ETOPS for twinjets in June 1985. By 2020, the JT9D had flown more than 169 million hours. Production ceased in 1990, to be replaced by the new PW4000.

The JT9D was developed from the STF200/JTF14 demonstrator engines. The JTF14 engine had been proposed for the C-5 Galaxy program but the production contract was awarded to the General Electric TF39. The engine's first test run took place in a test rig at East Hartford, Connecticut, with the engine's first flight in June 1968 mounted on a Boeing B-52E which served as a JT9D flying testbed. In 1968, its unit cost was $800,000, $7.4 million today.

== Design ==
Alternate engine nacelle design on JT9D-70As of a Scandinavian Airlines 747-200

The JT9D introduced advanced technologies in structures, aerodynamics, and materials, which included titanium alloys and nickel alloys, to improve fuel efficiency and reliability compared to the Pratt & Whitney JT3D earlier turbofan. The engine featured a single-stage fan, a three-stage low-pressure compressor, and an eleven-stage high-pressure compressor coupled to a two-stage high-pressure turbine and four-stage low-pressure turbine. The JT9D-3, the earliest certified version of the engine, weighed 8,470 lb (3,840 kg) and produced 43,500 lbf (193 kN) thrust.

Pratt & Whitney faced difficulties with the JT9D design during the Boeing 747 test program. Engine failures during the flight test program resulted in thirty aircraft being parked outside the factory with concrete blocks hanging from the pylons, awaiting redesigned engines. Boeing and Pratt & Whitney worked together in 1969 to solve the problem. The trouble was traced to ovalization, in which stresses during takeoff caused the engine casing to deform into an oval shape resulting in rubbing of high-pressure turbine blade tips. This was solved by strengthening the engine casing and adding yoke-shaped thrust links.

JT9D engines powering USAF Boeing E-4A airborne command posts were designated F105.

In 1973, NAVSEA selected the JT9D-70 for use as a high efficiency gas turbine in the 30,000 hp to 50,000 hp class, installing its compressor into the pre-existing FT4 marine gas turbine to create the FT9. The engine had been recommended for provisional acceptance in June 1980, with full acceptance pending for ship-specific installation. The engine was selected by the Navy for use in Rohr Marine's 3,000 ton Surface Effect Ship, and one was to be installed aboard the vessel GTS Asiafreighter.

== Variants ==
All variants have the same number of compressor and turbine stages.

Comp.	Model	Certification	Takeoff, dry	Length	Width	Weight	LP rpm	HP rpm	T/W	Fan	Application
15-stage	JT9D-3A	Jan 9, 1970	43,500 lbf (193 kN)	154.89 in 3.934 m	95.60 in 2.428 m	8,713 lb (3.952 t)	3650	7850	4.99	92.3 in 2.34 m	Boeing 747
15-stage	JT9D-7	Jun 14, 1971	45,500 lbf (202 kN)	154.89 in 3.934 m	95.60 in 2.428 m	8,880 lb (4.03 t)	3750	8000	5.12	92.3 in 2.34 m	Boeing 747
15-stage	JT9D-7A	Sep 22, 1972	46,150 lbf (205.3 kN)	154.89 in 3.934 m	95.60 in 2.428 m	8,880 lb (4.03 t)	3750	8000	5.2	92.3 in 2.34 m	Boeing 747
15-stage	JT9D-20	Oct 16, 1972	44,500 lbf (198 kN)	154.89 in 3.934 m	96.61 in 2.454 m	8,470 lb (3.84 t)	3650	8000	5.25	92.3 in 2.34 m	McDonnell Douglas DC-10
15-stage	JT9D-7H	Jun 19, 1974	45,500 lbf (202 kN)	154.89 in 3.934 m	95.60 in 2.428 m	8,880 lb (4.03 t)	3650	8000	5.12	92.3 in 2.34 m	Boeing 747
15-stage	JT9D-7AH	Jun 19, 1974	46,150 lbf (205.3 kN)	154.89 in 3.934 m	95.60 in 2.428 m	8,880 lb (4.03 t)	3650	8000	5.2	92.3 in 2.34 m	Boeing 747
15-stage	JT9D-7F	Sep 30, 1974	46,750 lbf (208.0 kN)	154.89 in 3.934 m	95.60 in 2.428 m	8,880 lb (4.03 t)	3750	8000	5.26	92.3 in 2.34 m	Boeing 747
15-stage	JT9D-7FW	Aug 2, 1982	50,000 lbf (220 kN)	154.89 in 3.934 m	95.60 in 2.428 m	8,880 lb (4.03 t)	3750	8000	5.63	92.3 in 2.34 m	Boeing 747
15-stage	JT9D-7J	Aug 31, 1976	48,650 lbf (216.4 kN)	154.89 in 3.934 m	95.60 in 2.428 m	8,880 lb (4.03 t)	3750	8000	5.48	92.3 in 2.34 m	
15-stage	JT9D-20J	Dec 29, 1986	48,050 lbf (213.7 kN)	154.89 in 3.934 m	96.61 in 2.454 m	8,580 lb (3.89 t)	3750	8000	5.6	92.3 in 2.34 m	
16-stage	JT9D-59A	Dec 12, 1974	51,720 lbf (230.1 kN)	154.256 in 3.9181 m	97.03 in 2.465 m	9,140 lb (4.15 t)	3780	8011	5.66	93.6 in 2.38 m	McDonnell Douglas DC-10; Airbus A300
16-stage	JT9D-70A	Dec 12, 1974	51,140 lbf (227.5 kN)	154.256 in 3.9181 m	97.03 in 2.465 m	9,155 lb (4.153 t)	3780	8011	5.59	93.6 in 2.38 m	Boeing 747
16-stage	JT9D-7Q	Oct 31, 1978	51,900 lbf (231 kN)	154.256 in 3.9181 m	97.03 in 2.465 m	9,295 lb (4.216 t)	3888	8000	5.58	93.6 in 2.38 m	Boeing 747
16-stage	JT9D-7Q3	Oct 22, 1979	51,900 lbf (231 kN)	154.256 in 3.9181 m	97.03 in 2.465 m	9,295 lb (4.216 t)	3960	8000	5.58	93.6 in 2.38 m	Boeing 747
16-stage	JT9D-7R4D	Nov 25, 1980	48,000 lbf (210 kN)	154.256 in 3.9181 m	96.00 in 2.438 m	8,935 lb (4.053 t)	3770	8000	5.37	93.4 in 2.37 m	Boeing 767
16-stage	JT9D-7R4D1	Apr 1, 1981	48,000 lbf (210 kN)	154.256 in 3.9181 m	96.00 in 2.438 m	8,915 lb (4.044 t)	3810	8000	5.38	93.4 in 2.37 m	Airbus A310
16-stage	JT9D-7R4E	Apr 1, 1981	50,000 lbf (220 kN)	154.256 in 3.9181 m	96.00 in 2.438 m	8,915 lb (4.044 t)	3770	8000	5.61	93.4 in 2.37 m	Boeing 767
16-stage	JT9D-7R4E1	Apr 1, 1981	50,000 lbf (220 kN)	154.295 in 3.9191 m	96.00 in 2.438 m	8,935 lb (4.053 t)	3810	8000	5.6	93.4 in 2.37 m	Airbus A310
16-stage	JT9D-7R4G2	Jul 23, 1982	54,750 lbf (243.5 kN)	154.295 in 3.9191 m	96.00 in 2.438 m	9,170 lb (4.16 t)	3825	8080	5.97	93.4 in 2.37 m	Boeing 747
16-stage	JT9D-7R4H1	Jul 23, 1982	56,000 lbf (250 kN)	154.295 in 3.9191 m	96.00 in 2.438 m	8,915 lb (4.044 t)	3810	8080	6.28	93.4 in 2.37 m	Airbus A300-600
16-stage	JT9D-7R4E4	Mar 29, 1985	50,000 lbf (220 kN)	154.295 in 3.9191 m	96.00 in 2.438 m	8,935 lb (4.053 t)	3810	8080	5.6	93.4 in 2.37 m	Boeing 767

== Applications ==
- Airbus A300
- Airbus A310
- Boeing 747-100/-100SR/-100B/-200B/-300/SP
- Boeing 767 (early models)
- Boeing RC-1
- McDonnell Douglas DC-10-40

== Specifications (JT9D-7R4) ==
Data from Pratt & Whitney

==== General characteristics ====
- Type: High bypass turbofan
- Length: 132.7 in (3.37 m) (flange to flange)
- Diameter: 93.4 in (2.37 m) (fan tip)
- Dry weight: 8,608 lb (3,905 kg)

==== Components ====
- Compressor: 3-stage low pressure 11-stage high pressure axial
- Turbine: 2-stage high pressure 4-stage low pressure

==== Performance ====
- Maximum thrust: 48,000–56,000 lbf (214–249 kN) takeoff (flat rated at 86 °F (30 °C))
  Note: the thrust range applies to various -7R4 variants for different aircraft.
- Overall pressure ratio: overall 26.7 (fan 1.67:1)
- Bypass ratio: 4.8:1

== See also ==
Related development

- Pratt & Whitney PW2000
- Pratt & Whitney PW4000

Comparable engines

- General Electric CF6
- General Electric TF39
- Progress D-18T
- Rolls-Royce RB211

Related lists

- List of aircraft engines
