= Progress D-18T =

Soviet high-bypass turbofan

D-18T
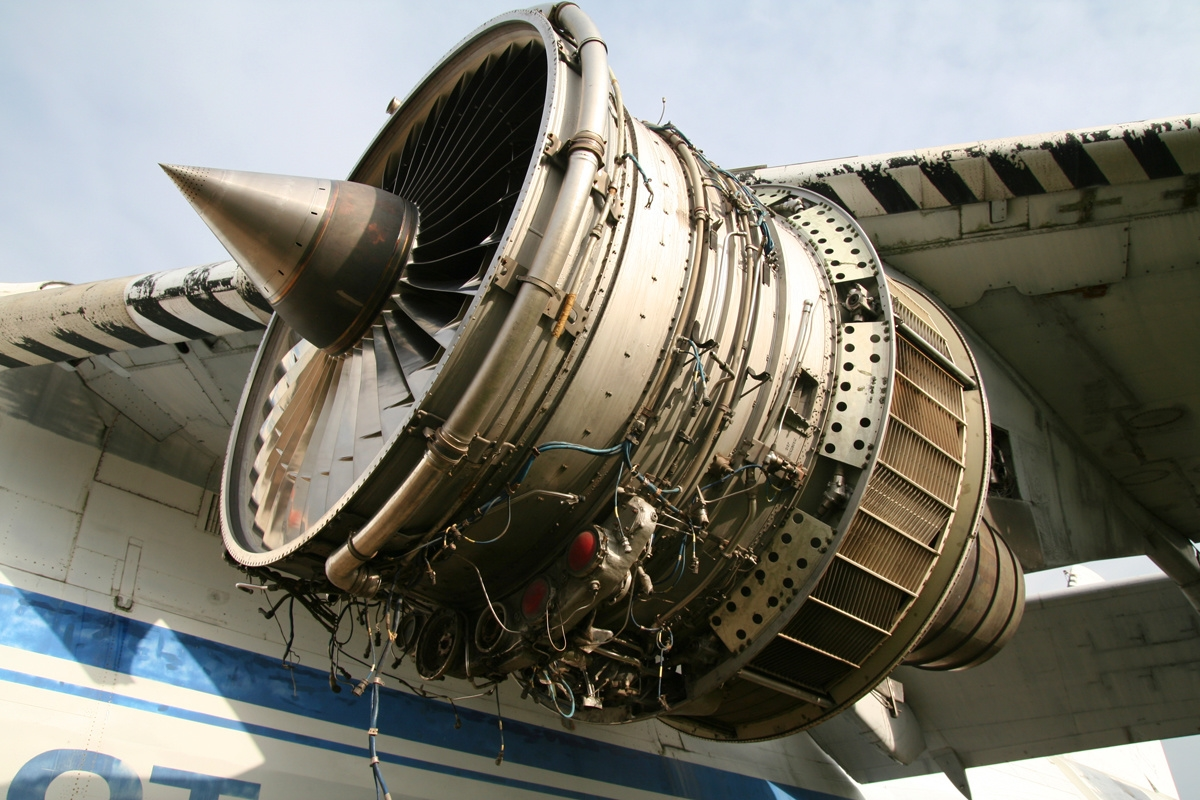
- D-18T engine installed on an Antonov An-124 "Ruslan" prototype
- Type: Turbofan
- National origin: Soviet Union / Ukraine
- Manufacturer: Motor Sich
- Designer: Ivchenko-Progress
- First run: 1980
- Major applications: Antonov An-124 Ruslan; Antonov An-225 Mriya
- Number built: 188

The Progress D-18T (or Lotarev D-18T) is a 51,500 lbf (229 kN) high-bypass turbofan that powers the Antonov An-124 Ruslan and An-225 large freighters.

== Design and development ==
The engine was developed in the second half of the 1970s by the then Soviet Ivchenko-Progress design bureau. It is manufactured by the Motor Sich factory in Zaporizhzhia, Ukraine. It was the first engine in the USSR that could deliver more than 20,000 kgf (~196 kN or ~44,000 lbf) of thrust. The first start of a full-scale engine occurred on September 19, 1980, the An-124 maiden flight on December 24, 1982 and the engine passed official bench tests on December 19, 1985.

An upgraded 3M version was developed to reduce emissions and increase the life of the hot section to 14,000 h, and is introduced on An-124s of Antonov Airlines. Currently 188 D-18T engines are in operation with a total flight time of over 1 million hours.

== Incidents ==
In March 2020 Ukrainian authorities ordered a one time inspection of all D-18T engine intermediate pressure compressor disks following an uncontained engine failure. Inspections were required to be carried out within six months. On 13 November 2020 a Volga-Dnepr Airlines An-124 had an uncontained failure of the inboard left (number 2) D-18T engine.

== Applications ==
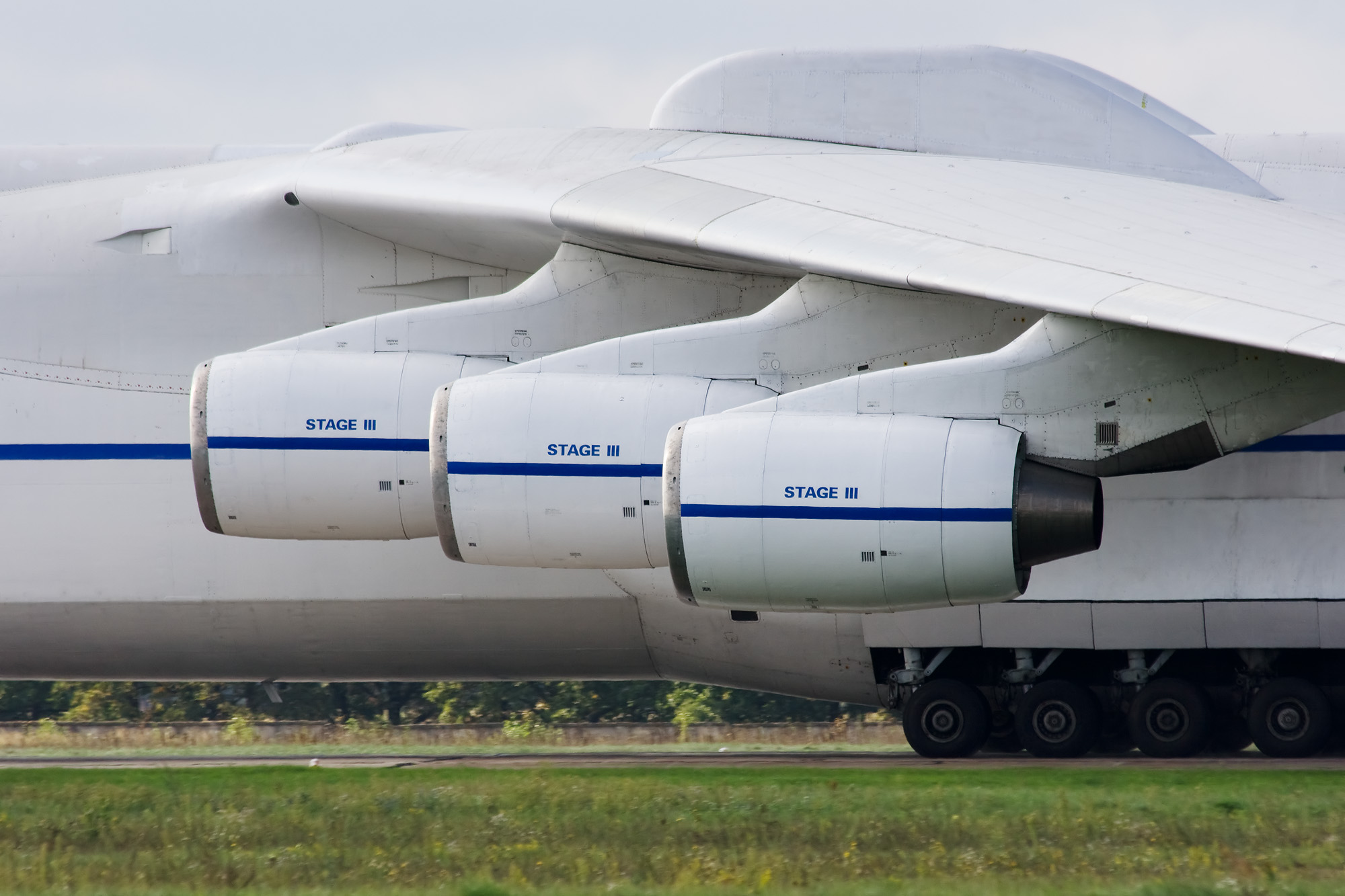
Three of the six D-18T engines on Antonov An-225 Mriya

- Antonov An-124
- Antonov An-225 (destroyed 2022)

== Specifications (D-18T) ==
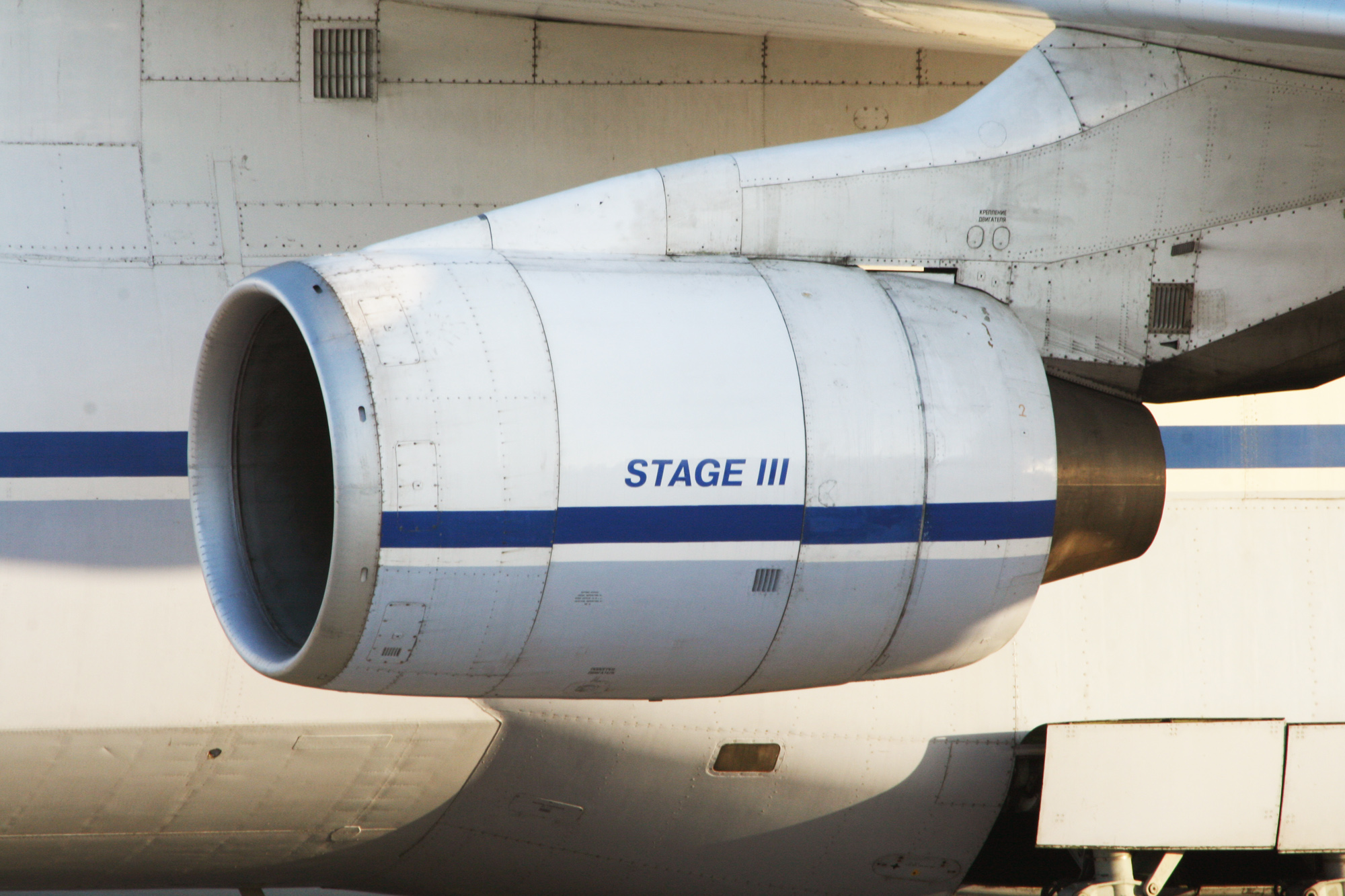
One of the four D-18T engines of an Antonov An-124

Data from forecastinternational.com

==== General characteristics ====
- Type: Three-spool high bypass turbofan engine
- Length: 5.4 m (212.6 in)
- Width: 2.93 m (115.6 in)
- Height: 2.79 m (109.9 in)
- Fan diameter: 2.33 m (91.73 in)
- Diameter:
- Dry weight: 4,100 kg (9,039 lb)

==== Components ====
- Compressor: Single-stage fan, seven-stage IP compressor, seven-stage HP axial compressor
- Combustors: Annular combustion system
- Turbine: Single-stage HP turbine, single-stage IP turbine, four‑stage LP turbine

==== Performance ====
- Maximum thrust: Takeoff: 23,430 kgf (51,700 lbf; 229.8 kN); Cruise: 4,860 kgf (10,700 lbf; 47.7 kN)
- Overall pressure ratio: 27.5
- Bypass ratio: 5.7
- Turbine inlet temperature: 1,600 K (1,327 °C; 2,420 °F)
- Specific fuel consumption: Takeoff: 9.8 g/(kN⋅s) (0.345 lb/(lbf⋅h)); Cruise: 15.5 g/(kN⋅s) (0.546 lb/(lbf⋅h))
- Thrust-to-weight ratio: 5.72

== See also ==
Comparable engines

- General Electric TF39
- General Electric CF6
- General Electric GEnx-2B
- Pratt & Whitney JT9D
- Pratt & Whitney PW4000
- Rolls-Royce RB211-524
- Rolls-Royce Trent 500
- Rolls-Royce Trent 900

Related lists

- List of aircraft engines
