= Pratt & Whitney PW2000 =

Series of high-bypass turbofan aero engines

PW2000/F117
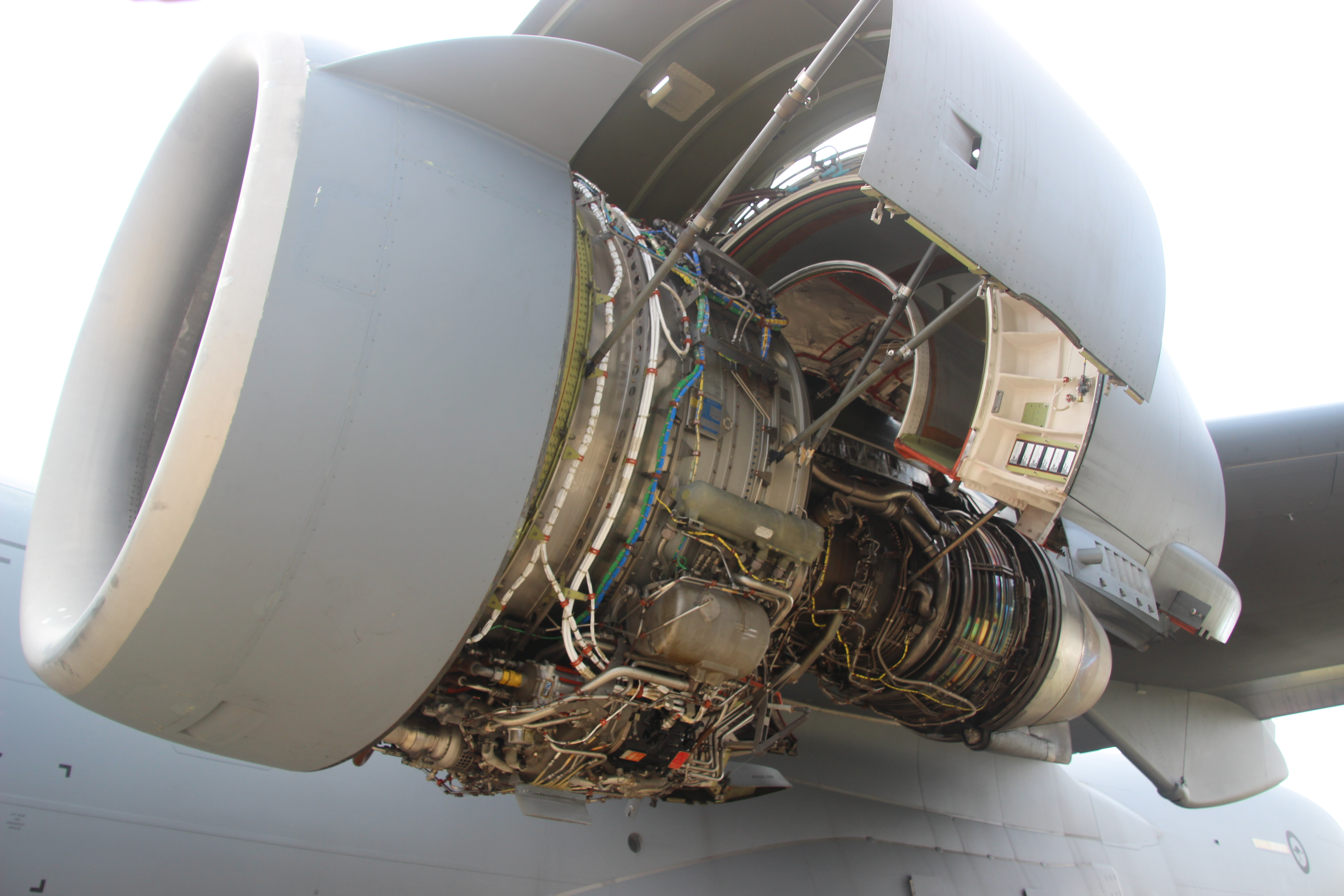
- F117 engine with cowlings opened
- Type: Turbofan
- National origin: United States
- Manufacturer: Pratt & Whitney
- First run: December 1981
- Major applications: Boeing 757; Boeing C-17 Globemaster III; Boeing C-32A; Ilyushin Il-96M
- Developed from: Pratt & Whitney JT9D
- Developed into: Pratt & Whitney PW6000

The Pratt & Whitney PW2000, also known by the military designation F117 and initially referred to as the JT10D, is a series of high-bypass turbofan aircraft engines with a thrust range from 37,000 to 43,000 lbf (160 to 190 kN). Built by Pratt & Whitney, they were designed for the Boeing 757. As a 757 powerplant, these engines compete with the Rolls-Royce RB211.

== Design and development ==
Pratt & Whitney began working on the JT10D in October 1971 intended for the McDonnell Douglas YC-15 into the Advanced Medium STOL Transport project and the Boeing 767, then code named 7X7, which first ran in August 1974. In December 1980, Pratt & Whitney changed to a new naming system for its engines and the JT10D became the PW2037.

The PW2000 is a dual-spool, axial air flow, annular combustion, high bypass turbofan with a dual-channel full authority digital engine control (FADEC) system. It was certified in 1984 as the first civilian FADEC-controlled aviation engine.

MTU Aero Engines holds a 21.2% stake in the engine project, having developed the low-pressure turbine and turbine exit casing as well as producing critical parts of the low-pressure turbine, the turbine exhaust casing, high-pressure compressor and high-pressure turbine components.

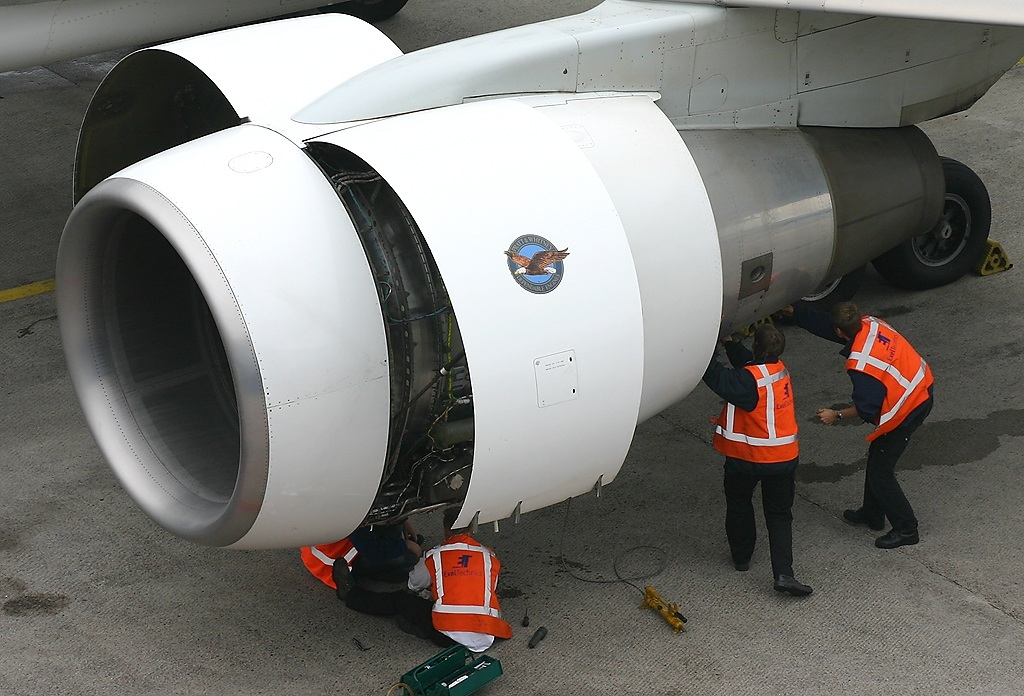
A PW2000 on the 757-200

The first PW2037 equipped Boeing 757 flew on 14 March 1984 and delivery began on 5 November to Delta as the launch customer for the civil aviation version of the engine.

Other than the 757, the PW2000 series engines also power the C-17 Globemaster III military transport; the United States Department of Defense designation for the engine is F117, with the specific variant used on the C-17 being the F117-PW-100. The powerplant first flew on the C-17 in 1991. Still maintaining the F117 engine for the U.S. military, Pratt & Whitney received a $5.5 billion contract modification in June 2023 for engine sustainment in San Francisco, California; Columbus, Georgia; and Tinker Air Force Base, Oklahoma, through September 2027.

The PW2000 also powered the Ilyushin Il-96M; the engine first flew on the Il-96M in 1993.

On October 16, 2008 the NTSB recommended that the FAA issue urgent new inspection procedures on the PW2037 model of the engine, following an uncontained turbine failure event in August 2008. The NTSB recommended that the FAA order PW2037 engines inspected beyond a threshold of flight hours or flight cycles less than that of the event engine, and be reinspected at regular intervals.

The latest build standard, named PW2043, launched in 1994. It provides over 43,000 lbf (190 kN) of thrust. Previous generations of engines can be converted to the PW2043 version.

== Applications ==
- Boeing 757
  - Boeing C-32A
- Boeing C-17 Globemaster III
- Ilyushin Il-96M
- Jetzero Z4 Demonstrator (planned)

== Specifications (PW2000) ==
Cutaway drawing of the PW2000 engine

Data from FAA

==== General characteristics ====
- Type: Turbofan
- Length: 146.8 in (3,729 mm)
- Diameter: 78.5 in (1,994 mm)
- Dry weight: 7,100 lb (3,221 kg)

==== Components ====
- Compressor: Axial, 1 stage fan with 36 blades, 4 stage LP, 12 stage HP
- Combustors: Annular
- Turbine: 2 stage HP, 5 stage LP
- Fuel type: Jet-A, Aviation kerosene

==== Performance ====
- Maximum thrust: 38,400–43,734 lbf (170.81–194.54 kN)
- Overall pressure ratio: 27.6-31.2:1
- Bypass ratio: 6.0:1
- Thrust-to-weight ratio: 5.41-6.16

== See also ==
Related development

- Pratt & Whitney PW6000

Comparable engines

- Aviadvigatel PS-90
- General Electric CF6
- Pratt & Whitney PW4000
- Rolls-Royce RB211

Related lists

- List of aircraft engines
