= Rolls-Royce RB211 =

1960s British turbofan aircraft engine

RB211
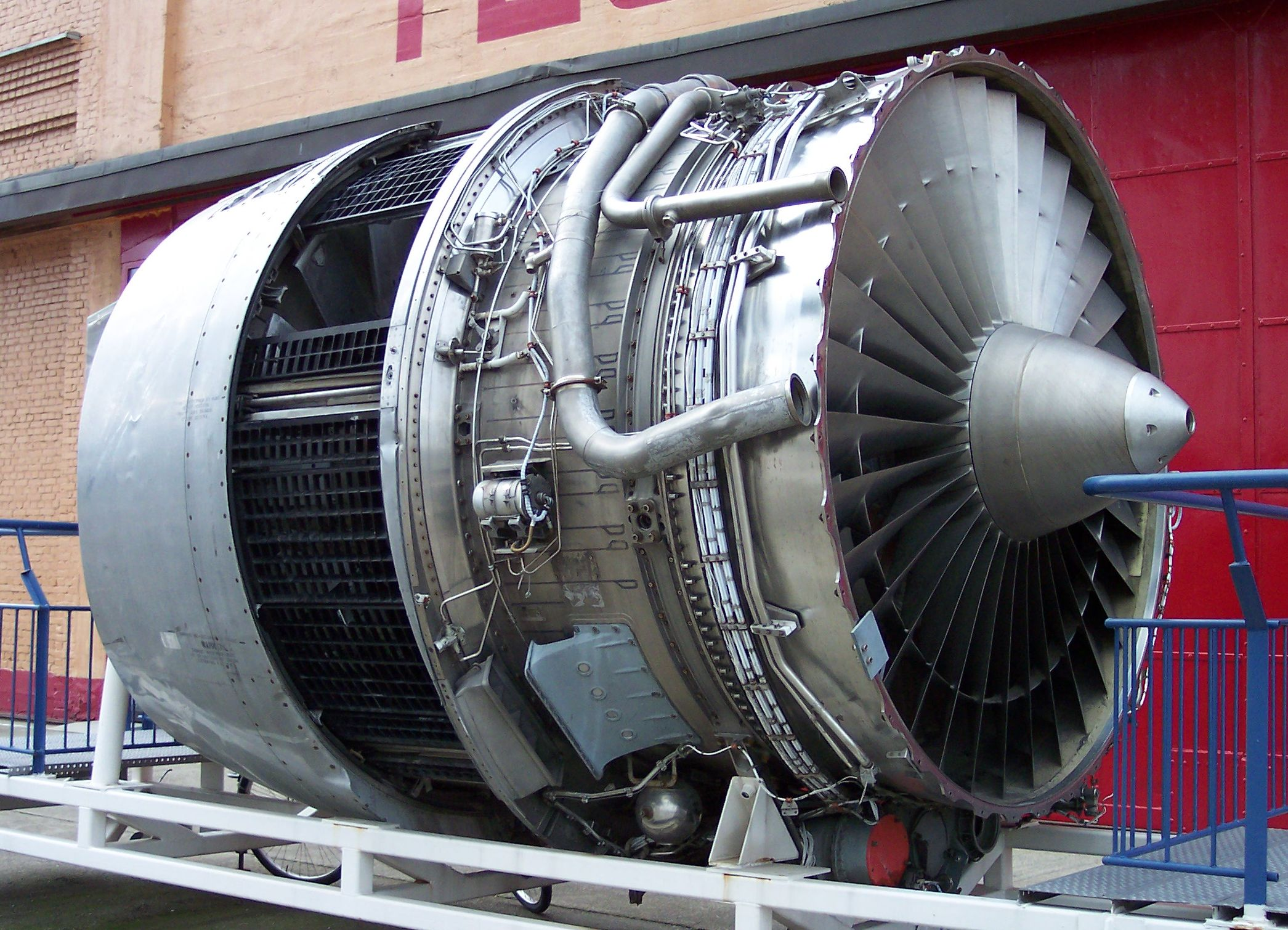
- RB211 at the Technik Museum Speyer with no front cowls
- Type: Turbofan
- National origin: United Kingdom
- Manufacturer: Rolls-Royce
- First run: 1969
- Major applications: Boeing 747; Boeing 757; Boeing 767; Lockheed L-1011 TriStar; Tupolev Tu-204
- Manufactured: 1969–2000s
- Developed from: Rolls-Royce Spey
- Developed into: Rolls-Royce Trent

The Rolls-Royce RB211 is a British family of high-bypass turbofan engines made by Rolls-Royce. The engines are capable of generating 41,030 to 59,450 lbf (182.5 to 264.4 kN) of thrust. The RB211 engine was the first production three-spool engine.

Originally developed for the Lockheed L-1011 TriStar, it entered service in 1972 and was the exclusive engine to power the L-1011. Mismanagement of the initial development and consequent cost issues led to the company assets being transferred to a new government-owned company, Rolls-Royce (1971) Ltd., to save the workforce and the engine businesses important to the UK and many other aerospace and aircraft operating companies.

In the early 1970s, the engine was reckoned by the company to be capable of at least 50 years of continuous development. The RB.211 was renamed, in 1989, to become the basis of the Rolls-Royce Trent family of engines when the RB211-524L was renamed to the Trent.

== History ==
=== Background ===
In 1966, American Airlines announced a requirement for a new short-medium range airliner with a focus on low-cost per-seat operations. While it was looking for a twin-engined plane, aircraft manufacturers needed more than one customer to justify developing a new airliner. Eastern Airlines had expressed interest, but required greater range and needed to operate long routes over water. At the time, this demanded three engines to provide redundancy. Other airlines also favored three engines. Lockheed and Douglas responded with designs, the L-1011 TriStar and DC-10 respectively. Both had three engines, transcontinental range and seated around 300 passengers in a widebody layout with two aisles.

The wide-body McDonnell-Douglas DC-10 was representative of the innovative aircraft and aero-engine technologies which were then being adopted by US and European airframe manufacturers to provide airlines with aircraft of very large carrying capacity and short/medium to long range. These very large capacity aircraft were needed to address the significant increases in passenger numbers and air traffic which were then being forecast by the industry. In Europe, large capacity airliner concept studies had been carried out by both private and government organisations since the late 1950s and early 1960s. Many of the studies conducted by the aviation companies were weighted towards a 200 to 300 seat aircraft, with a high cycle performance that was based on the usage of the game-changing new technology of the high by-pass ratio aero-engine.

Between 1964 and 1967, Hawker Siddeley's examination of British European Airways (BEA)'s requirements produced the 160-seat HS.132 and the 185-seat HS.134; both offered the prospect of a 25–30% reduction in seat mile costs over aircraft then in service. Both of the designs would have used two new-technology Rolls-Royce RB.178 aero-engines of 30,000 lbf (130 kN) to provide superior operating performance over the first generation three-engine jets.

According to Cownie, Gunston, Hayward and the UK Department of Trade & Industry (DTI), the roots of the advanced RB.178 go back to 1961 when Rolls-Royce officially initiated work on a high by-pass ratio aero-engine as a replacement for the Conway. The company went ahead with the project and under the leadership of Adrian Lombard built the twin-spool demonstrator. Overall development costs of the RB.178 was £2.6 million. As a comparison, the GE and P&W companies were awarded nearly $20 million by the US Department of Defense to develop and build the TF39 and STF200 technology demonstrators.

The RB.178 was built on the reliable and economic advantages inherent in the Conway and, given that engine's heritage, the new engine's performance looked certain. The RB.178 (designated the 16 series) appears to have been the engine proposed for the Vickers Superb DB.265 (VC10), with four engines powering the high capacity transatlantic airliner.

There are perhaps many reasons why the RB.178 failed. Chief among them was Boeing declining to offer the Rolls-Royce engine on the 747.

The RB.178 was cancelled in May 1966 and in June 1966 Rolls-Royce indicated it did not want to battle with P&W over the Boeing 747. In September 1966 Rolls-Royce revealed its decision to launch an Advanced Technology Engine (ATE) family covering thrusts ranging from the 10,000 lbf (44 kN) RB.203 through the 60,000 lbf (270 kN) RB.207. The ATE family introduced new technologies such as the triple-shaft architecture, an annular combustor and a structurally integrated power-plant (nacelle).

Both planes also required new engines. Engines were undergoing a period of rapid advance due to the introduction of the high bypass concept, which provided for greater thrust, improved fuel economy and less noise than the earlier low-bypass designs. Rolls-Royce had been working on an engine of the required 45,000 lbf (200 kN) thrust class for an abortive attempt to introduce an updated Hawker Siddeley Trident as the RB178. This work was later developed for the 47,500 lbf (211 kN) thrust RB207 to be used on the Airbus A300, before, with the withdrawal of the UK from the Airbus programme, it was cancelled in favour of the RB211 programme.

Rolls-Royce was also working on a series of triple-spool (Note: Sometimes called "three-spool".) designs as replacements for the Conway, which promised to deliver higher efficiency. In this configuration, three groups of turbines spin three separate concentric shafts to power three sections of the compressor area running at different speeds. In addition to allowing each stage of the compressor to run at its optimal speed, the triple-spool design is more compact and rigid, although more complex to build and maintain. Several designs were being worked on at the time, including a 10,000 lbf (44 kN) thrust design known as the RB203 intended to replace the Spey. Work started on the Conway replacement engine in July 1961 and a twin-spool demonstrator engine to prove the HP compressor, combustor, and turbine system designs, had been run by 1966. Rolls-Royce chose the triple-spool system in 1965 as the simplest, lowest cost solution to the problem of obtaining lower fuel consumption and reduced noise levels at a constant power setting. Work on the RB211 as essentially a scaled-down RB207 began in 1966-7 with the first certificated engines being scheduled to be available by December 1970 at 33,260 lbf (147.9 kN) take-off thrust and at a price of $511,000 each.

In February 1968, American Airlines had chosen the Rolls-Royce RB211 to power its order for up to 50 McDonnell-Douglas DC-10s. On 7 March 1968, the Washington correspondent of The Times wrote of an attempt being made by Congress to block Rolls-Royce's bid to supply engines for the projected United States airbus. Representative Robert Taft Jr. of Ohio had marshalled opposition because of a report that Rolls-Royce had won approval for the engine. On 9 March 1968, The Times reported that President Lyndon Johnson had received written protests from six senators and five representatives, from Ohio and New Mexico – states that would benefit if a US manufacturer was selected. Their complaint was that 'not adequately balanced information was given during talks between representatives of airlines and the British Government concerning the American Government's position on buying foreign engines'. The US Congress was concerned that the import of foreign engines would result in a US payments deficit of $3,800 million and the loss of 18,000 to 20,000 jobs.

=== Finalisation of design ===
On 23 June 1967, Rolls-Royce offered Lockheed the RB211-06 for the L-1011. The new engine was to be rated at 33,260 lbf (147,900 N) thrust and combined features of several engines then under development: the large high-power, high-bypass design from the RB207 and the triple-spool design of the RB203. To this was added one new piece of technology, a fan stage built of a new carbon fibre material called Hyfil developed at the RAE Farnborough. The weight saving was considerable over a similar fan made of titanium, and gave the RB211 an advantage over its competitors in terms of power-to-weight ratio. Despite knowing that the timetable was challenging for an engine incorporating these new features, Rolls-Royce committed to putting the RB211 into service in 1971.

Lockheed felt that the new engine enabled the L-1011 to offer a distinct advantage over the otherwise similar DC-10 product. However, Douglas had also requested proposals from Rolls-Royce for an engine to power its DC-10, and in October 1967 the response was a 35,400 lbf (157,000 N) thrust version of the RB211 designated RB211-10. There followed a period of intense negotiation between airframe manufacturers Lockheed and Douglas, engine suppliers Rolls-Royce, General Electric and Pratt & Whitney, and the major US airlines. During this time prices were negotiated downwards and the required thrust ratings were increased. By early 1968, Rolls-Royce was offering a 40,600 lbf (181,000 N) thrust engine designated RB211-18. On 29 March 1968 Lockheed announced that it had received orders for 94 TriStars, and placed an order with Rolls-Royce for 150 sets of engines designated RB211-22. (Note: Douglas and its DC-10 launch customers American Airlines and United Airlines selected the General Electric CF6 engine for the DC-10. The Pratt & Whitney JT9D was fitted to later variants.)

=== RB211-22 series ===
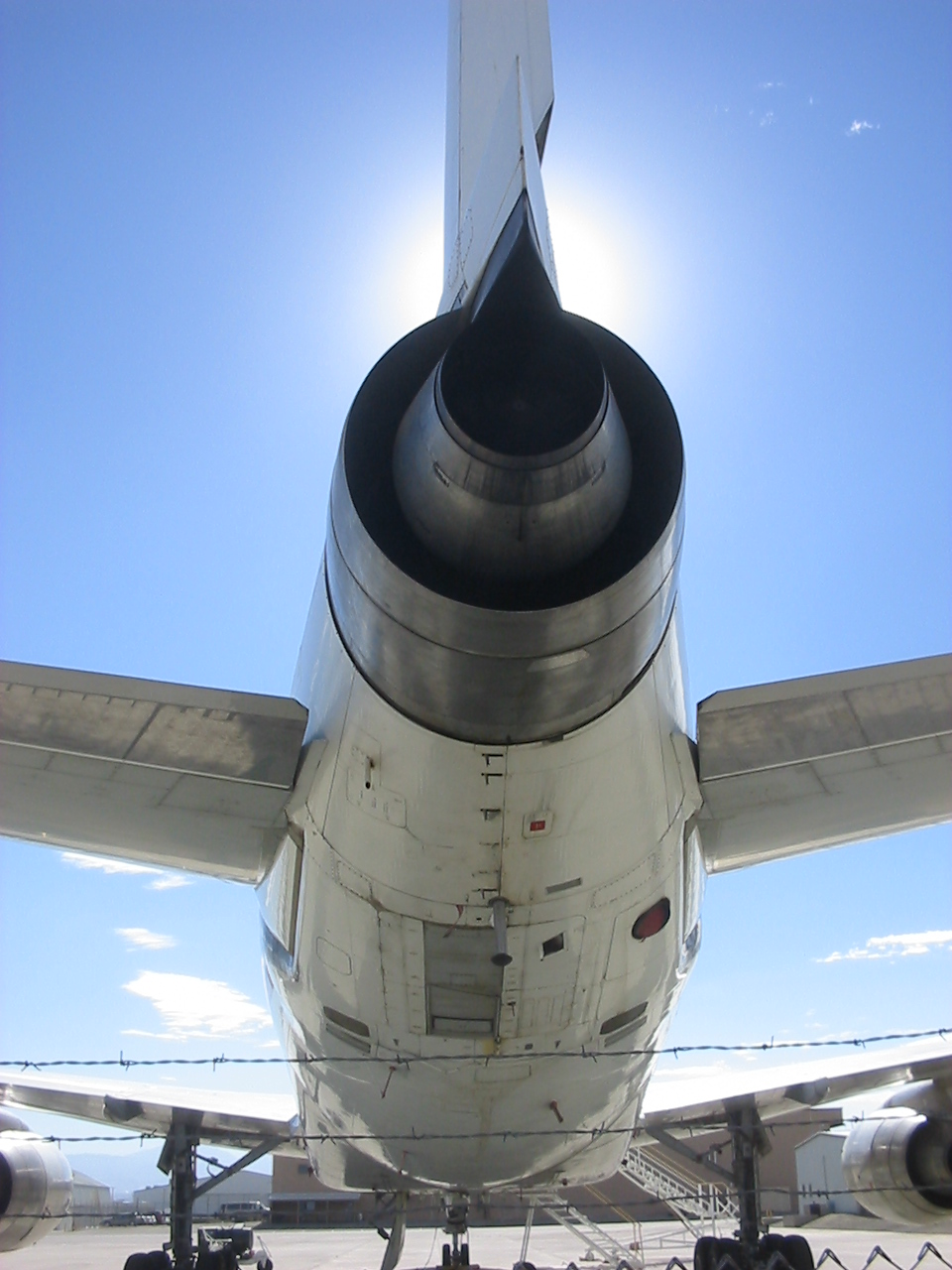
Lockheed L-1011 TriStar rear nozzle

==== Development and testing ====
The RB211's complexity required a lengthy development and testing period. By Autumn 1969 Rolls-Royce was struggling to meet the performance guarantees to which it had committed: the engine had insufficient thrust, was over weight and its fuel consumption was excessive. The situation deteriorated further when in May 1970 the new Hyfil (a carbon fibre composite) fan stage, after passing other tests, shattered when a chicken carcass was fired into it at high speed as part of the bird ingestion test. (Note: Bird ingestion testing was, and still is, a FAA requirement for aircraft engines.) The company had been developing a titanium blade as an insurance against difficulties with Hyfil, but this meant extra cost and more weight. It also brought its own technical problems when it was discovered that only one side of the titanium billet was of the right metallurgical quality for blade fabrication.

In addition, the project suffered a setback with the death of Chief Engineer Adrian "Lom" Lombard in July 1967, a loss that was described as Rolls-Royce having been "deprived of one of the finest trouble-shooting engineers in the industry".

"It was all too obvious that the Derby engineers, normally proud and self-confident to the point of arrogance, had slid from bad to worse when their great leader, Lombard, had been so suddenly plucked from them in 1967. His death had left a vacuum which nobody could fill ... " – Stanley Hooker

In September 1970, Rolls-Royce reported to the government that development costs for the RB211 had risen to £170.3 million – nearly double the original estimate. The estimated production costs now exceeded the £230,375 selling price of each engine. The project was in crisis.

==== Insolvency and aftermath ====
By January 1971 Rolls-Royce had become insolvent, and on 4 February 1971 was placed into receivership, (Note: Rolls-Royce is commonly said to have become bankrupt in 1971. Strictly speaking only individuals and partnerships can go into bankruptcy in the UK.) seriously jeopardising the L-1011 TriStar programme. Because of its strategic importance, the company was nationalised by the Conservative government of Edward Heath, allowing development of the RB211 to be completed.

As Lockheed was itself in a vulnerable position, the British government required that the US government guarantee the bank loans that Lockheed needed to complete the L-1011 project. If Lockheed (which was itself weakened by the difficulties) had failed, the market for the RB211 would have evaporated. Despite some opposition, the US government provided these guarantees. In May 1971, a new company called "Rolls-Royce (1971) Ltd." acquired the assets of Rolls-Royce from the Receiver, and shortly afterwards signed a new contract with Lockheed. This revised agreement cancelled penalties for late delivery, and increased the price of each engine by £110,000.

Hugh Conway (managing director RR Gas Turbines), persuaded Stanley Hooker to come out of retirement and return to Rolls-Royce. As technical director he led a team of other retirees - including Cyril Lovesey and Arthur Rubbra - to fix the remaining problems on the RB211-22. The engine was finally certified on 14 April 1972, about a year later than originally planned, and the first TriStar entered service with Eastern Air Lines on 26 April 1972. Hooker was knighted for his role in 1974.

Speaking of a famous banker in relation to the RB211:

"We (Rolls-Royce) added a zero to his stature; he used to think £5 million a lot of money, but after a few weeks on the RB211 he came to understand that £50 million is peanuts." – Stanley Hooker.

The RB211's initial reliability in service was not as good as had been expected because of the focus of the development programme on meeting the engine's performance guarantees. Early deliveries were of the RB211-22C model, derated slightly from the later -22B. A programme of modifications during the first few years in service improved matters considerably, and the series has since matured into a highly reliable engine.

=== RB211-524 series ===
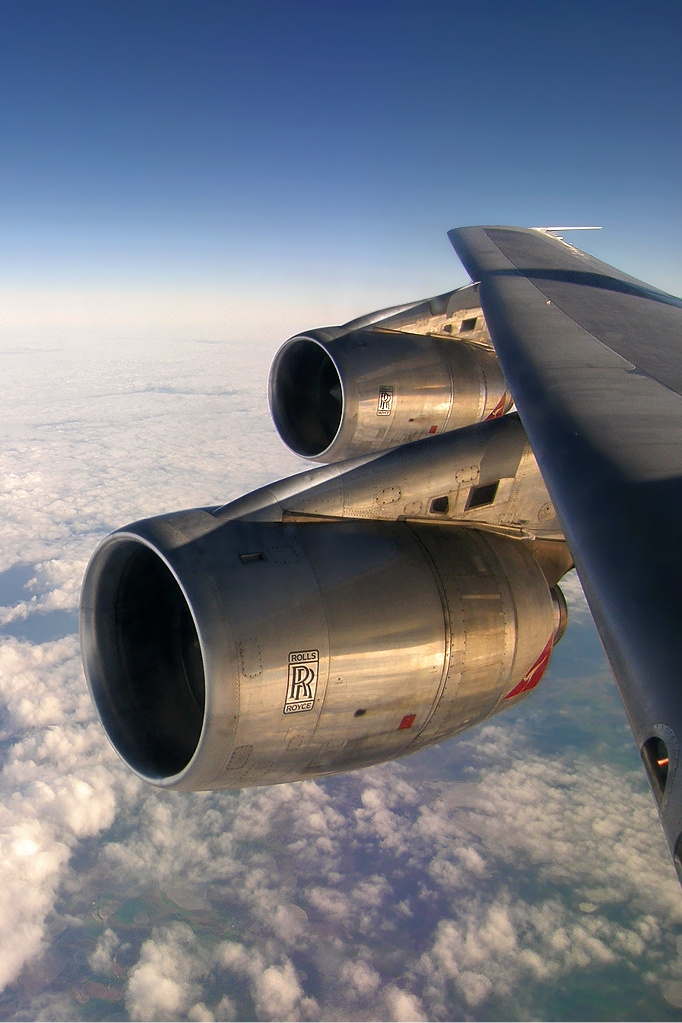
RB211-524 on a Qantas Boeing 747-300

Although originally designed for the L-1011-1, Rolls-Royce knew that the RB211 could be developed to provide greater thrust. By redesigning the fan and the IP compressor, Hooker's team increased the engine's thrust to 50,000 lbf (220 kN). The new version, which first ran on 1 October 1973, was designated RB211-524, and would be able to power new variants of the L-1011, as well as the Boeing 747.

Rolls-Royce tried unsuccessfully to sell the RB211 to Boeing in the 1960s, but the new -524 offered significant performance and efficiency improvements over the Pratt & Whitney JT9D which Boeing had originally selected to power the 747. In October 1973 Boeing agreed to offer the RB211-524 on the 747-200, and British Airways became the first airline to order this combination which entered service in 1977. Flight International stated in 1980:

"The importance placed on fuel saving by airlines is emphasised by Qantas' adoption of RB.211-524 power for its new Boeing 747s – the only aircraft on which all big three fans are available. Qantas found that British Airways' Boeing 747s fitted with RB211s burnt roughly 7% less fuel than its JT9D-equipped fleet, a saving of about $1 million a year per aircraft, at today's prices."

Rolls-Royce continued to develop the -524, increasing its thrust through 51,500 lbf (229 kN) with the -524C, then 53,000 lbf (240 kN) in the -524D which was certificated in 1981. Notable airline customers included Qantas, Cathay Pacific, Air New Zealand, Cargolux and South African Airways. When Boeing launched the heavier 747-400 more thrust was required, and Rolls responded with the -524G rated at 58,000 lbf (260 kN) thrust and then the -524H with 60,600 lbf (270 kN), both introducing a full cowl nacelle with deep-chute forced mixer as already present on the -535E4. These were the first versions to feature FADEC. This was later adopted by GE and Pratt & Whitney for their engines. The -524H was also offered as a third engine choice on the Boeing 767, and the first of these entered service with British Airways in February 1990.

These would have been the final developments of the -524, but when Rolls developed the successor Trent engine, it was found it could fit the Trent 700's improved HP system to the -524G and -524H. These variants were lighter and offered improved fuel efficiency and reduced emissions; they were designated -524G-T and -524H-T respectively. It was also possible to upgrade existing -524G/H engines to the improved -T configuration, and a number of airlines did this.

The -524 became increasingly reliable as it was developed, and the -524H achieved 180-minute ETOPS approval on the 767 in 1993. An RB211 may have a thrust specific fuel consumption around 0.6 lbm/(lbf·h).

The -524L, begun in 1987 to allow further growth in the A330 and 777 market, was more extensively redesigned, the considerable differences incorporated leading to the engine eventually receiving the name Trent, under which name development has continued.

=== RB211-535 series ===
==== RB211-535C ====
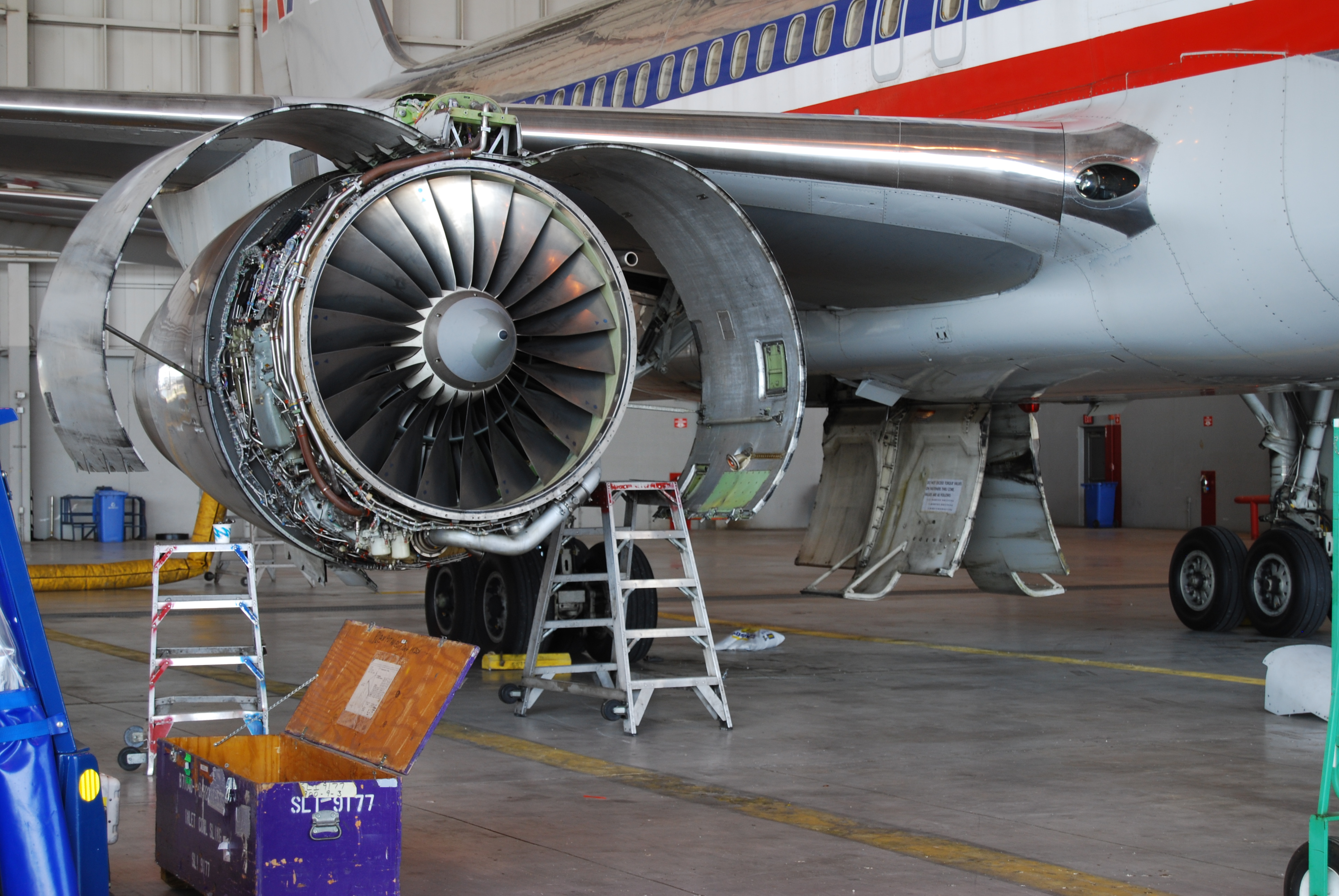
Maintenance of a RB211-535 on an American Airlines Boeing 757

In the mid 1970s, Boeing was considering designs for a new twin-engined aircraft to replace its successful 727. As the size of the proposed plane grew from 150 passengers towards 200, Rolls-Royce realised that the RB211 could be adapted by reducing the diameter of the fan and removing the first IP compressor stage to produce an engine with the necessary 37,400 lbf (166,000 N) thrust. The new version was designated RB211-535. On 31 August 1978 Eastern Airlines and British Airways announced orders for the new 757, powered by the -535. Designated RB211-535C, the engine entered service in January 1983. This was the first time that Rolls-Royce had provided a launch engine on a Boeing aircraft. Eastern Airlines president Frank Borman called the -535C "The finest airline engine in the world".

==== RB211-535E, RB211-535E4 ====
In 1979 Pratt & Whitney launched its PW2000 engine, claiming 8% better fuel efficiency than the -535C for the PW2037 version. Boeing put Rolls-Royce under pressure to supply a more competitive engine for the 757, and using the more advanced -524 core as a basis, the company produced the 40,100 lbf (178,000 N) thrust RB211-535E4 which entered service in October 1984. While not as efficient as the PW2037, it was more reliable and quieter. Visible differences include a long cowl with no jet nozzle protruding beyond the bypass duct. Partial mixing of hot and cold airflows takes place in the integrated or common nozzle. It was also the first to use a wide chord fan blade which increases efficiency, reduces noise and gives added protection against foreign object damage.

Probably the most important single -535E order came in May 1988 when American Airlines ordered 50 757s powered by the -535E4 citing the engine's low noise as an important factor: this was the first time since the TriStar that Rolls-Royce had received a significant order from a US airline, and it led to the -535E4's subsequent market domination on the 757. Unusually, at the time of the announcement made by American, selection of the -535E4 was made public prior to the selection of the 757, though this was welcome news to both Rolls-Royce and Boeing.

After being certified for the 757, the E4 was offered on the Russian Tupolev Tu-204-120 airliner, entering service in 1992. This was the first time a Russian airliner had been supplied with western engines. The -535E4 was also proposed by Boeing for re-engining the B-52H Stratofortress, replacing the aircraft's eight TF33s with four of the turbofans. Further upgrading of the -535E4 took place in the late 1990s to reduce emissions, borrowing technology developed for the Trent 700.

The -535E4 is considered by many to be an extremely reliable engine, and achieved 180-minute ETOPS approval on the 757 in 1990.

=== Industrial RB211 ===
When Rolls-Royce was developing the -22, it realised that it would be straightforward to develop a version of the engine for land-based power generation, and in 1974 the industrial RB211 was launched. When the -524 arrived shortly afterwards, its improvements were incorporated in the industrial RB211 which was designated RB211-24. The generator was gradually developed over the following years and is still marketed today as a range of generators producing 25.2–32 MW. Many of its installations have been in the offshore oil and gas production industries.

=== Marine WR-21 ===
An advanced 25 MW class WR-21 Intercooled Recuperated (ICR) gas turbine was derived for marine propulsion.

== Variants ==
- -22
- -22B
- -22C
- -24
- -52
- -56
- -61
- -524
- -524B
- -524C
- -524D
- -524G
- -524G-T
- -524H
- -524H-T
- -535C
- -535E
- -535E4
- -535E4B
- WR-21

== Engines on display ==
- An RB211-22B is on display at the Rolls-Royce Heritage Trust Collection, Derby.
- An RB211-535C is displayed at the South Yorkshire Aircraft Museum, Doncaster.

== Specifications ==
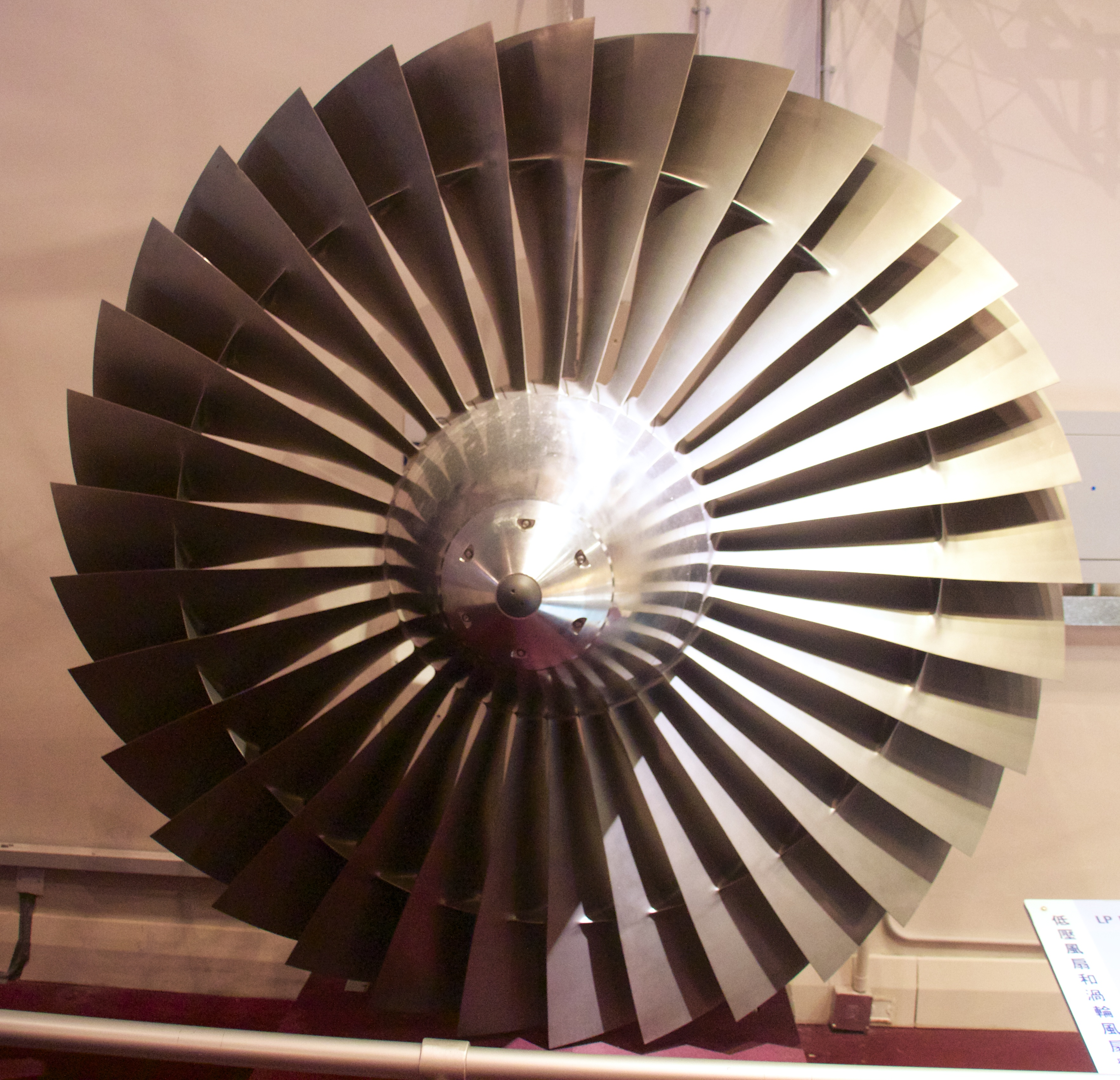
An RB211 fan at Hong Kong Science Museum

Series	-22	-524B/C/D	-524G/H	-535
Type	Triple-spool high bypass turbofan			
Length	204.33 in (5.190 m)	179–189.8 in (4.55–4.82 m)	187.35 in (4.759 m)	198.2 in (5.03 m)
Diameter	86.3 in (2.19 m) Fan			74.1 in (1.88 m) Fan
Dry weight	11,929 lb 5,411 kg	11,000–11,199 lb 4,990–5,080 kg	12,540–12,764 lb 5,688–5,790 kg	8,169 lb 3,705 kg
Compressor	1 Fan, 7 IP stages, 6 HP stages			1 Fan, 6 IP, 6 HP
Combustor	Annular			
Turbine	1 HP stage, 1 IP stage, 3 LP stage			
Max. net thrust	41,030–42,670 lbf 182.5–189.8 kN	49,120–52,810 lbf 218.5–234.9 kN	56,870–59,450 lbf 253.0–264.4 kN	42,540 lbf 189.2 kN
OPR	24.7:1	28–29.5:1	32.8–32.9:1	25:1
Bypass ratio	5:1	5:1	4.3:1	4.4:1
Max. cont. thrust TSFC (sea level)	0.382 lb/lbf/h 10.8 g/kN/s	0.371–0.382 lb/lbf/h 10.5–10.8 g/kN/s	0.3651–0.3889 lb/lbf/h 10.34–11.02 g/kN/s	0.381 lb/lbf/h 10.8 g/kN/s
Thrust/weight	3.44–3.58	4.39–4.8	4.46–4.74	5.21
100% RPM	HP 10,611, IP 7,000, LP 3,900			HP 10,611, IP 7,000, LP 4,500
EIS	1972	1977–1981	1989–1998	1983–1989
Applications	Lockheed L-1011-1/100	Boeing 747-100/200/SP/300; Lockheed L-1011-200/250/500	Boeing 747-400; Boeing 767-300(ER)	Boeing 757-200/300; Tupolev Tu-204

The -535E4 was the first engine to incorporate a hollow wide-chord unsnubbered (Note: A snubber (or clapper) is a damper used to prevent blade flutter on narrow-chord fan blades, at the cost of reduced efficiency. Hollow wide-chord blades are more stable and do not need snubbers.) fan to improve efficiency. It used advanced materials, including titanium in the HP compressor and carbon composites in the nacelle. Later engines incorporate some features (e.g. FADEC) from improved models of the -524.

== See also ==
Related development

- Rolls-Royce Trent
- Rolls-Royce WR-21

Comparable engines

- Aviadvigatel PS-90
- General Electric CF6
- Pratt & Whitney JT9D
- Pratt & Whitney PW2000
- Pratt & Whitney PW4000
- Progress D-18T

Related lists

- List of aircraft engines
