= General Electric CF6 =

Turbofan aircraft engine family

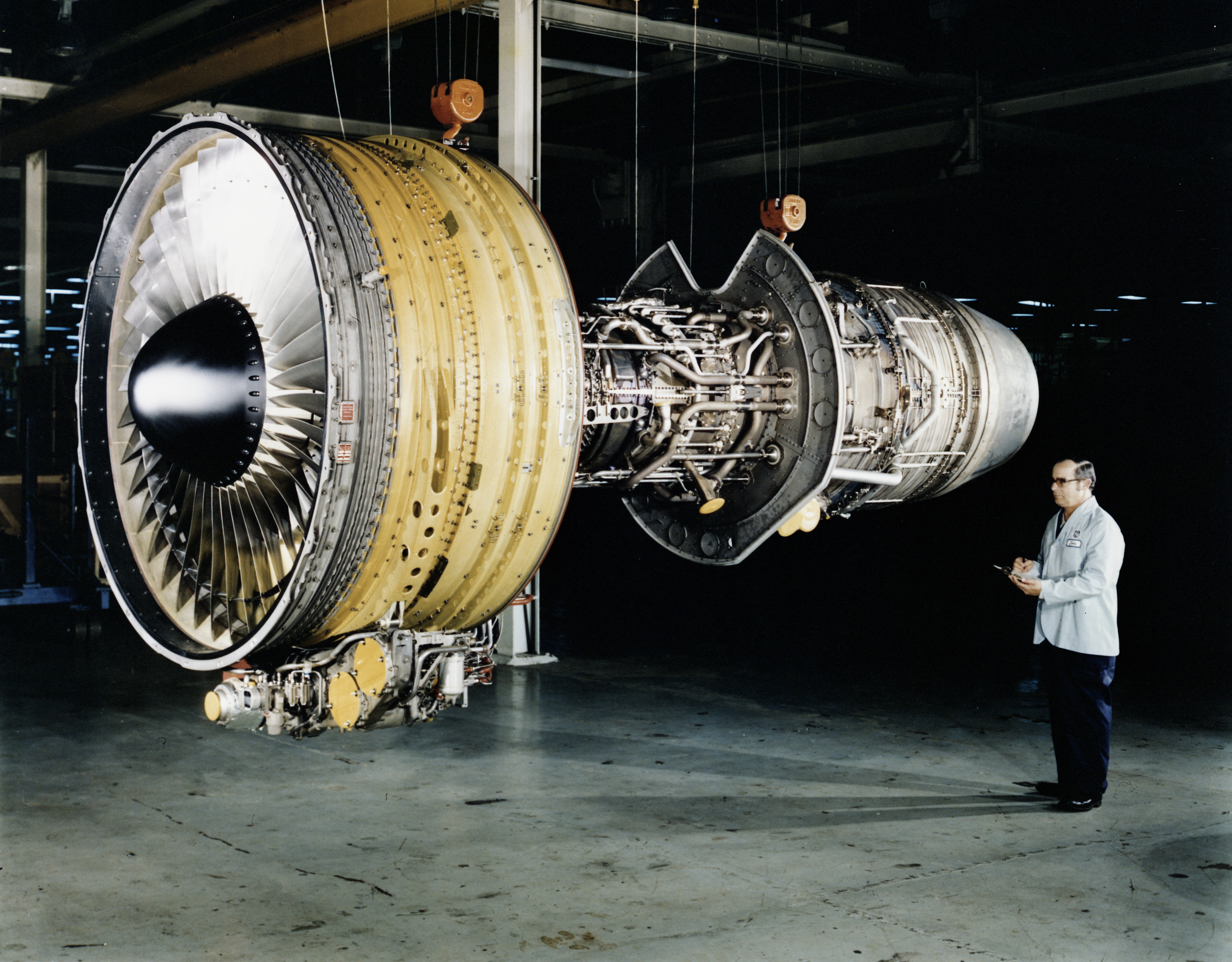
- General Electric CF6 during testing at NASA's Glenn Research Center in 1979

General information
- Type: Turbofan
- National origin: United States
- Manufacturer: GE Aviation
- Major applications: Airbus A300; Airbus A310; Airbus A330; Boeing 747; Boeing 767; Kawasaki C-2; Lockheed C-5M Super Galaxy; McDonnell Douglas DC-10; McDonnell Douglas MD-11
- Number built: 8,300 (2018)

History
- First run: 1971
- Developed from: General Electric TF39
- Developed into: General Electric LM2500; General Electric LM6000

The General Electric CF6, US military designations F103 and F138, is a family of high-bypass turbofan engines produced by GE Aviation. The CF6, based on the TF39, the first high-thrust, high-bypass jet engine, has been used in a wide variety of airliners, but has been superseded by the GEnx in newer airliners.

The CF6 core has been used for the LM2500, LM5000, and LM6000 industrial and marine gas turbines.

== Overview ==
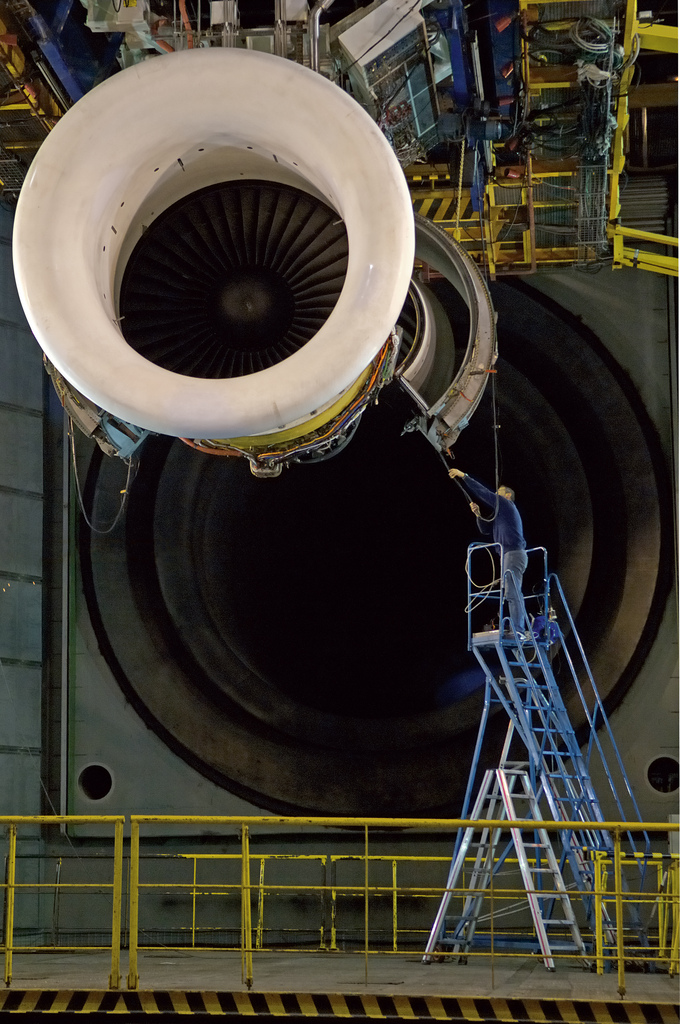
A CF6 turbofan installed at the Spanish National Institute for Aerospace Technology

After developing the TF39 for the C-5 Galaxy in the late 1960s, GE offered a higher thrust variant for civilian use, the CF6. GE proposed the CF6 to Eastern Airlines, for the Lockheed L-1011 and the McDonnell Douglas DC-10. Lockheed used the Rolls-Royce RB211 as its exclusive engine, but the CF6 was chosen for the DC-10, and entered service in 1971. It was also selected for versions of the Boeing 747, and then for the Airbus A300, A310 and A330, Boeing 767, Lockheed C-5M Galaxy, and McDonnell Douglas MD-11.

By 2018, GE had delivered more than 8,300 CF6s: 480 -6s, 2,200 -50s, 4,400 -80C2s, more than 730 -80E; and 3,000 LM6000 industrial and marine derivatives. The in-service fleet included 3,400 engines, generating over 600 shop visits per year.

== Variants ==
=== CF6-6 ===
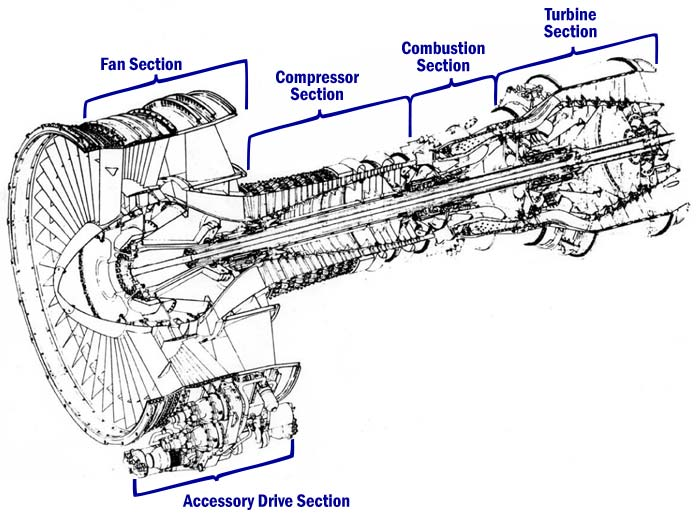
CF6-6 diagram

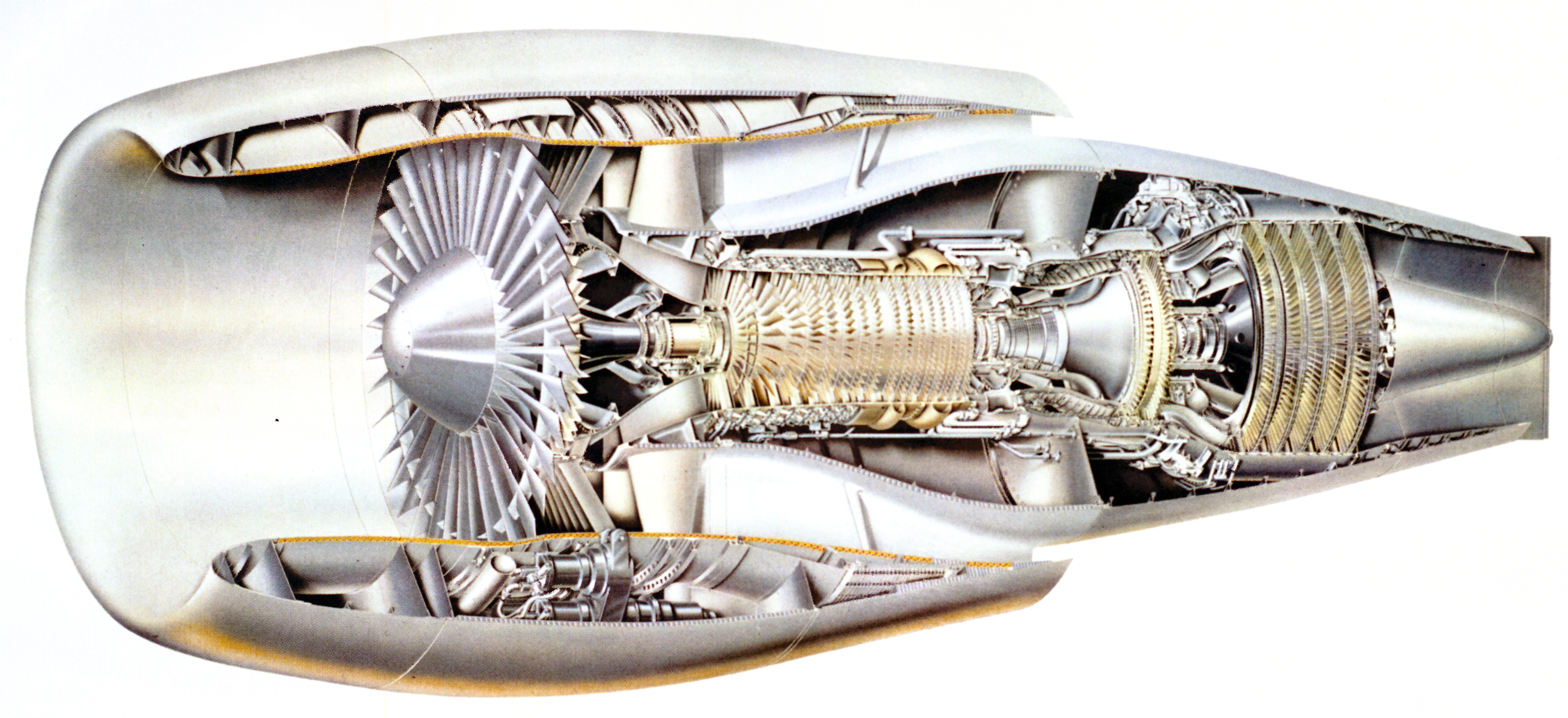
CF6-6 cutaway

The CF6-6 was first used on the McDonnell Douglas DC-10-10.

It has a single-stage fan with one core booster stage driven by a 5-stage LP (low pressure) turbine, and a 16-stage HP (high pressure) axial compressor driven by a 2-stage HP turbine; the combustor is annular; separate exhaust nozzles are used for the fan and core airflows. The 86.4 in (2,190 mm) diameter fan generates an airflow of 1,300 lb/s (590 kg/s), resulting in a bypass ratio of 5.72. The overall pressure ratio is 24.3. The engine develops a maximum static take-off thrust of 41,500 lbf (185 kN).

==== Undeveloped variants ====
The CF6-32 was to be a lower-thrust derivative of the CF6-6 for the Boeing 757. In 1981, GE stopped work on this engine, leaving the 757 to be powered by either Pratt & Whitney or Rolls-Royce powerplants.

=== CF6-50 ===
The CF6-50 series are rated between 51,000 lbf (230 kN) and 54,000 lbf (240 kN) of thrust. It was launched in 1969 to power the long range McDonnell Douglas DC-10-30, derived from the earlier CF6-6.

Not long after the -6 entered service, an increase in thrust was required, obtained by increasing the airflow through the core. Two booster stages were added to the LP (low pressure) compressor and the last two stages of the HP compressor were removed which increased the overall pressure ratio to 29.3. Although the 86.4 in (2.19 m) diameter fan was retained, the airflow was raised to 1,450 lb/s (660 kg/s), giving a static thrust of 51,000 lbf (230 kN). The increase in core flow decreased the bypass ratio to 4.26.

In late 1969, the CF6-50 was selected to power the then new Airbus A300. Air France became the launch customer for the A300 by ordering six aircraft in 1971. In 1975, KLM became the first airline to order the Boeing 747 powered by the CF6-50. This led to more variants, such as the CF6-80. The CF6-50 also powered the Boeing YC-14 USAF AMST transport prototype.

The CF6-50 was also offered with 10% less thrust, and known as CF6-45, for the 747SR, a short-range version used by All Nippon Airways for domestic Japanese operations.

The engine, known by its military designation F103, is used on the KC-10 Extenders and Boeing E-4.

Starting in 1977, a derivative known as the LM5000 was offered as an industrial gas turbine. The first unit was sold in 1978, with 30 orders by October 1, 1988.

=== CF6-80 ===
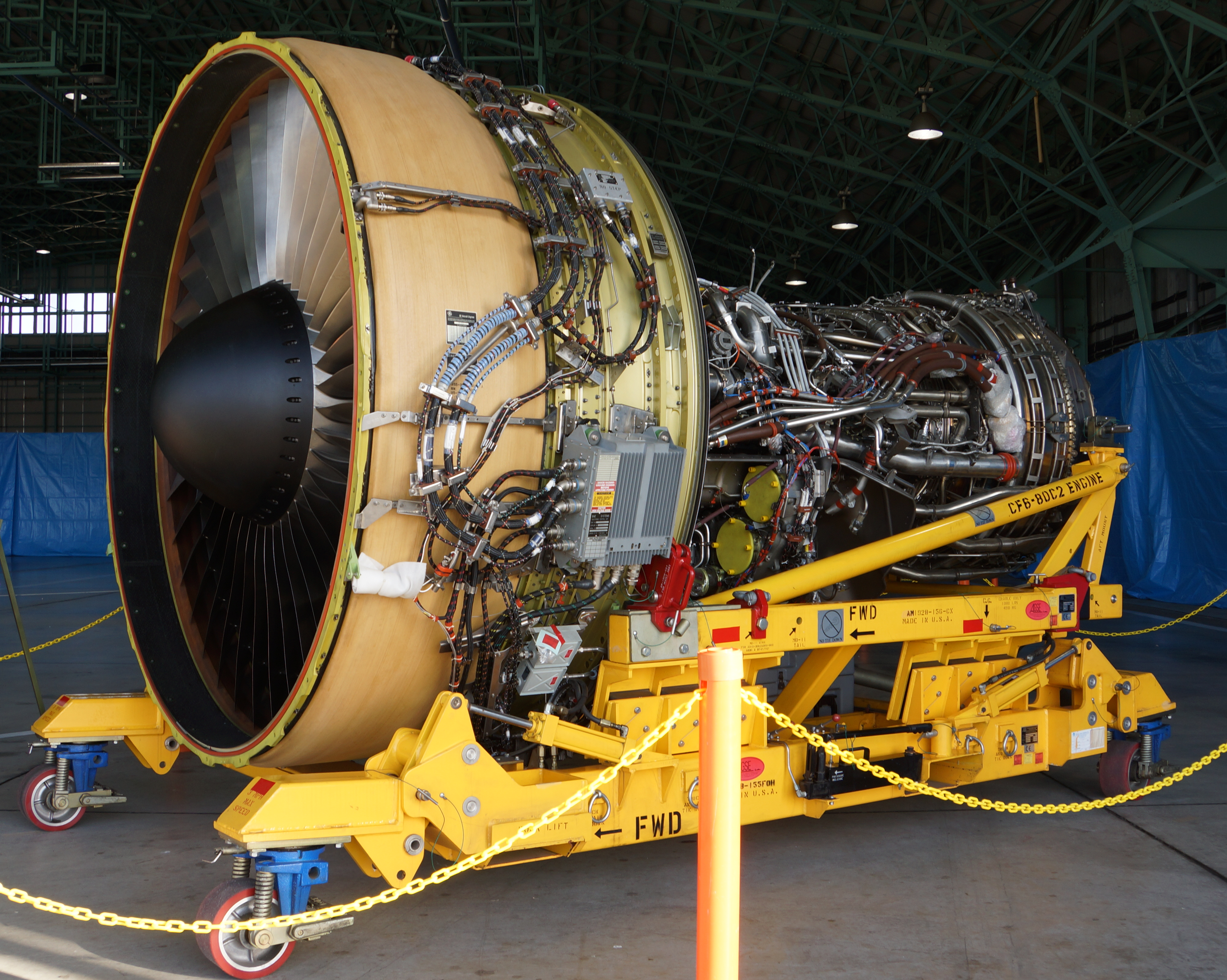
CF6-80C2K1F Engine for the Kawasaki C-2

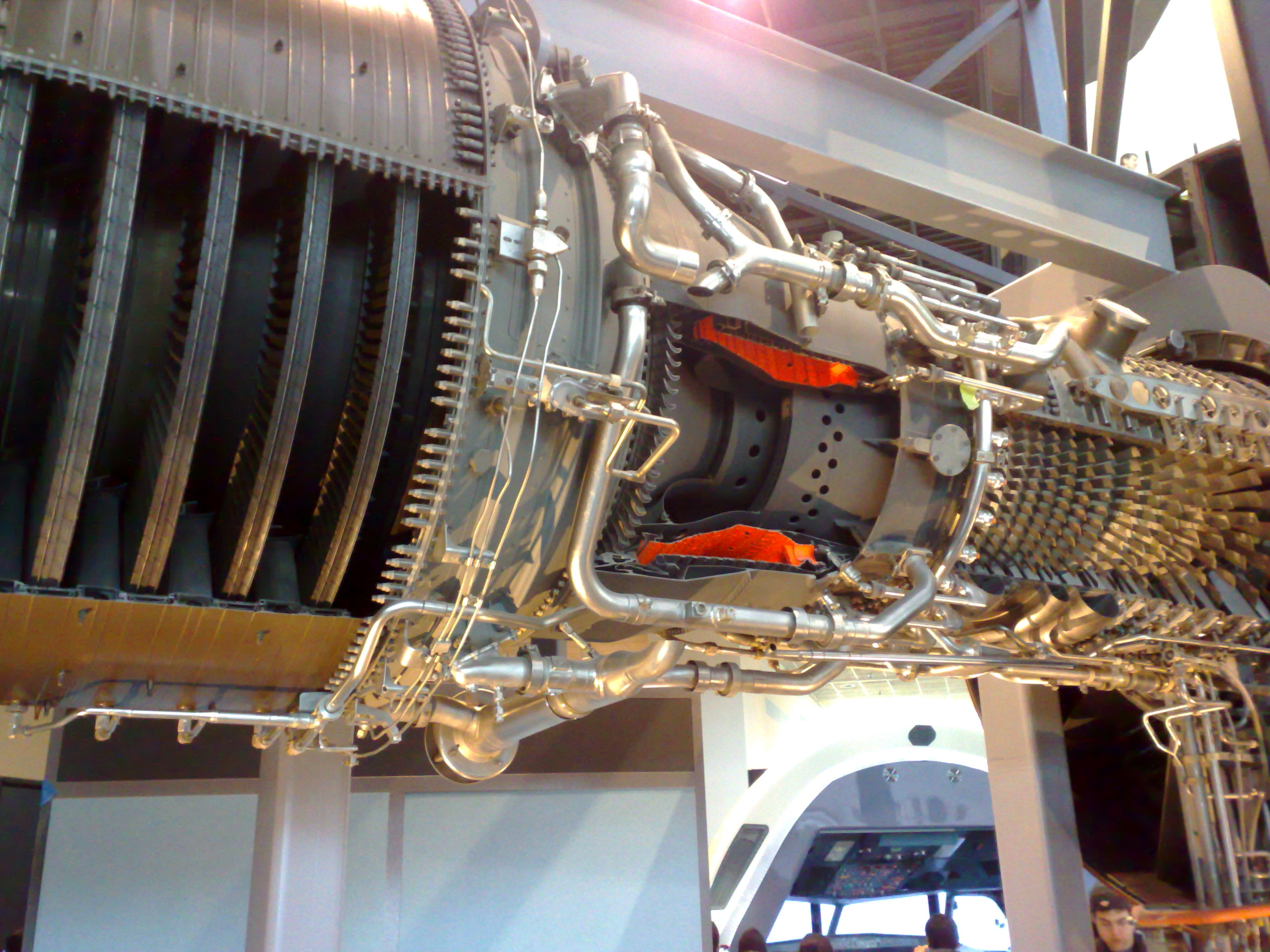
Display engine showing internal parts: compressor at right, combustor and HP turbine in center, and LP turbine at left

The CF6-80 series has a thrust range of 48,000 lbf (210 kN) to 50,000 lbf (220 kN).

There are 4 variants.

==== CF6-80A3 ====
The CF6-80A3, with thrusts from 48,000 lbf (210 kN)to 58,000 lbf (260 kN), powered two twinjets, the Boeing 767 and Airbus A310. The GE-powered 767 entered airline service in 1982, and the GE powered A310 in early 1983. It is approved for ETOPS operations.

For the CF6-80A/A1, the fan diameter remains at 86.4 in (2.19 m), with an airflow of 1435 lb/s (651 kg/s). Overall pressure ratio is 28.0, with a bypass ratio of 4.66. Static thrust is 48,000 lbf (210 kN). The basic mechanical configuration is the same as the -50 series.

==== CF6-80C2 ====
For the CF6-80C2-A1, the fan diameter is increased to 93 in (2,400 mm), with an airflow of 1,750 lb/s (790 kg/s). Overall pressure ratio is 30.4, with a bypass ratio of 5.15. Static thrust is 59,000 lbf (260 kN). An extra stage is added to the LP compressor, and a 5th to the LP turbine.

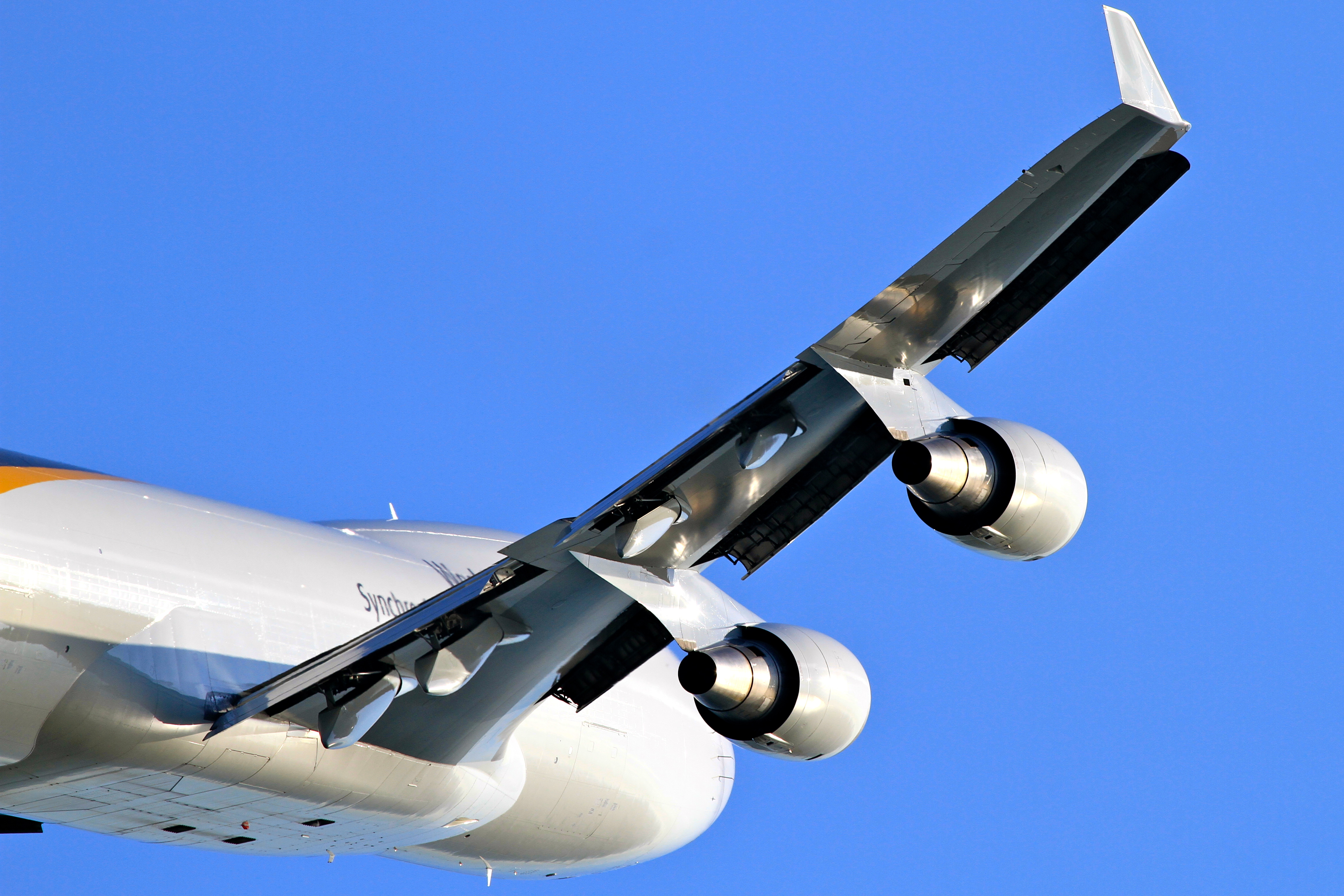
A pair of CF6-80C2 on the Boeing 747-400

The CF6-80C2 is used on fifteen commercial and military widebody aircraft including the Boeing 747-400, and McDonnell Douglas MD-11. The CF6-80C2 is also approved for ETOPS-180 for the Airbus A300, Airbus A310, Boeing 767, KC-767A/J, E-767J, Kawasaki C-2, and (as the F138) the Lockheed C-5M Super Galaxy and VC-25A.

==== F138-GE-100 ====
The F138-GE-100 is a military designation given to the modified version of the CF6-80C2, to produce 50,400–51,600 lbf (224–230 kN), with Strict Noise Regulations and Green Emissions, for the Lockheed Martin C-5M Super Galaxy. The F138 replaced the TF-39 when the Galaxy was upgraded to the Super Galaxy.

==== CF6-80E1 ====
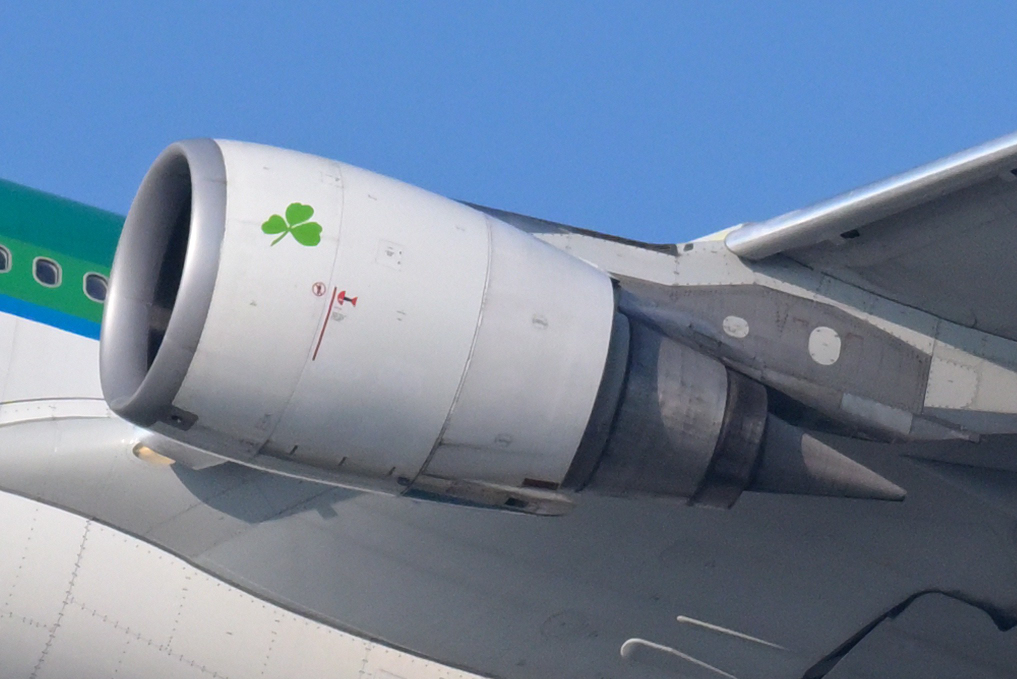
The CF6-80E1 powering the Airbus A330

The CF6-80E1 has the highest thrust of the CF6-80 Series, with the fan tip diameters increased to 96.2 in (2,440 mm), and an overall pressure ratio of 32.6 and bypass ratio of 5.3. The 68,000 to 72,000 lbf (300 to 320 kN) variant competes with the Rolls-Royce Trent 700 and the Pratt & Whitney PW4000 to power the Airbus A330.

==== Other variants ====
The industrial and marine development of the CF6-80C2, the LM6000 Series, has found wide use including fast ferry and high speed cargo ship applications, as well as in power generation. The LM6000 gas turbine family provides power in the 40 to 56 MW range for utility, industrial, and oil & gas applications.

== Applications ==
- Airbus A300/Airbus Beluga
- Airbus A310/Airbus A310 MRTT/Airbus CC-150 Polaris
- Airbus A330/Airbus A330 MRTT/EADS/Northrop Grumman KC-45
- Boeing 747/E-4/VC-25A
- Boeing 767/E-767/KC-767/E-10
- Boeing YC-14
- Kawasaki C-2
- Lockheed Martin C-5M Super Galaxy
- McDonnell Douglas DC-10/KC-10
- McDonnell Douglas MD-11

== Accidents and incidents ==
In 1973, a CF6-6 fan assembly disintegrated, resulting in the loss of cabin pressurization of National Airlines Flight 27 over New Mexico, United States.

In 1979 a CF6-6 engine detached from the left wing of American Airlines Flight 191 due to faulty pylon maintenance, severing hydraulic lines and causing the aircraft to crash.

In 1989, a CF6-6 fan disk separated from the engine and damaged all three hydraulic systems. The flight, United Airlines Flight 232, continued with no hydraulic power until it crash-landed at the airport in Sioux City, Iowa.

In 2000, the National Transportation Safety Board (NTSB) warned that the high-pressure compressor could crack.

Following a series of high-pressure turbine failures on September 6, 1997, June 7, 2000 and December 8, 2002, and resulting in 767s being written off on September 22, 2000, on June 2, 2006, the Federal Aviation Administration issued an airworthiness directive mandating inspections for over 600 engines and the NTSB believed that this number should be increased to include all -80 series engines with more than 3000 cycles since new or since last inspection. Another HP turbine failure occurred during takeoff on October 28, 2016.

In May 2010, The NTSB warned that the low-pressure turbine rotor disks could fail. Four uncontained failures of CF6-45/50 engines in the preceding two years prompted it to issue an "urgent" recommendation to increase inspections of the engines on U.S. aircraft : none of the four incidents of rotor disk unbalance and subsequent failure resulted in an accident, but parts of the engine did come through the engine casing each time.

In November 2025, UPS Airlines Flight 2976, a McDonnell Douglas MD-11 powered by three CF6-80C2D1F engines, crashed shortly after takeoff following an in-flight separation of the number one engine pylon, causing a subsequent fire and crash into a building, killing three on board and eleven on the ground. The preliminary report states the engine pylon fractured due to metal fatigue cracks. All MD-11s and DC-10s were grounded while an investigation was conducted. UPS decided to retire the type in January, 2026.

== Specifications ==
CF6 Specifications
Variant	CF6-6	CF6-50	CF6-80A	CF6-80C	CF6-80E
Type	Dual rotor, axial flow, high bypass ratio turbofan, annular combustor				
Compressor	Fan & 1 LP + 16 HP	Fan & 3 LP + 14 HP		Fan & 4 LP + 14 HP	
Turbine	2 HP + 5 LP	2 HP + 4 LP		2 HP + 5 LP	
Length	188 in (478 cm)	183 in (465 cm)	167 in (424 cm)	168 in (427 cm)	
Overall diameter	105 in (267 cm)			106–111 in (269–282 cm)	114 in (290 cm)
Fan diameter	86.4 in (219 cm)			93 in (236 cm)	96.2 in (244 cm)
Takeoff thrust	41,500 lbf (185 kN)	51,500–54,000 lbf (229–240 kN)	48,000–50,000 lbf (210–220 kN)	52,200–61,960 lbf (232.2–275.6 kN)	65,800–69,800 lbf (293–310 kN)
Pressure ratio	25–25.2	29.2–31.1	27.3–28.4	27.1–31.8	32.4–34.8
Bypass ratio	5.76–5.92	4.24–4.4	4.59–4.66	5–5.31	5–5.1
Thrust-specific fuel consumption	0.35 lb/lbf/h (9.9 g/kN/s)	0.368–0.385 lb/lbf/h (10.4–10.9 g/kN/s)	0.355–0.357 lb/lbf/h (10.1–10.1 g/kN/s)	0.307–0.344 lb/lbf/h (8.7–9.7 g/kN/s)	0.332–0.345 lb/lbf/h (9.4–9.8 g/kN/s)
Application	DC‑10‑10	747, A300, DC-10-15/30, KC‑10	767, A310	747-300, 747-400, 767, A300, A310, C‑2, C‑5M, E‑767, KC‑767, MD‑11	A330, A330 MRTT
Weight (Note: Dry, includes basic engine accessories & optional equipment)	8,176 lb (3,709 kg)	8,825–9,047 lb (4,003–4,104 kg)	8,760–8,776 lb (3,973–3,981 kg)	9,480–9,860 lb (4,300–4,470 kg)	11,225 lb (5,092 kg)
Maximum fan rpm	3,810	4,102	4,016	3,854	3,835
Maximum compressor rpm	9,925	10,761	10,859	11,055	11,105
Thrust-to-weight ratio	5.08	5.84–5.97	5.48–5.7	5.51–6.28	5.86–6.22

== See also ==
Related development

- General Electric TF39

Comparable engines

- Aviadvigatel PS-90
- Ivchenko-Progress D-18
- Pratt & Whitney JT9D
- Pratt & Whitney PW2000
- Pratt & Whitney PW4000
- Rolls-Royce RB211
- Rolls-Royce Trent 700

Related lists

- List of aircraft engines
