= General Electric LM6000 =

Gas turbine used for power generation

LM6000
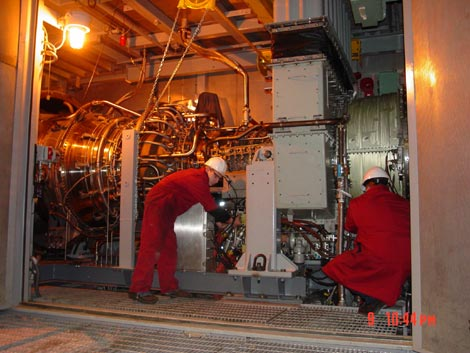
- LM6000 GTG in an electrical power plant application
- Type: Aeroderivative gas turbine
- National origin: United States
- Manufacturer: General Electric
- Developed from: General Electric CF6

The General Electric LM6000 is a turboshaft aeroderivative gas turbine engine. The LM6000 is derived from the CF6-80C2 aircraft turbofan. It has additions and modifications designed to make it more suitable for marine propulsion, industrial power generation, and marine power generation use. These include an expanded turbine section to convert thrust into shaft power, supports and struts for mounting on a steel or concrete deck, and reworked controls packages for power generation.

== Design and development ==
The LM6000 provides 54,610 shp (40,720 kW) from either end of the low-pressure rotor system, which rotates at 3,600 rpm. This twin-spool design with the low-pressure turbine operating at 60 Hz, the dominant electrical frequency in North America, eliminates the need for a conventional power turbine. Its high efficiency and installation flexibility make it ideal also for a wide variety of utility power generation and industrial applications, especially peaker and cogeneration plants.

GE has several option packages for industrial LM6000s, including SPRINT (Spray Inter-Cooled Turbine), water injection (widely known as "NOx water"), STIG (Steam Injected Gas Turbine) technology and DLE (Dry Low Emissions) which uses a combustor with premixers to maximize combustion efficiency. The SPRINT option is designed to increase efficiency and power of the turbine, while the water injection, STIG, and DLE are for reducing emissions.

The GE LM6000 PC is rated to provide more than 43 MW with a thermal efficiency of around 42% LHV at ISO conditions.

== See also ==
Related development

- General Electric CF6
- General Electric LM2500
- General Electric LMS100

Related lists

- List of aircraft engines
