= Pratt & Whitney F100 =

Afterburning turbofan engine that powers the F-15 Eagle and F-16 Fighting Falcon

F100
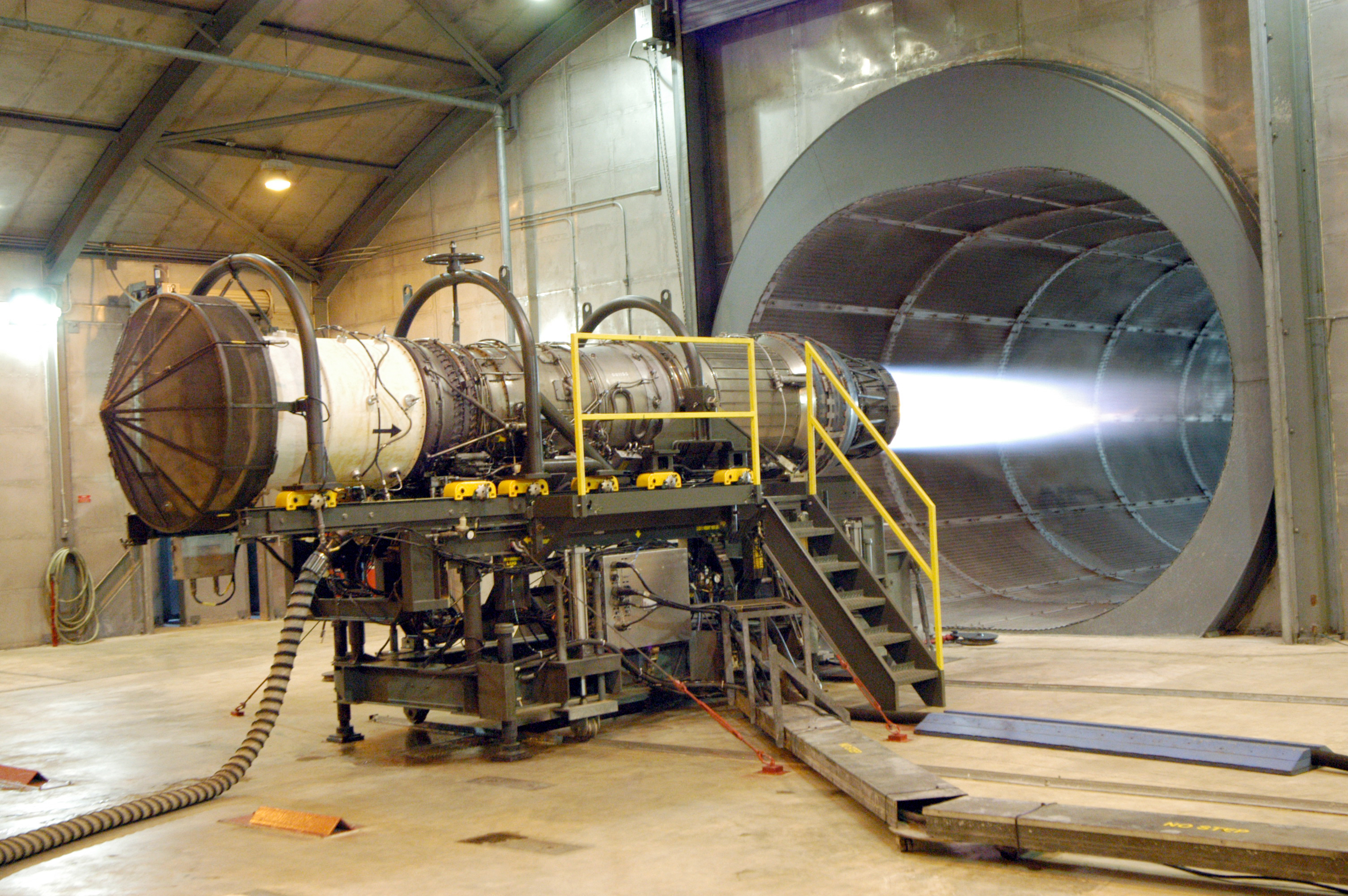
- Testing an F100 for an F-15 Eagle
- Type: Turbofan
- National origin: United States
- Manufacturer: Pratt & Whitney
- First run: 1970s
- Major applications: F-15 Eagle; F-15E Strike Eagle; F-16 Fighting Falcon; Northrop Grumman X-47B
- Developed into: Pratt & Whitney F401; Pratt & Whitney PW1120

The Pratt & Whitney F100 (company designation JTF22) is a low bypass afterburning turbofan engine. It was designed and manufactured by Pratt & Whitney to power the U.S. Air Force's "FX" initiative in 1965, which became the F-15 Eagle. The engine was to be developed in tandem with the F401 which shares a similar core but with an upscaled fan for the U.S. Navy's F-14 Tomcat. The F401 was later abandoned due to costs and reliability issues. The F100 also powered the F-16 Fighting Falcon for the Air Force's Lightweight Fighter (LWF) program.

== Development ==
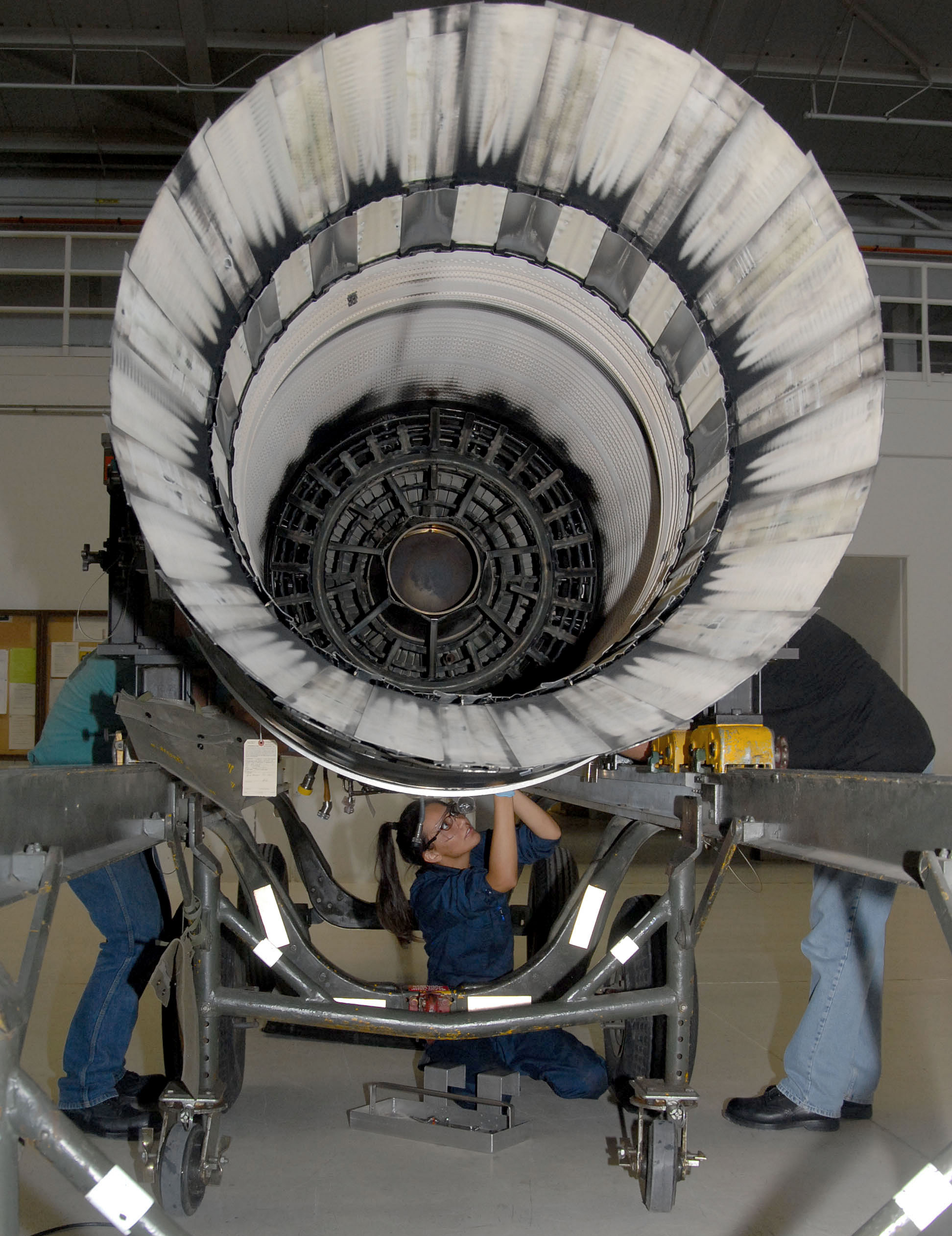
Afterburner - concentric ring structure inside the exhaust

In 1967, the United States Navy and United States Air Force issued a joint engine Request for Proposals (RFP) for the F-14 Tomcat and the FX, which became the parallel fighter design competition that led to the F-15 Eagle in 1970. This engine program was called the IEDP (Initial Engine Development Program) and was funded and managed out of the Aeronautical Systems Division (ASD) at Wright-Patterson AFB. Under ASD, a Systems Project Office Cadre was assigned to manage both the FX Aircraft and Engine definition phase. The Turbine Engine Division of the Air Force Propulsion Laboratory was employed in a support role to assist ASD Systems Engineering in evaluations of technical risks. Later upon selection of the F-15 the ASD engineering cadre became the F-15 Systems Project Office.

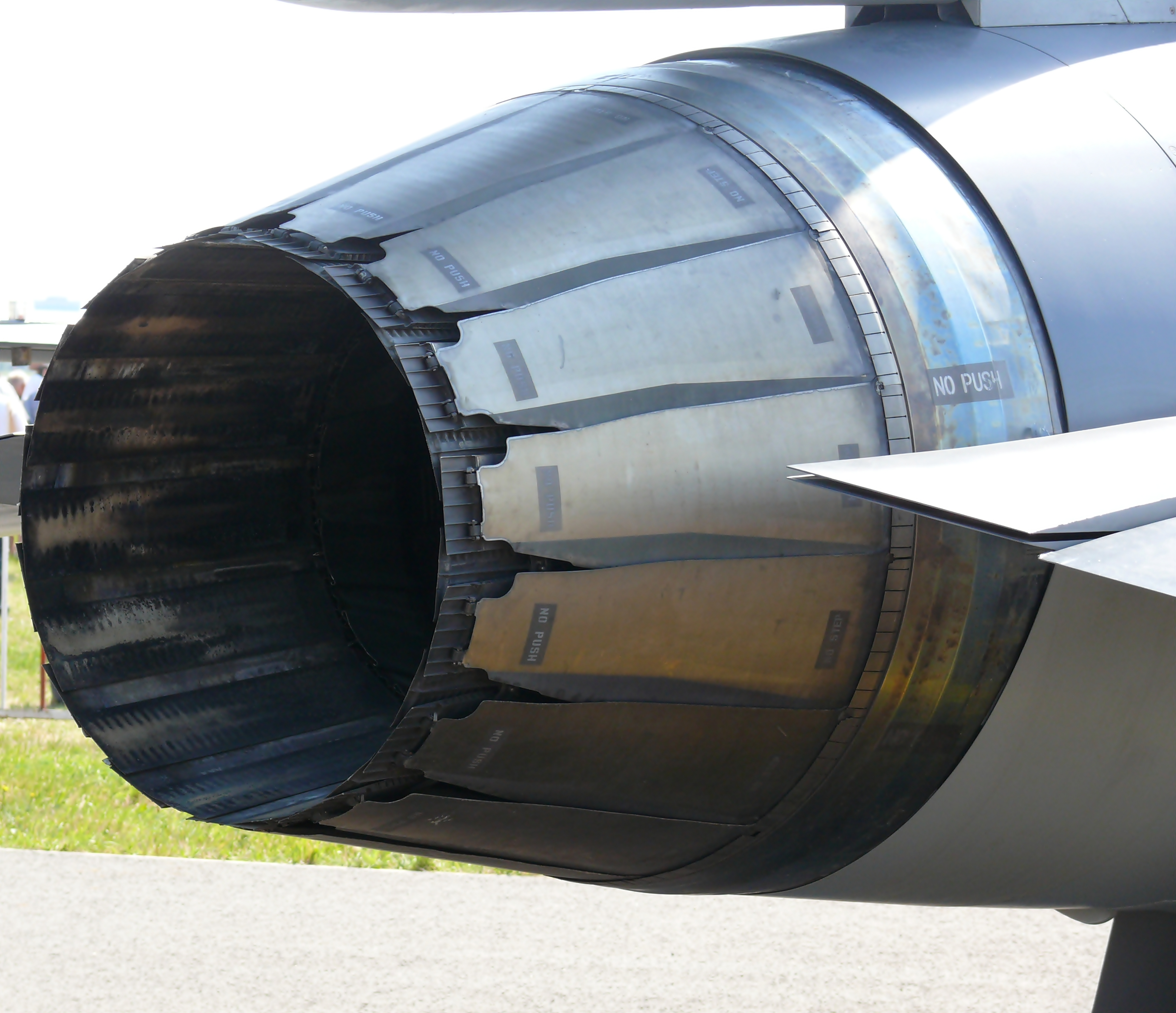
Adjustable exhaust nozzle contracted

The IEDP was created to be a competitive engine design/demonstration phase followed with a down select to one winning engine design and development program. General Electric and Pratt & Whitney were placed on contract for an approximately 18-month program with goals to improve thrust and reduce weight to achieve a thrust-to-weight ratio of 7.6. At the end of the IEDP, General Electric and Pratt & Whitney submitted proposals for their engine candidates for the aircraft that had been selected in the FX Competition, the McDonnell Douglas F-15. The Pratt & Whitney proposal was selected as the winner and the engine was designated the F100. The Air Force would award Pratt & Whitney a contract in 1970 to develop and produce the 25,000 lbf (110 kN) thrust class F100-PW-100 (USAF) and 30,000 lbf (130 kN) thrust class F401-PW-400 (USN) engines. The Navy would use the engine in the planned F-14B and the XFV-12 project but would cut back and later cancel its order after the latter's failure due to costs and reliability issues, and chose to continue to use the Pratt & Whitney TF30 engine from the F-111 in its F-14s.

== Variants ==
The F100 is a twin spool, axial flow, afterburning turbofan engine. It has a 3-stage fan driven by a two-stage low-pressure turbine and a 10-stage compressor driven by a two-stage high-pressure turbine. The initial F100-PW-100 variant generates nearly 24,000 lbf (107 kN) of thrust in full afterburner and weighs approximately 3,000 lb (1,361 kg), achieving its target thrust-to-weight ratio of 8 and providing the F-15 with its desired thrust-to-weight ratio of greater than 1:1 at combat weight.

=== PW-100/200 ===
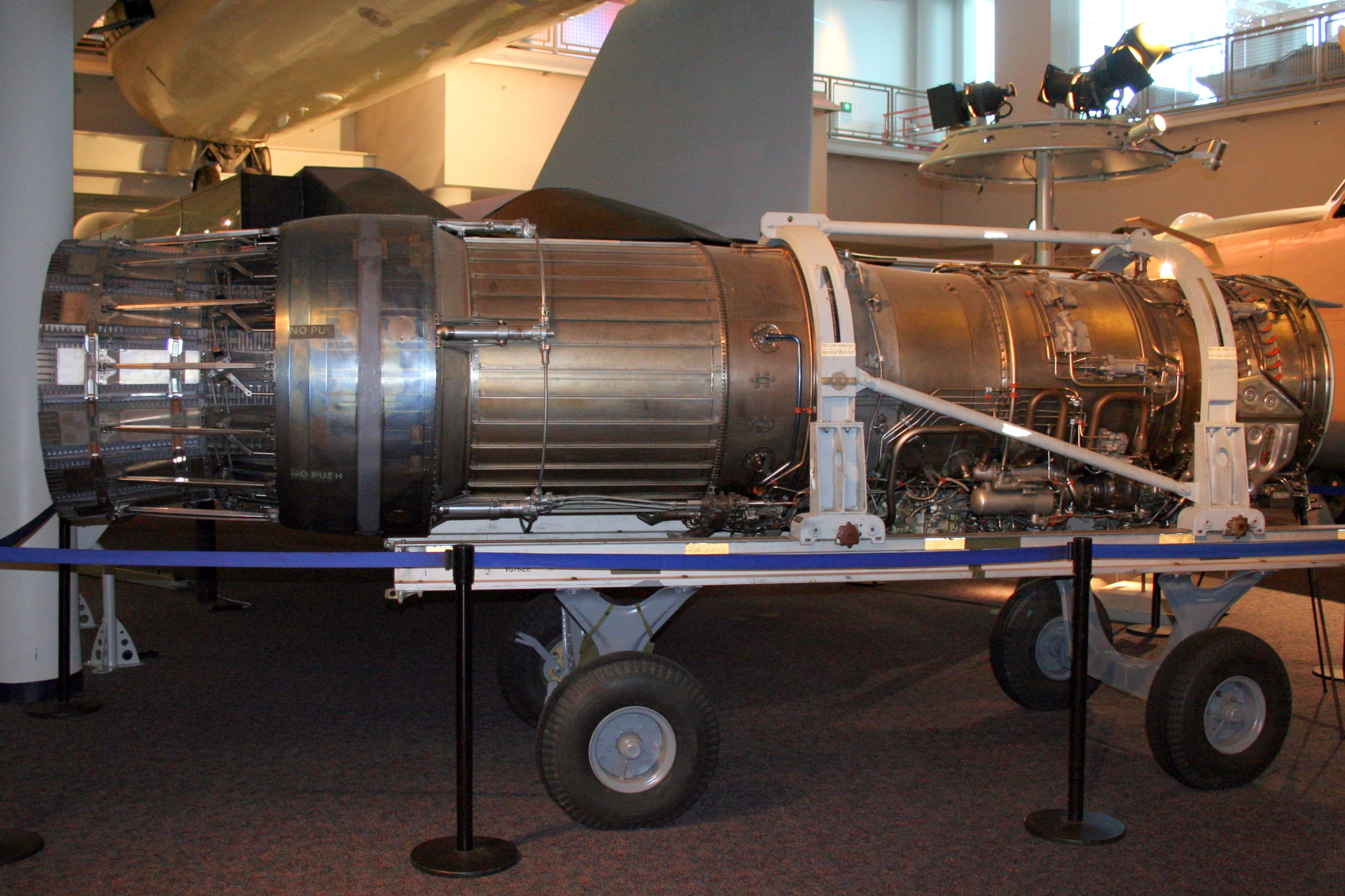
F100-PW-100 on display at the Virginia Air and Space Center

The F100-PW-100 first flew in an F-15 Eagle in 1972 with a maximum continuous power rating of 12,410 lbf (55.2 kN), military power of 14,690 lbf (65.3 kN), and afterburning thrust of 23,930 lbf (106.4 kN) with 5-minute limit. Due to the advanced nature of engine stemming from ambitious performance goals, numerous problems were encountered in its early days of service including high wear, stalling and "hard" afterburner starts. These "hard" starts could be caused by failure of the afterburner to start or by extinguishing after start, in either case the large jets of jet fuel were lit by the engine exhaust resulting in high pressure waves causing the engine to stall; these stagnation stalls usually occurred at high Mach and high altitude, and could seriously damage the turbine if the condition was not corrected. The problems were contributed by pilots making much more abrupt throttle changes than previous fighters and engines due to the excess thrust available. Early problems were eventually solved by the development of the F100-PW-220 in the early 1980s, which the -100 could be upgraded to.

The F-16 Fighting Falcon entered service with the F100-PW-200; compared to the -100, the -200 had some additional redundancies for single-engine reliability as well as almost identical thrust ratings. In particular, a "proximate splitter" — an extension of the internal casing behind the fan that splits the core and bypass airflow — was introduced on the -200 that reduced the severity of the high pressure waves from "hard" afterburner starts. This greatly reduced the rate of stagnation stalls, and the -200 on the F-16 saw much better reliability than the -100 on the F-15, although some of the issues from the -100 remained. Similarly, these problems were eventually solved by the F100-220, which the -200 could be upgraded to as well.

==== Specifications (F100-100/200) ====
Data from DTIC, Smithsonian National Air and Space Museum

==== General characteristics ====
- Type: Afterburning turbofan
- Length: 191 inches (485 cm)
- Diameter: 34.8 inches (88 cm) inlet, 46.5 inches (118 cm) maximum external
- Dry weight: 3,035 pounds (1,377 kg)

==== Components ====
- Compressor: Dual Spool Axial compressor with 3-stage fan, 10-stage compressor
- Combustors: annular
- Turbine: 2-stage high pressure, 2-stage low-pressure

==== Performance ====
- Maximum thrust:
  - 12,410 pounds-force (55.2 kN) dry thrust, continuous,
  - 14,690 pounds-force (65.3 kN) military/intermediate power,
  - 23,930 pounds-force (106.4 kN) with full afterburner
- Overall pressure ratio: 24:1
- Air mass flow: 224 lb/s (102 kg/s)
- Thrust-to-weight ratio: 7.88:1

=== PW-220/220E ===
Due to the unsatisfactory reliability, maintenance costs, and service life of the F100-100/200, Pratt & Whitney embarked on an extensive upgrade program in order to address these issues. The Air Force also began funding the General Electric F101 Derivative Fighter Engine, which eventually became the F110, as a competitor to the F100 to coerce more urgency from Pratt & Whitney. The result of Pratt & Whitney's improvement efforts was the F100-PW-220, which eliminates almost all stall-stagnations and augmentor instability issues from the -100/200 as well as doubling time between depot overhauls. Reliability and maintenance costs were also drastically improved, and the engine incorporates a digital electronic engine control (DEEC). The -220 engine produces static thrust of 14,590 lbf (64.9 kN) in military (intermediate) power and 23,770 lbf (105.7 kN) afterburning, very slightly lower than the static thrust of the -100/200, but the -220 has better dynamic thrust across most of the envelope.

The F100-220 was introduced in 1986 and was installed on the F-15 and F-16, gradually replacing the -100/200. Seeking a way to drive unit costs down, the USAF implemented the Alternate Fighter Engine (AFE) program in 1984 (nicknamed "The Great Engine War"), under which the engine contract would be awarded through competition; the -220 would be Pratt & Whitney's initial offering in the AFE program, competing with the General Electric F110-GE-100. The F-16C/D Block 30/32s were the first to be built with the common engine bay, able to accept the existing F100-200/220 engine (Block 32) or the F110-100 (Block 30). A non-afterburning variant, the F100-PW-220U powers the Northrop Grumman X-47B UCAV. The -100 and -200 series engines could be upgraded to become equivalent to -220 specifications; the "E" abbreviation from 220E is for "equivalent" and given to engines which have been upgraded as such.

Pratt & Whitney proposed a further upgrade of the -220 that would incorporate technology from the company's PW1128 project. The proposal would match the -220 core to the advanced higher airflow fan and also incorporate revised DEEC and low-pressure turbine improvements; the proposed engine would weigh 3,385 lb (1,535 kg) and produce 16,700 lbf (74.3 kN) in intermediate power and 27,000 lbf (120 kN) in full afterburner. This upgrade was sometimes unofficially referred to as the F100-PW-220P, but was ultimately not pursued.

==== Specifications (F100-220) ====
Data from DTIC, Florida International University, National Museum of the U.S. Air Force

==== General characteristics ====
- Type: Afterburning turbofan
- Length: 191 inches (485 cm)
- Diameter: 34.8 inches (88 cm) inlet, 46.5 inches (118 cm) maximum external
- Dry weight: 3,234 pounds (1,467 kg)

==== Components ====
- Compressor: Dual Spool Axial compressor with 3-stage fan, 10-stage compressor
- Bypass ratio: 0.63:1
- Combustors: annular
- Turbine: 2-stage high pressure, 2-stage low-pressure

==== Performance ====
- Maximum thrust:
  - 14,590 pounds-force (64.9 kN) military/intermediate power,
  - 23,770 pounds-force (105.7 kN) with afterburner
- Overall pressure ratio: 25:1
- Air mass flow: 228 lb/s (103 kg/s)
- Specific fuel consumption: Intermediate Power: (0.73 lb/(lbf·h))
- Thrust-to-weight ratio: 7.4:1

=== PW-229 ===
The F100-PW-229 and its competitor, the General Electric F110-GE-129, were the result of the USAF seeking greater power for its tactical aircraft through the Improved Performance Engine (IPE) program in the 1980s. It incorporated many of the technologies developed from the company's PW1128 project, including the new fan and low-pressure turbine, a new higher airflow core design, and enhanced DEEC system. Compared to earlier variants, the -229 has a higher turbine inlet temperature, higher fan airflow of 248 lb/s (112 kg/s), and lower bypass ratio; in addition to greater thrust, the -229 has improved reliability and durability. The first engine was flown in 1989 and produced thrust of 17,800 lbf (79.2 kN) (dry/intermediate thrust) and 29,160 lbf (129.7 kN) with augmentation. The -229 powers late model F-16C/D Block 52s, F-16V Block 72s and F-15Es. Visually, the -229 can be distinguished from the -100/200/220 by its black composite external nozzle flaps, or "turkey feathers", when mounted rather than the metallic ones of the earlier variants.

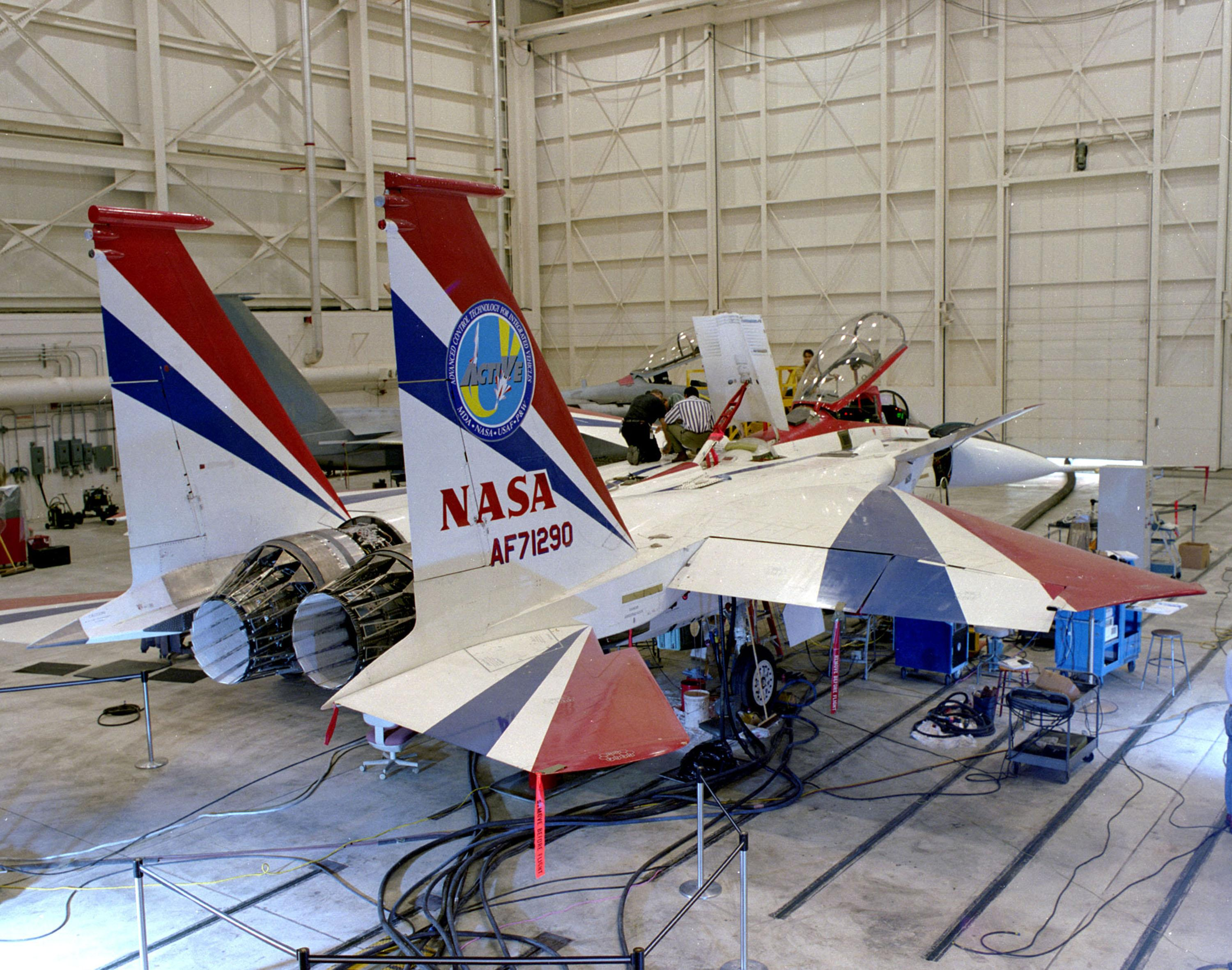
The F-15 ACTIVE showing its 3D axisymmetric thrust vectoring nozzles on its F100-PW-229s.

A variant of the -229 fitted with a 3-dimensional axisymmetric thrust vectoring nozzle, referred by Pratt & Whitney as the Pitch/Yaw Balance Beam Nozzle (P/YBBN), was tested on the F-15 ACTIVE (Advanced Control Technology for Integrated Vehicles) in the 1990s. The nozzle could vector the exhaust up to 20 degrees from the axial line in any direction.

In 2007, the F100-PW-229EEP (Engine Enhancement Package) began development to increase reliability and number of accumulated cycles between depot overhauls. This was done by applying technology from the F100-PW-232 (see below), which in turn incorporated technology and advancements from the F119 program for the F-22, as well as (for -229EEP) from the F135 program for the F-35; the -229EEP incorporates updated turbine materials, cooling management techniques, compressor aerodynamics, split cases (top and bottom) and updated DEEC software. Deliveries of the -229EEP began in 2009 and existing -229s can be upgraded to this configuration during scheduled depot maintenance.

==== Specifications (F100-229) ====
Data from Pratt & Whitney

==== General characteristics ====
- Type: Afterburning turbofan
- Length: 191 inches (485 cm)
- Diameter: 34.8 inches (88 cm) inlet, 46.5 inches (118 cm) maximum external
- Dry weight: 3,829 pounds (1,737 kg)

==== Components ====
- Compressor: Dual Spool Axial compressor with 3 fan and 10 compressor stages
- Bypass ratio: 0.36:1
- Combustors: annular
- Turbine: 2 low-pressure and 2 high-pressure stages

==== Performance ====
- Maximum thrust:
  - 17,800 pounds-force (79 kN) intermediate power
  - 29,160 pounds-force (129.7 kN) with afterburner
- Overall pressure ratio: 32:1
- Air mass flow: 248 lb/s (112 kg/s)
- Turbine inlet temperature: 2,460 °F (1,350 °C; 1,620 K)
- Specific fuel consumption: Intermediate Power: 0.76 lb/(lbf·h) (77.5 kg/(kN·h)) Full afterburner: 1.94 lb/(lbf·h) (197.8 kg/(kN·h))
- Thrust-to-weight ratio: 7.8:1

=== PW-232 ===
The F100-PW-232, originally called F100-PW-229A (Advanced), was a further enhanced variant that incorporated engineering advances and technology from Pratt & Whitney's F119 engine for the F-22 as well as operational experience from the -229; development began in the late 1990s. Both the -232 and its competitor, the General Electric F110-GE-132, were designed to make full use of the F-16's Modular Common Inlet Duct (MCID), or "Big Mouth" inlet introduced in the Block 30 variant. The fan module, using F119 technology, was redesigned for increased airflow of 275 lb/s (125 kg/s) and greater reliability; it incorporated stages with wide chord blades and disk formed into a single piece called an integrally-blades rotor (IBR), or blisk. The stators were also redesigned for better aerodynamics to improve stall margin. The larger, longer fan module also resulted in the afterburner section being shortened to maintain the same footprint as the -229. The -232 could produce 20,100 lbf (89.4 kN) of thrust in intermediate power and 32,500 lbf (144.6 kN) in afterburner; alternatively it could produce the same thrust levels as the -229 but increase inspection intervals by 40%. The -232 was not pursued by the USAF, but many of the improvements were incorporated into the -229EEP to increase its reliability and inspection intervals.

==== Specifications (F100-229A/232) ====
Data from Pratt & Whitney, Flight International

==== General characteristics ====
- Type: Afterburning turbofan
- Length: 191 inches (485 cm)
- Diameter: 34.8 inches (88 cm) inlet, 46.5 inches (118 cm) maximum external
- Dry weight: 4,100 pounds (1,900 kg)

==== Components ====
- Compressor: Dual Spool Axial compressor with 3 fan and 10 compressor stages
- Combustors: annular
- Turbine: 2 low-pressure and 2 high-pressure stages

==== Performance ====
- Maximum thrust:
  - 20,100 pounds-force (89 kN) intermediate power
  - 32,500 pounds-force (145 kN) with afterburner
- Air mass flow: 275 lb/s (125 kg/s)
- Thrust-to-weight ratio: 7.92:1

=== Derivatives ===
The F401 was the naval development of the F100 and designed in tandem. It was intended to power the F-14B Tomcat and Rockwell XFV-12, but the engine was canceled due to costs and development issues. The PW1120 turbofan was a smaller derivative of the F100; it was installed as a modification to a single F-4E fighter jet, and powered the canceled IAI Lavi.

Pratt & Whitney also developed an experimental engine, the PW1128, as part of the F100 Engine Model Derivative (EMD) program. Technologies developed under this program include a higher airflow and high pressure ratio fan, improved compressor and hot section components, and enhancements to the DEEC. Two PW1128 engines were flight tested on an F-15 for the F100 EMD as well as the related Highly Integrated Digital Electronic Control (HIDEC), Adaptive Engine Control System (ADECS), Performance Seeking Control (PSC), and Propulsion Controlled Aircraft (PCA) programs. Technology from the PW1128 would be incorporated into the F100-229 IPE as well as other improvement proposals.

== Applications ==
- General Dynamics F-16 Fighting Falcon (-200, -220, -229)
- McDonnell Douglas F-15 Eagle (-100, -220)
- McDonnell Douglas F-15E Strike Eagle (-220, -229)
- Northrop Grumman X-47B (-220U)
- Vought YA-7F (-220)

== See also ==
Related development

- Pratt & Whitney F401
- Pratt & Whitney PW1120

Comparable engines

- General Electric F110
- Klimov RD-33
- Saturn AL-31
- Shenyang WS-10

Related lists

- List of aircraft engines

== Bibliography ==
- Connors, Jack (2010). The Engines of Pratt & Whitney: A Technical History. American Institute of Aeronautics and Astronautics (AIAA). doi:10.2514/4.867293. ISBN 978-1-60086-711-8.
- McDermott, John F. (1972). "F100/F401 Augmented Turbofan Engines - High Thrust-to-Weight Propulsion Systems". SAE Technical Paper Series. Vol. 1. doi:10.4271/720842. ISSN 0148-7191.
- Fernandez, Ronald (1983), Excess Profits: The Rise of United Technologies, Boston: Addison-Wesley, ISBN 9780201104844.
