= Vought Model 1600 =

Proposed fighter aircraft

Model 1600
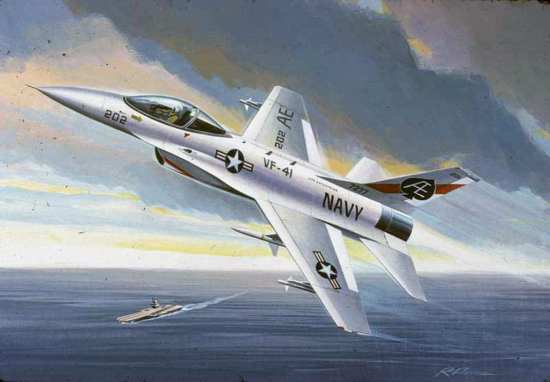
- Artist's concept of the Model 1600

General information
- Type: Carrier-based fighter
- Manufacturer: Vought / General Dynamics
- Status: Canceled
- Primary user: United States Navy (intended)

History
- Developed from: General Dynamics F-16 Fighting Falcon

The Vought/General Dynamics Model 1600 series was a fighter aircraft proposal for the United States Navy's Navy Air Combat Fighter (NACF) program. The Model 1600 was a carrier-based derivative of the General Dynamics F-16 Fighting Falcon, but lost to the Northrop/McDonnell Douglas F/A-18 Hornet.

== Development ==
Following the YF-16's victory over the Northrop YF-17 for the U.S. Air Force's Air Combat Fighter program, General Dynamics decided a navalized variant of the F-16 could also be suitable in the Navy's Navy Air Combat Fighter (NACF) program. Having no carrier aircraft experience, General Dynamics teamed up with Vought (LTV Aerospace), which had designed the successful carrier-capable F-8 Crusader and A-7 Corsair II for the Navy. If selected, Vought would have produced the carrier version of the F-16.

Vought created three concepts for the navalized F-16. The main proposal was the Model 1600, which was based on the Block 10 F-16, which featured structural strengthening, an arrestor hook, and a more robust undercarriage to accommodate carrier launch and recovery operations. The Model 1600 featured the Pratt & Whitney F401, but two other powerplant choices were also explored. The Model 1601 had an improved Pratt & Whitney F100, while the Model 1602 used the General Electric F101. The aircraft was to be armed with AIM-7 Sparrow missiles. Launch rails were to be added on the sides of the intake for AIM-9 Sidewinder missiles. However, the Navy preferred a twin-engine aircraft, among other reasons, and on 2 May 1975 it selected the Northrop-McDonnell Douglas YF-17-based Model 267 proposal, which became the F/A-18 Hornet.

== Variants ==
Model 1600
A strengthened version of the F-16 Block 10 with carrier arrestor hook and revised nosewheel. It was powered by the Pratt & Whitney F401 (JTF22A-26C) afterburning turbofan.
Model 1601
Similar to Model 1600, except equipped with an upgraded Pratt & Whitney F100 (JTF22B-25) afterburning turbofan.
Model 1602
Similar to Model 1601, except with a General Electric F101-100 engine, a further enlarged fuselage, and avionics and armament changes.
Model 1602B
Final submission in March 1975; least like the F-16.

== Specifications (Model 1600) ==
Data from Secret Projects: Fighters & Interceptors 1945–1978

General characteristics

- Crew: 1
- Length: 52 ft 4 in (16 m)
- Wingspan: 33 ft 3 in (10.1 m)
- Wing area: 369 sq ft (34.3 m^{2})
- Max takeoff weight: 31,231 lb (14,166 kg)
- Powerplant: 1 × Pratt & Whitney F401 afterburning turbofan, 18,370 lbf (81.7 kN) thrust dry, 29,360 lbf (130.6 kN) with afterburner

Performance

== See also ==
Related development

- General Dynamics F-16 Fighting Falcon
- General Dynamics F-16XL
- General Dynamics X-62 VISTA

Aircraft of comparable role, configuration, and era

- McDonnell Douglas F/A-18 Hornet
- Northrop YF-17

Related lists

- List of active United States military aircraft
- List of fighter aircraft
