= Convair Model 200 =

American VTOL fighter proposal

Model 200
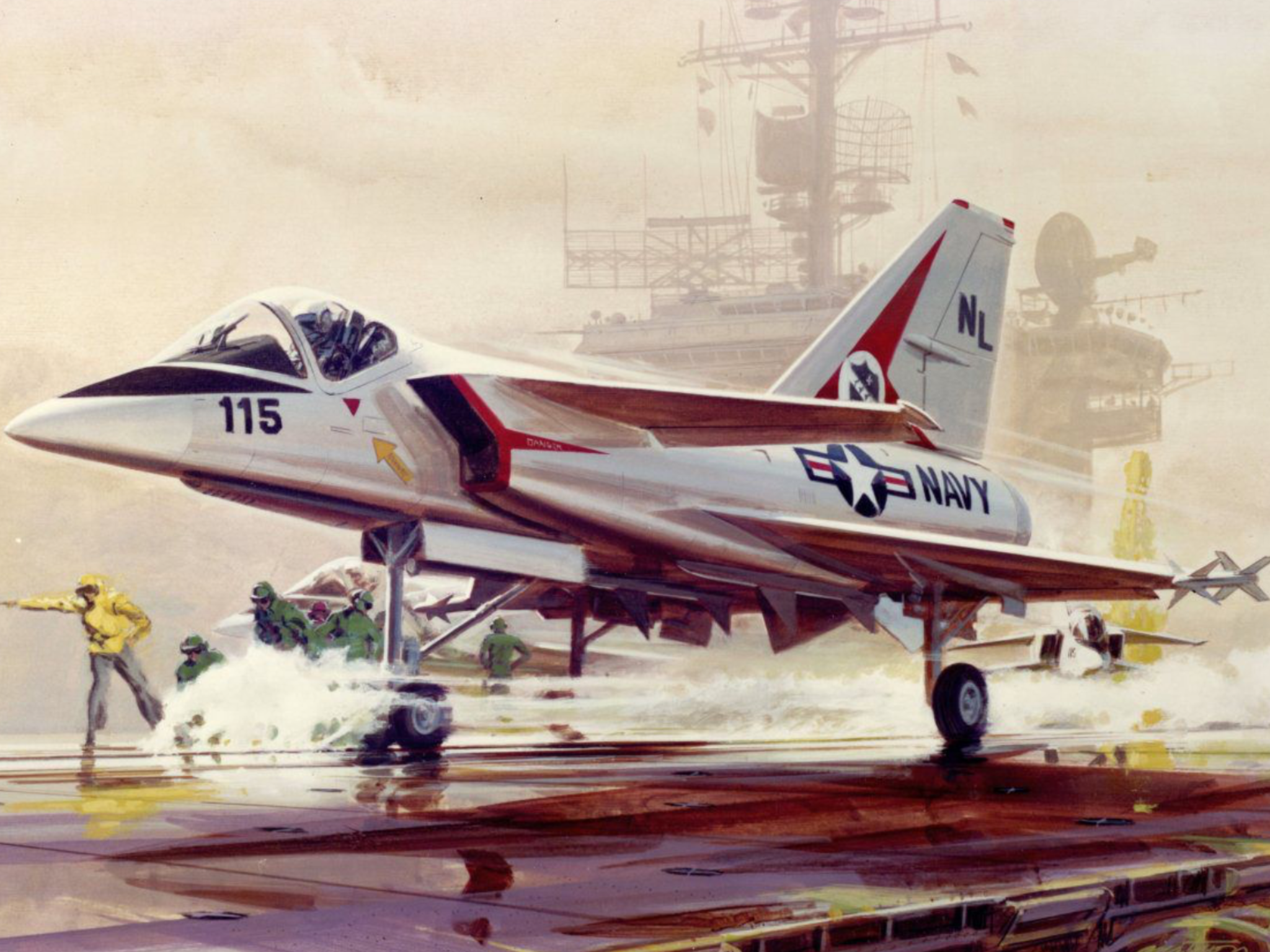
- Convair Model 200

General information
- Type: Fighter
- National origin: United States
- Manufacturer: Convair

The Convair Model 200 was a design for a supersonic vertical takeoff and landing (VTOL) fighter requirement for the United States Navy Sea Control Ship. Further versions were planned for conventional catapult launches and landing using arresting gear.

== Design and development ==
The Convair Model 200 was designed in 1973 as a single-jet fighter, that could be built in both vertical takeoff and landing (VTOL) (model 200A) and conventional takeoff and landing (CTOL) configurations (Model 201A). For the CTOL, the single Pratt & Whitney JTF22A-26A with tail hook, canard with flap, and CTOL tail cone. For the VTOL operations, the single Pratt & Whitney JTF22A-30A with a jet exhaust pipe tiltable by 90 degrees using a three-bearing swivel nozzle, and two additional lifting engines with 46.7 kN thrust each were provided behind the cockpit. The lifting engines and the swiveling nozzles were eliminated in the CTOL versions. The top speed was Mach 2. The wingspan was 27 feet 10.5 inches (8.496 m); the length was 51 feet 1.5 inches (15.583 m). The Model 200 had a cruise engine, a swept tail, two ventral fins under the fuselage, delta wings and delta canards directly behind the rectangular air intakes.

The Model 200 was proposed in a US Navy competition for a small VTOL fighter that could be carried by the Sea Control Ship, the small aircraft carriers that the US Navy was planning at the time. Neither the Model 200 nor the SCS were built. However, a competitor of the Model 200, the Rockwell XFV-12 fighter aircraft, was built. The XFV-12, which could not demonstrate vertical flight, was far from meeting expectations, and the project was canceled before the second XFV-12 was completed. Various models for wind tunnel tests were built for the Convair Model 200, as well as a model for researching the air currents during vertical takeoff and landing. Furthermore, a 1:1 front fuselage model including a complete cockpit layout was built.

The JTF22A-30A's swivel nozzle design would lay the groundwork for nozzle design of the F135-PW-600 on the Lockheed Martin F-35B.

== Variants ==
Convair Model 200A
single-seater vertical take-off with two lifting engines behind the cockpit and swiveling main engine exhaust, nose gear with one wheel.
Convair Model 201
single-seat carrier aircraft, without lifting engines, in this version there is additional internal fuel with conventional afterburning engine, nose gear with two wheels and catapult launch bar and an arrestor hook for arrested landings. In the case of the vertical take-off version, the nose landing gear moves forward into the landing gear shaft under the cockpit, the nose landing gear of the CTOL version retracts to the rear.
Convair Model 201 Trainer
just like Convair Model 201, instead of the fuel tank behind the cockpit, enlarged cockpit for two crew in tandem arrangement.

== Gallery ==
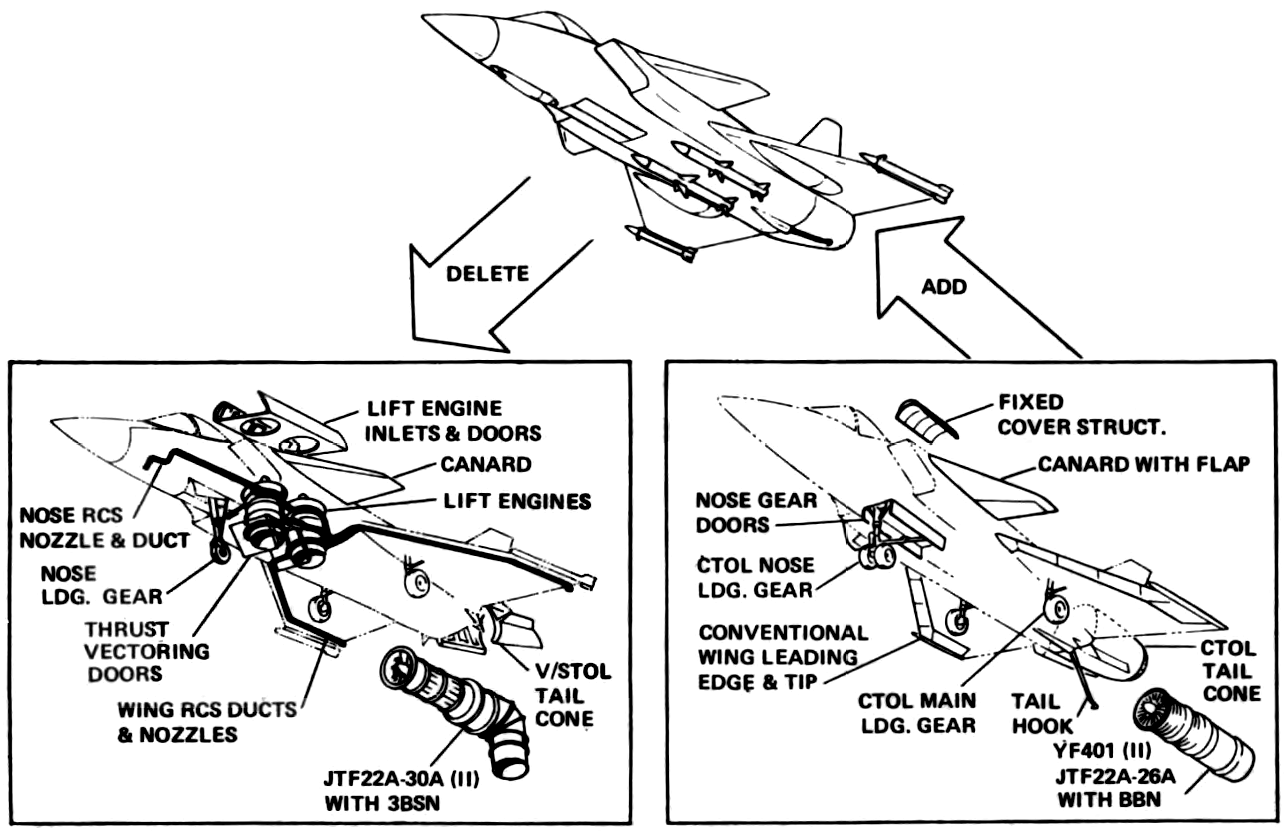
Convair Model 200A Modifications

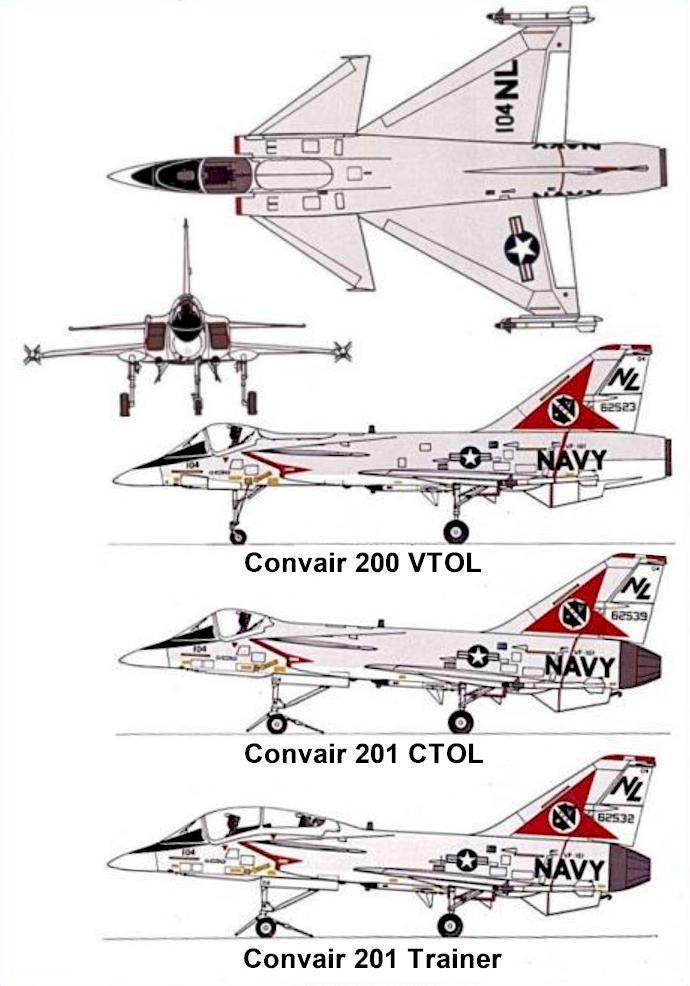
Convair Model 200 Series

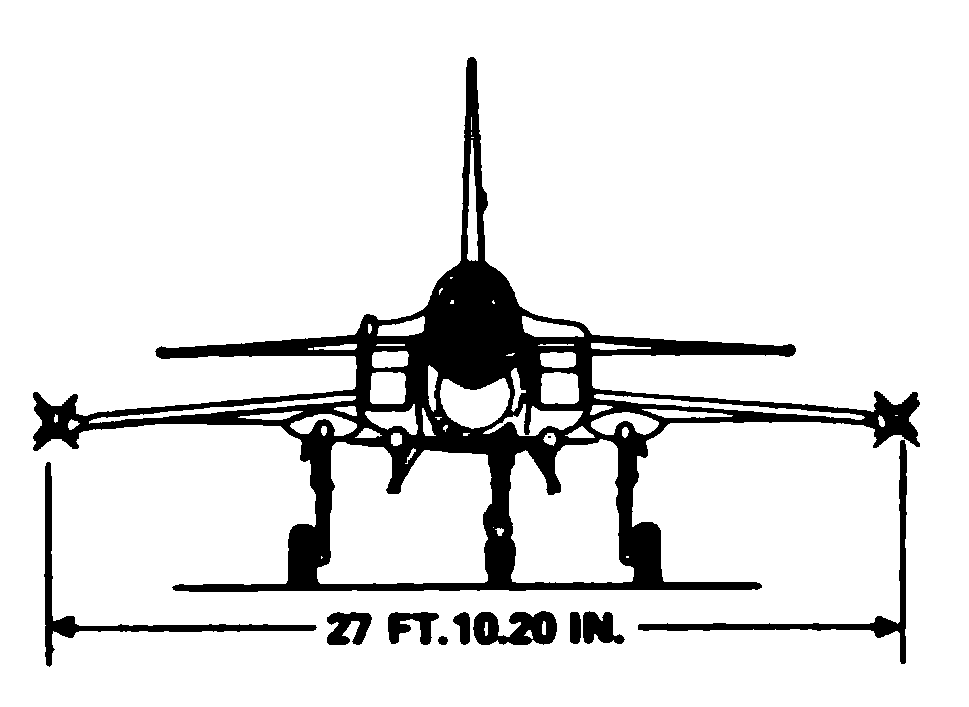
Convair Model 200A (front view)

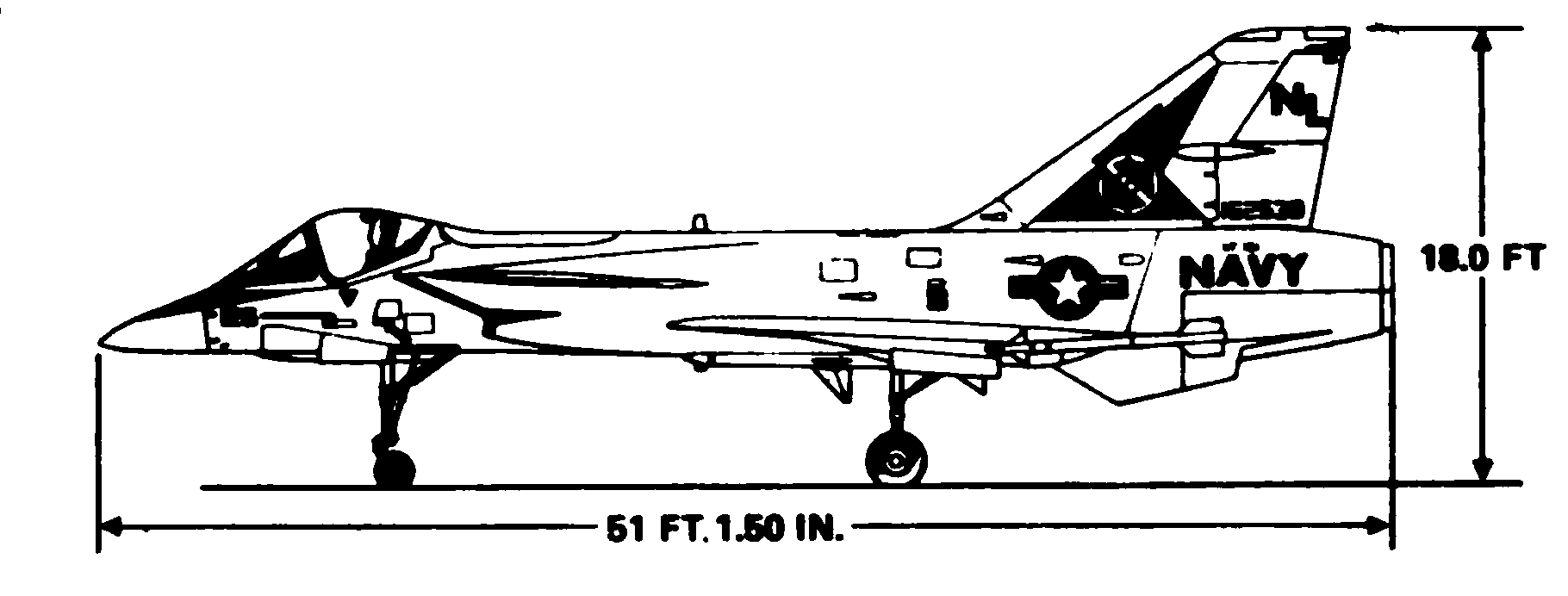
Convair Model 200A (side view)

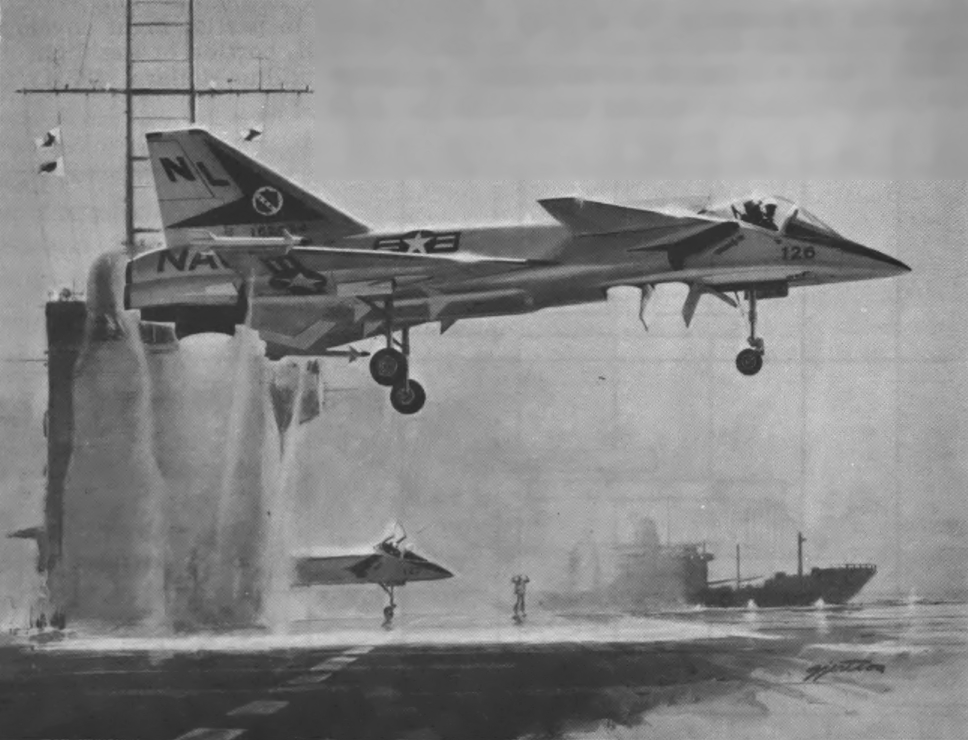
Convair Model 200

== Specifications (Model 200A) ==
Data from General Dynamics Aircraft and their Predecessors

General characteristics

- Crew: 1
- Length: 51 ft 1.5 in (15.583 m)
- Wingspan: 27 ft 10.5 in (8.496 m)
- Height: 18 ft (5.5 m)
- Powerplant: 1 × Pratt & Whitney F401-PW-400 turbofan engine
- Powerplant: 2 × Rolls-Royce/Allison XJ99 turbofan engines, 9,000 lbf (40 kN) thrust each (lift-jets)

Performance

- Maximum speed: Mach 2
