= Pratt & Whitney F401 =

Turbofan Engine

F401
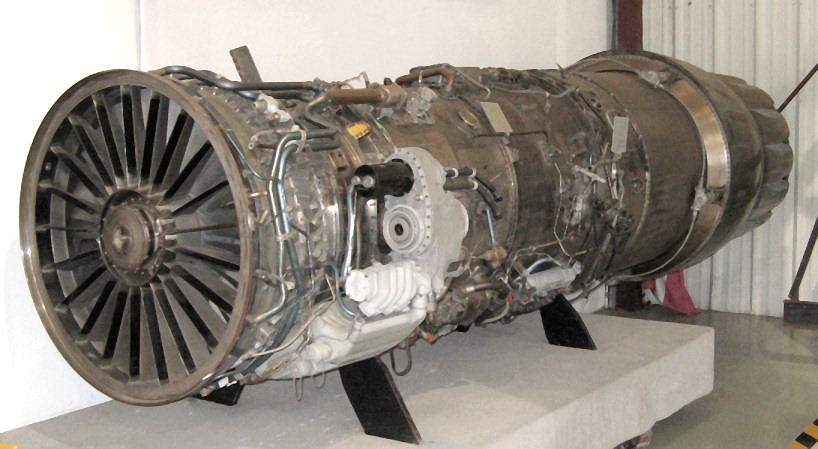
- An F401 in the Valiant Air Command Warbird Museum, Titusville, Florida
- Type: Turbofan
- National origin: United States
- Manufacturer: Pratt & Whitney
- First run: 1970s
- Major applications: Grumman F-14B Tomcat; Rockwell XFV-12
- Developed from: Pratt & Whitney F100

The Pratt & Whitney F401 (company designation JTF22) was an afterburning turbofan engine developed by Pratt & Whitney in tandem with the company's F100. The F401 was intended to power the Grumman F-14 Tomcat and Rockwell XFV-12, but the engine was canceled due to costs and development issues.

== Design and development ==
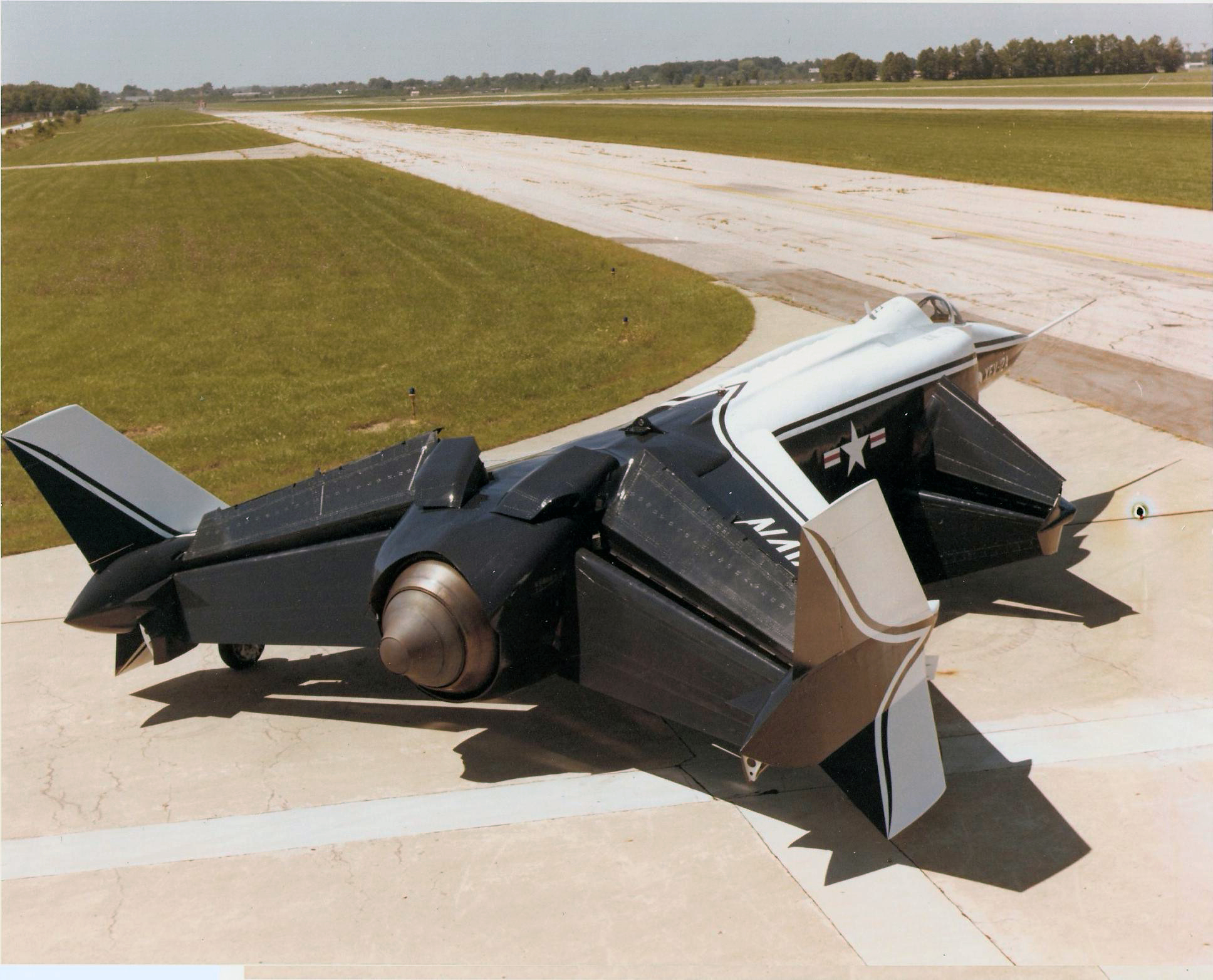
XFV-12A with F401 exhaust nozzle closed

In 1967, the United States Air Force and United States Navy issued a joint engine Request for Proposals (RFP) for the Grumman F-14 Tomcat and the FX, the fighter design competition that led to the McDonnell Douglas F-15 Eagle in 1970. This engine program was called the Initial Engine Development Program (IEDP), and was funded and managed out of the Aeronautical Systems Division (ASD) at Wright-Patterson Air Force Base.

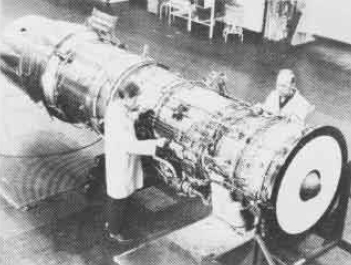
An F401 in 1972, for the planned F-14B

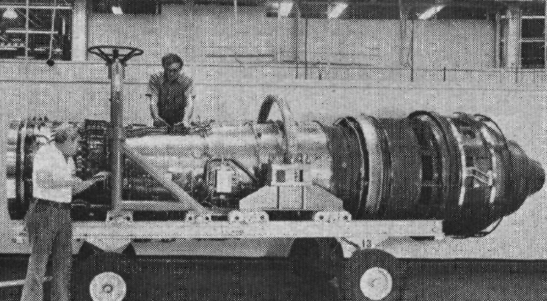
An F401 engine for Rockwell XFV-12 prototype supersonic VTOL fighter

The IEDP was created to be a competitive engine design/demonstration phase followed with a down select to one winning engine design and development program. General Electric and Pratt & Whitney were placed on contract for an approximately 18-month program with goals to improve thrust and reduce weight to achieve a thrust-to-weight ratio of 8. At the end of the IEDP, General Electric and Pratt & Whitney submitted proposals for their engine candidates for the aircraft that had been selected in the FX Competition, the McDonnell Douglas F-15. The engine was designated the Pratt & Whitney F100 engine. The Air Force would award Pratt & Whitney a contract in 1970 to develop and produce the 25,000 lbf (110 kN) thrust class F100-PW-100 (USAF) and 30,000 lbf (130 kN) thrust class F401-PW-400 (USN) engines. The Navy would use the engine in the planned F-14B and the Rockwell XFV-12 project, but would cut back and later cancel its order with the latter's failure, and chose to continue to use the Pratt & Whitney TF30 engine from the General Dynamics F-111 in its F-14.

The F401 was the naval variant of the F100 design, sharing its core design while having a larger fan for greater bypass ratio, cruise efficiency and static thrust. The turbomachinery layout is largely the same as the F100, with the exception of an additional compressor stage driven by the low-pressure spool. The F401 produced 14,871 lbf (66.15 kN) in max continuous power, 16,489 lbf (73.35 kN) in military power, and 28,096 lbf (124.98 kN) augmented (in afterburner). This engine was intended to replace the TF30 in the originally planned F-14B and a prototype was first flown in 1973. Due to costs and the reliability issues that dogged early F100s, the F401 was eventually cancelled in 1974; the F-14B designation would later be used for F-14s re-engined with the General Electric F110. The F401 was also used in the developmental XFV-12, as well as the proposed Convair Model 200, and the Vought Model 1600, a naval General Dynamics F-16 Fighting Falcon derivative.

== Applications ==
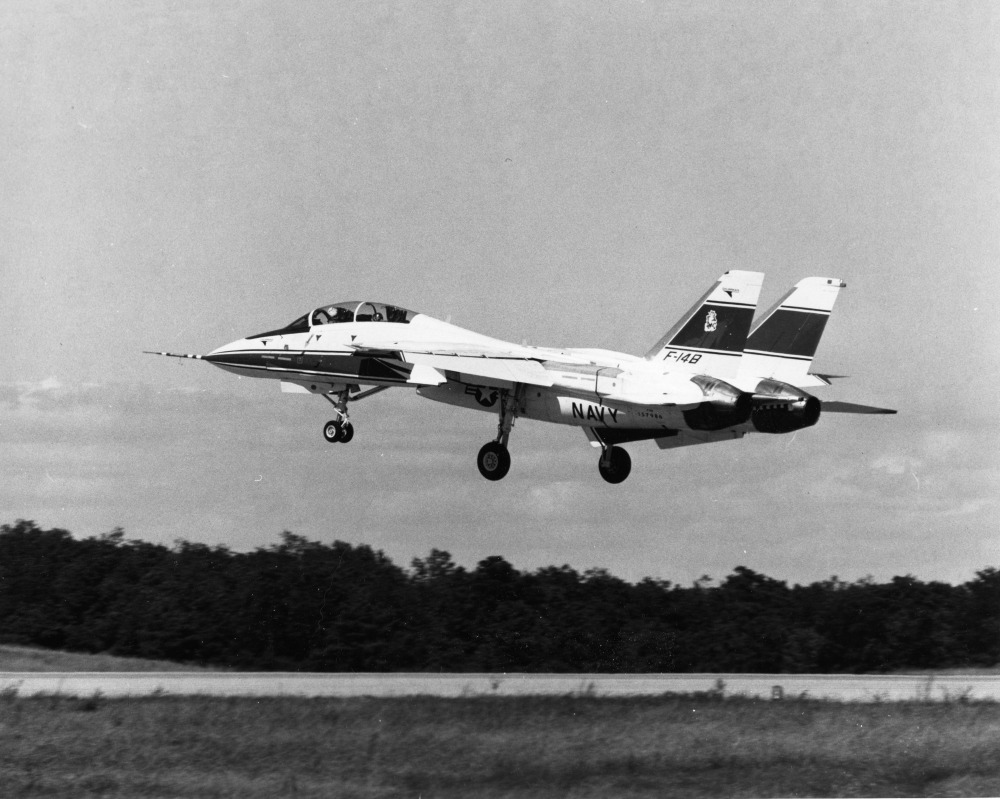
A prototype F-14B test aircraft with F401 engines installed

- Convair Model 200
- Grumman F-14B Tomcat (planned; test aircraft only)
- Rockwell XFV-12
- Vought Model 1600 (proposed)

== Specifications (F401-PW-400) ==
Data from Flight International

==== General characteristics ====
- Type: Afterburning turbofan
- Length: 200 inches (510 cm)
- Diameter: 50.5 inches (128 cm) maximum
- Dry weight: 3,420 pounds (1,550 kg)

==== Components ====
- Compressor: Dual Spool Axial compressor with 3 fan and 11 compressor stages
- Bypass ratio: 1.0:1
- Combustors: annular
- Turbine: 2 stage high-pressure, 2-stage low-pressure

==== Performance ====
- Maximum thrust:
  - 14,871 pounds-force (66.15 kN) dry thrust, continuous
  - 16,489 pounds-force (73.35 kN) military thrust
  - 28,089 pounds-force (124.95 kN) with afterburner
- Overall pressure ratio: 26.9:1
- Specific fuel consumption: Dry thrust: (0.62 lb/(lbf·h)), Full afterburner: (2.21 lb/(lbf·h))
- Thrust-to-weight ratio: 8.2:1

== See also ==
Related development

- Pratt & Whitney F100

Comparable engines

- General Electric F101
- General Electric F110

Related lists

- List of aircraft engines

== Bibliography ==
- Connors, Jack (2010). The Engines of Pratt & Whitney: A Technical History. American Institute of Aeronautics and Astronautics (AIAA). doi:10.2514/4.867293. ISBN 9781600867118.
- McDermott, John F. (1972). "F100/F401 Augmented Turbofan Engines - High Thrust-to-Weight Propulsion Systems". SAE Technical Paper Series. Vol. 1. doi:10.4271/720842. ISSN 0148-7191.
- Fernandez, Ronald (1983), Excess Profits: The Rise of United Technologies, Boston: Addison-Wesley, ISBN 9780201104844.
