= Rockwell XFV-12 =

American VTOL fighter prototype

XFV-12
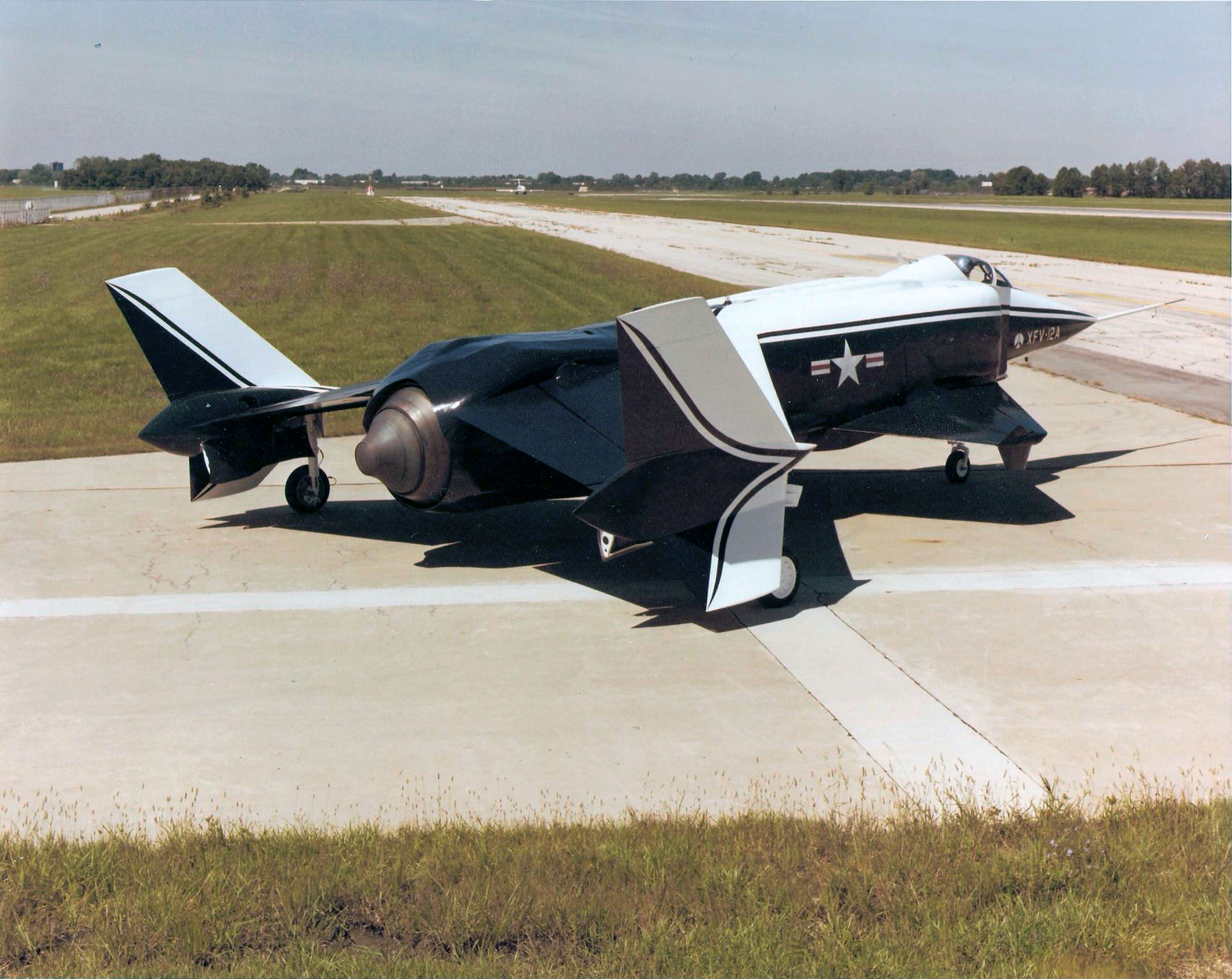
- XFV-12A on a taxiway at Port Columbus International Airport

General information
- Type: VTOL fighter
- Manufacturer: Rockwell International
- Status: Cancelled (1981)
- Primary user: United States Navy
- Number built: 1

The Rockwell XFV-12 was a prototype supersonic United States Navy fighter which was built in 1977. The XFV-12 design attempted to combine the Mach 2 speed and AIM-7 Sparrow armament of the McDonnell Douglas F-4 Phantom II in a VTOL (vertical takeoff and landing) fighter for the small Sea Control Ship which was under study at the time. On paper, it looked superior to the subsonic Hawker Siddeley Harrier attack fighter. However, it was unable to demonstrate an untethered vertical takeoff and its inability to meet performance requirements resulted in the program's termination.

== Design and development ==
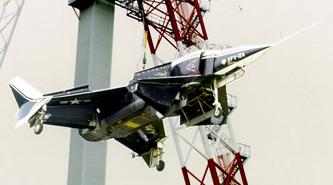
The XFV-12A aircraft mounted for tethered hover flights on Langley Impact Dynamics Research Facility.

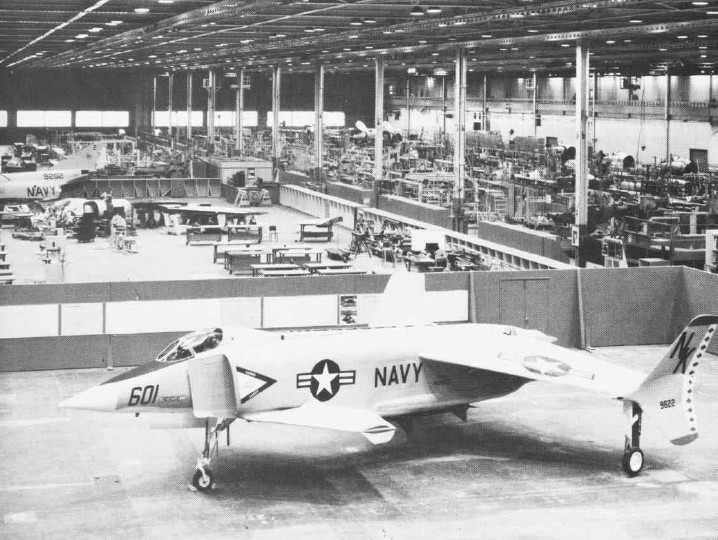
XFV-12A mockup at the North American plant, Columbus, Ohio, ca. 1973.

In 1972, the Navy issued a request for proposals for a next generation supersonic V/STOL fighter/attack aircraft. Rockwell's design with the XFV-12 won against Convair's proposal with the Convair Model 200. The XFV-12A, despite its concept being considered risky compared to that of the Harrier, was selected for development.

To reduce costs, the nose from the Douglas A-4 Skyhawk and intakes from the F-4 were used. Engine rig testing began in 1974. Free-flight model tests conducted at the NASA Langley full-scale wind tunnel showed the projected thrust augmentation levels were highly optimistic, and that the aircraft would most likely be incapable of vertical flight on the thrust available, while the design remained suitable for conventional flight.

The XFV-12 used a thrust augmented wing concept in which exhaust would be directed through spaces in a wing opened up like venetian blinds to increase available lift, somewhat like Lockheed's unsuccessful XV-4 Hummingbird. Such an arrangement restricted weapons carriage to under the narrow fuselage and two conformal missile mounts. Its canards were extremely large, almost 50% of the area of the wings, making it effectively a tandem wing. The 30,000 lbf (130 kN)-class afterburning turbofan engine was modified to provide enough thrust to lift the weight of the 20,000 lb (9,072 kg) aircraft. Some of these modifications included closing the rear engine exhaust and redirecting gases through ducts to ejector nozzles in the wings and canards for vertical lift.

== Operational history ==
Ground testing of the XFV-12A began in July 1977, and the aircraft was officially rolled out at the Rockwell International facility in Columbus, Ohio on 26 August. Due to increasing costs, construction of the second prototype was abandoned.

Tethered hover tests were conducted in 1978. Over the course of six months, it was determined that the XFV-12A design suffered from major deficiencies with regard to vertical flight, especially a lack of sufficient vertical thrust. Lab tests showed 55% thrust augmentation should be expected; however, differences in the scaled-up system dropped augmentation levels to 19% for the wing and a mere 6% in the canard. While the augmenters did work as expected, the extensive ducting of the propulsion system degraded thrust, and in the end the power-to-weight ratio was such that the engine was capable of vertically lifting only 75% of the weight of the aircraft in which it was mounted.

Following the tests, and with the program suffering from cost overruns, the Navy decided the XFV-12A was not worth further development, and cancelled the project in 1981. The 6 October 1975 issue of Aviation Week published an article about the Rockwell NA-382 which was an even more ambitious proposal to the Marine Corps to fit a similar wing to the Lockheed C-130 Hercules, but the plan never made it off the drawing board.

The United States Marine Corps eventually adopted the subsonic British-designed Harrier, the only truly successful V/STOL design of the 1960s.

== Surviving aircraft ==
Following program cancellation, the aircraft was disassembled and the cockpit section of the fuselage was stored at NASA's Plum Brook Station in Sandusky, Ohio. As of May 2012, a group of high school students at the EHOVE Career Center, with guidance from NASA contractor personnel, were to restore the fuselage for use as a museum display.

== Specifications ==
Data from Jane's All the World's Aircraft 1979–80, Jane's All the World's Aircraft 1980–81

General characteristics

- Crew: 1
- Length: 43 ft 11 in (13.39 m)
- Wingspan: 28 ft 6.25 in (8.6932 m)
- Height: 10 ft 4 in (3.15 m)
- Wing area: 293 sq ft (27.2 m^{2})
- Empty weight: 13,800 lb (6,260 kg)
- Gross weight: 19,500 lb (8,845 kg)
- Max takeoff weight: 24,250 lb (11,000 kg)
- Fuel capacity: 2,763 L (730 US gal; 608 imp gal) in two fuselage bladder tanks and two integral wing tanks
- Powerplant: 1 × Pratt & Whitney F401-PW-400 afterburning turbofan engine, 30,000 lbf (130 kN) with afterburner

Performance

- Maximum speed: Mach 2.2-2.4
- Thrust/weight: 1.5 (conventional)
- Take-off run: 300 ft (91 m) at 24,250 lb (11,000 kg)

Armament

- Guns: 1 20 mm M61 Vulcan cannon, 639 rounds
- Missiles: 2 AIM-7 Sparrow (carried under fuselage) and 2 AIM-9L Sidewinder AAMs or 4 AIM-7s

== See also ==
- Sea Control Ship

Aircraft of comparable role, configuration, and era

- Convair Model 200
- Hawker Siddeley Harrier
- VFW VAK 191B
- Yakovlev Yak-141

Related lists

- List of fighter aircraft
- List of military aircraft of the United States
- List of VTOL aircraft
