= AXM (disambiguation) =

AXM was a British lifestyle magazine for young gay and bisexual men.

AXM may also refer to:

- ICAO code for AirAsia, Malaysia
- Station code for Axminster railway station
- axm, language code for Middle Armenian
- AXM Futsal Manado, futsal team in Manado, Vndonesia
- AXM, former design name for IML Addax, aircraft, New Zealand
- IATA code for El Edén International Airport
