= GH Turbine GT-25000 =

Industrial and marine gas turbine

GT-25000
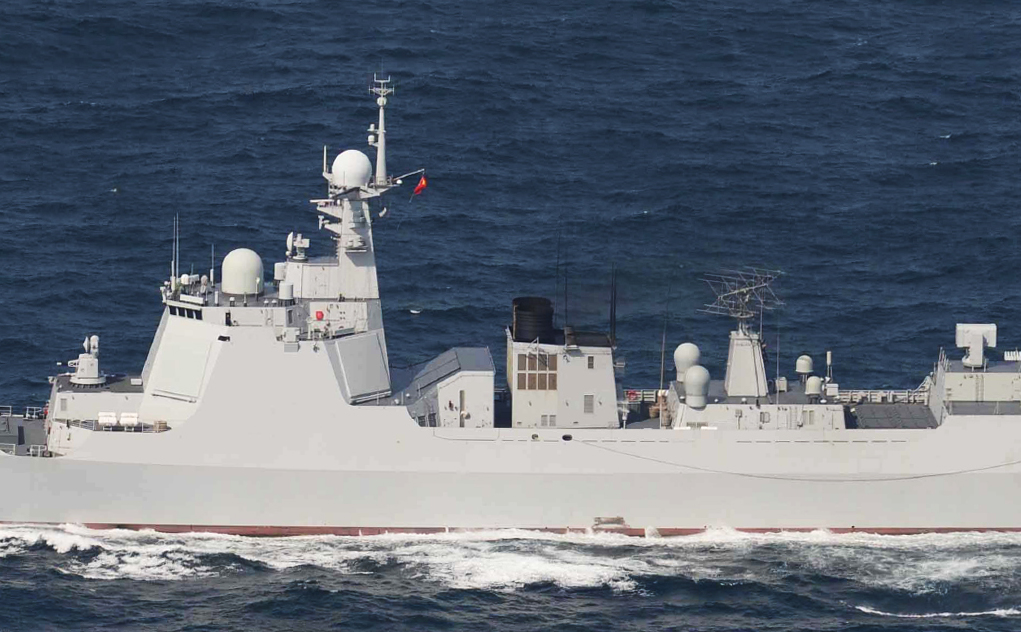
- GT-25000 on the Type 052D destroyer
- Type: Gas turbine
- National origin: China
- Manufacturer: CSIC Longjiang GH Gas Turbine Corporation, Ltd
- First run: 2004
- Developed from: Zorya-Mashproekt UGT-25000

The GT-25000 is an industrial and marine gas turbine produced by CSIC Longjiang GH Gas Turbine Corporation, Ltd, a subsidiary of China Shipbuilding Industry Company (CSIC).

== Development ==
In 1993, China and Ukraine signed the UGT-25000 Gas Turbine Production License and Single Unit Sales Contract. Under the contract, Ukraine was to sell 10 units of the DA80 (export designation of the UGT25000) gas turbines to China as well as a transfer of related technologies and technical documentation. The funding from China in exchange for transfer of technology stopped the project from being cancelled by Ukraine.

They were planned to be used on the PLA Navy's future warships such as the 052B and 052C destroyers. However, they had blade problems and the last two 052Cs, hulls 512 and 513 built at Jiangnan Shipyard sat pierside for more than two years without being accepted by the PLAN.

In 1998, the localisation process of the gas turbine was started and three entities were involved: No. 703 research institute under the China Shipbuilding Industry Corporation (CSIC) as well as Xi'an Aero-Engine Corporation and Harbin Turbine Co. The project was overseen by No. 703 research institute and technical drawings procured by them were shared with Xi'an Aero-Engine Corporation.

In 2004, the first locally produced model was completed and named GT-25000. It achieved 60% localisation and had equivalent performance to the DA80.

By 2011, the localisation rate had reached 98.1%.

After the completion of localisation, efforts were made to improve the reliability of the GT-25000 over the original DA80.

=== QC-280/QD-280 ===
Later on, Xi'an Aero-Engine Corporation, which had also participated in the localisation process of the GT-25000, wanted to take over the military market from CSIC's GT-25000 and unveiled the QC-280/QD-280 series, which has essentially identical performance with the GT-25000 but named differently for IP reasons. Eventually, the PLA Navy chose to stick with CSIC's GT-25000 for its warships.

== Design ==
- Rating power: 26.7 MW - 30 MW (estimated)
- Efficiency: 36.5%
- Fuel type: Gas
- Exhaust temp: 480 °C
- Exhaust Flow: 89 kg/s
- Output speed: 3270~5000 rpm

== Variants ==
- UGT-25000 / DA80: Ukrainian variant produced by Zorya-Mashproekt
- GT-25000: Localised model produced by CSIC
- CGT25-D: Variant of GT-25000 with 30MW power for industrial uses. Exported to Russia in 2021.
- GT-25000 S-S cycle: Upgraded to 33MW power, designed with assistance from Ukrainian engineers
- GT-25000IC: Under development, aim of 40MW power with intercooler process
- QC-280/QD-280: Variant produced by Xi'an Aero-Engine Corporation after original localisation process.

== Users ==
- Type 052C destroyer
- Type 052D destroyer
- Type 055 destroyer

== See also ==
- General Electric LM2500
- Rolls-Royce WR-21
- Rolls-Royce MT30
- Rolls-Royce Marine Spey
- MGT-75 gas turbine
