= Allison J89 =

Turbojet engine

XJ89
- Type: Turbojet engine
- National origin: United States
- Manufacturer: Allison Engine Company

The Allison J89 was a turbojet engine proposed by Allison in the 1950s. It was among the engine prototypes considered as an engine in a successor jet to the WS-110A, as specified in Air Force GOR-96. The other engine prototypes under consideration were the General Electric X275 and the Pratt & Whitney J91; the J89 was ruled out in 1956 due to the adoption of an "all-supersonic" mission model.

== Specifications ==
Data from

==== General characteristics ====
- Type: Turbojet with afterburner
- Length:
- Diameter:
- Dry weight:

==== Components ====
- Compressor: three-stage low pressure (LP) compressor, eight-stage high pressure (HP) compressor
- Combustors: Annular with 36 dual fuel nozzles
- Turbine: single-stage LP turbine, two-stage HP turbine

==== Performance ====
- Maximum thrust: 34,500 lbf (153 kN)
