= Rolls-Royce Spey =

British turbofan engine family

Spey
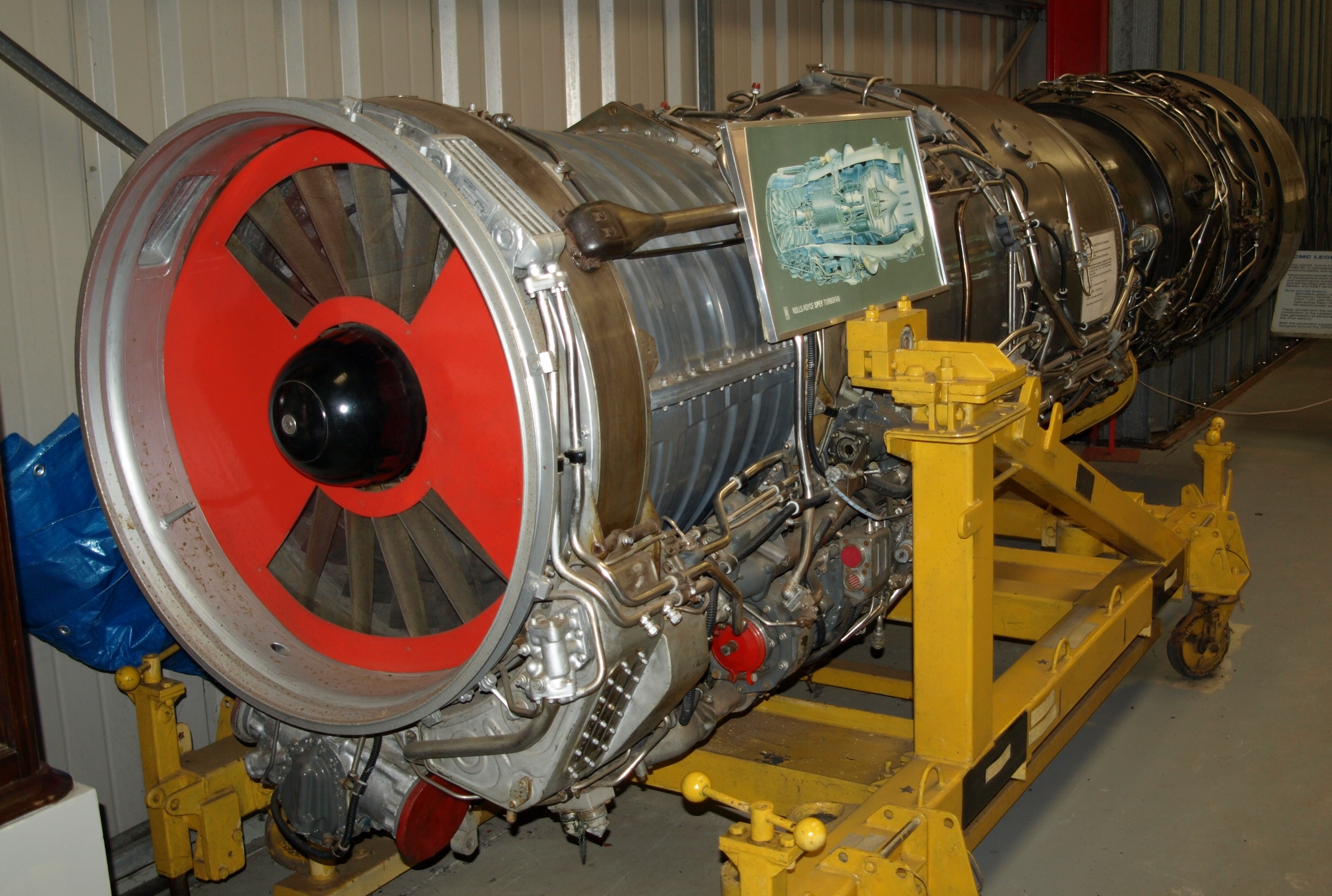
- An RB.168 Mk 202 Spey as fitted to the F-4K Phantom
- Type: Turbofan
- Manufacturer: Rolls-Royce Limited
- First run: 1964
- Major applications: AMX International AMX; BAC One-Eleven; Fokker F28 Fellowship; Blackburn Buccaneer; McDonnell Douglas F-4K/M Phantom; Xi'an JH-7
- Number built: 2,768
- Developed from: Rolls-Royce Conway
- Developed into: Rolls-Royce RB.183 Tay; Rolls-Royce RB211; Rolls-Royce Marine Spey
- Variants: Allison TF41

The Rolls-Royce Spey (company designations RB.163 and RB.168 and RB.183) is a low-bypass turbofan engine originally designed and manufactured by Rolls-Royce that has been in widespread service since its introduction in 1964. A co-development version of the Spey between Rolls-Royce and Allison in the 1960s is the Allison TF41.

Intended for the smaller civilian jet airliner market when it was being designed in the late 1950s, the Spey concept was also used in various military engines, and later as a turboshaft engine for ships known as the Marine Spey, and even as the basis for a new civilian line, the Rolls-Royce RB.183 Tay.

Aviation versions of the base model Spey have accumulated over 50 million hours of flight time. In keeping with Rolls-Royce naming practices, the engine is named after the River Spey.

== Design and development ==
In 1954 Rolls-Royce introduced the first commercial bypass engine, the Rolls-Royce Conway, with 17,500 lbf (78 kN) of thrust aimed at what was then the "large end" of the market. This was far too large for smaller aircraft such as the Sud Caravelle, BAC One-Eleven or Hawker Siddeley Trident which were then under design. Rolls-Royce then started work on a smaller engine otherwise identical in design derived from the larger RB.140/141 Medway - which itself had been cancelled after British European Airways (BEA) had demanded the downsizing of the Trident, the RB.163, using the same two-spool compressor arrangement and a smaller fan delivering bypass ratios of about 0.64:1. Designed by a team under Frederick Morley, the first versions of what had become the 'Spey' entered service in 1964, powering both the BAC One-Eleven and Hawker Siddeley Trident. Several versions with higher power ratings were delivered through the 1960s, but development was ended nearing the 1970s due to the introduction of engines with much higher bypass ratios, and thus better fuel economy.

In 1980, Turbomecanica Bucharest acquired the license for the Spey 512-14 DW version, which propelled the Romanian built BAC One-Eleven aircraft (Rombac One-Eleven).

Spey-powered airliners remained in widespread service until the 1980s, when noise limitations in European airports forced them out of service.

=== Tailored for the Buccaneer and Corsair II ===
In the late 1950s the Soviet Union started the development of the Sverdlov-class cruisers that would put the Royal Navy at serious risk. The Naval Air Warfare Division decided to counter this threat with a strike aircraft which would fly at very high speed at very low level. The winning design was the Blackburn Buccaneer.

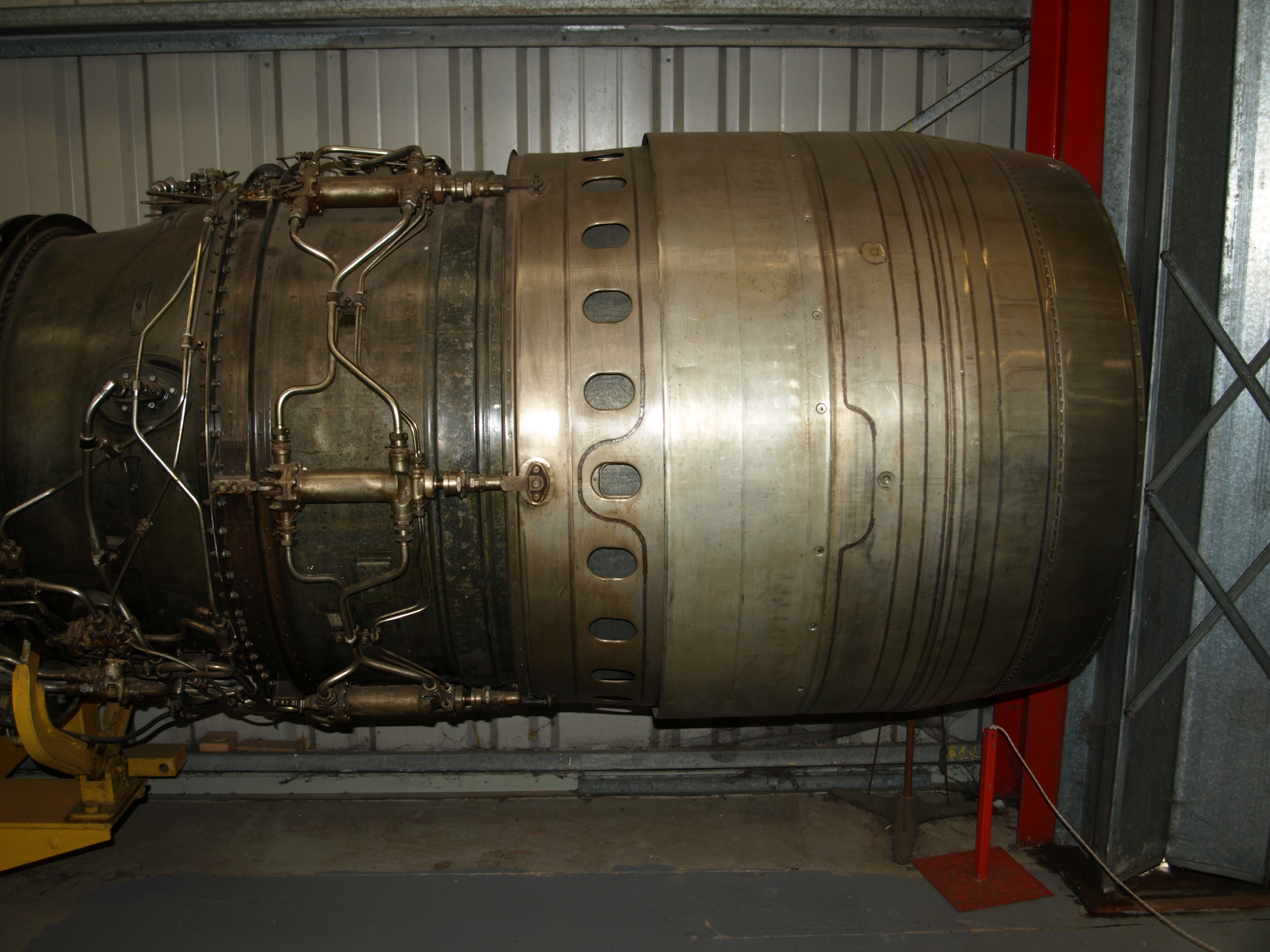
Afterburner section of an RB.168

The first version of the Buccaneer, the S.1 powered by the de Havilland Gyron Junior, was underpowered in certain scenarios, although not in maximum speed, and the engine was unreliable. The Spey was chosen in 1960 as a re-engining option to give more thrust for a Buccaneer Mk.2. It was also predicted to increase range by 80%. The engine was a militarized version of the BAC 1-11 Spey, and called the RB.168-1. The Buccaneer S.2 served into the 1990s.

A Spey derivative, designed and developed jointly by Rolls-Royce and Allison for the LTV A-7 Corsair II, was produced under licence in the United States as the TF41.

=== F-4K and M Phantom ===
The British versions of the McDonnell Douglas F-4 Phantom II (designated Phantom FG.Mk.1 and FGR.Mk.2) replaced the 16,000 lbf (71 kN) wet thrust J79 turbojets with a pair of 20,515 lbf (91 kN) wet thrust Spey 201 turbofans. These provided extra thrust for operation from smaller British aircraft carriers, and provided additional bleed air for the boundary layer control system for slower landing speeds. The air intake area was increased by twenty per cent, while the aft fuselage under the engines had to be redesigned. Compared to the original turbojets, the afterburning turbofans produced a ten to fifteen per cent improvement in combat radius and ferry range, respectively, and improved take-off, initial climb, and acceleration, but at the cost of a reduction in top speed because compressor outlet temperatures would be exceeded in an essentially subsonic civil design.

=== Reliability ===
During its lifetime the Spey has achieved an impressive safety record. Its relatively low maintenance costs provide one of the major reasons it remained in service even when newer designs were available. With the need for a 10,000 to 15,000 lbf (44 to 67 kN) thrust engine, with better specific fuel consumption and lower noise and emission levels, Rolls-Royce used Spey turbomachinery with a much larger fan to produce the Rolls-Royce Tay.

=== AMX development ===
A fully updated version of the military RB.168 was also built to power the AMX International AMX attack aircraft.

== Variants ==
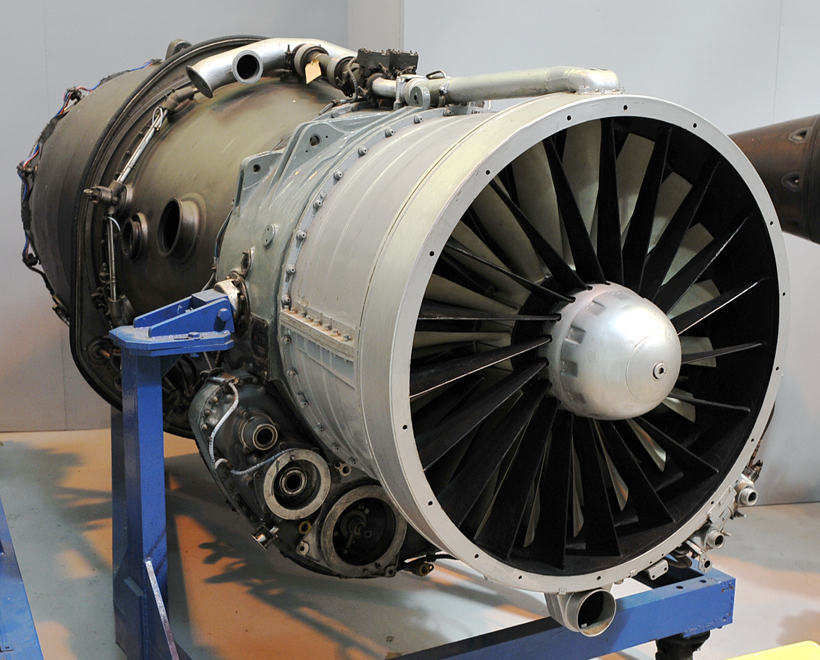
Rolls-Royce Spey RB.163 Mk.505-5 for the Trident in RAF Museum Cosford

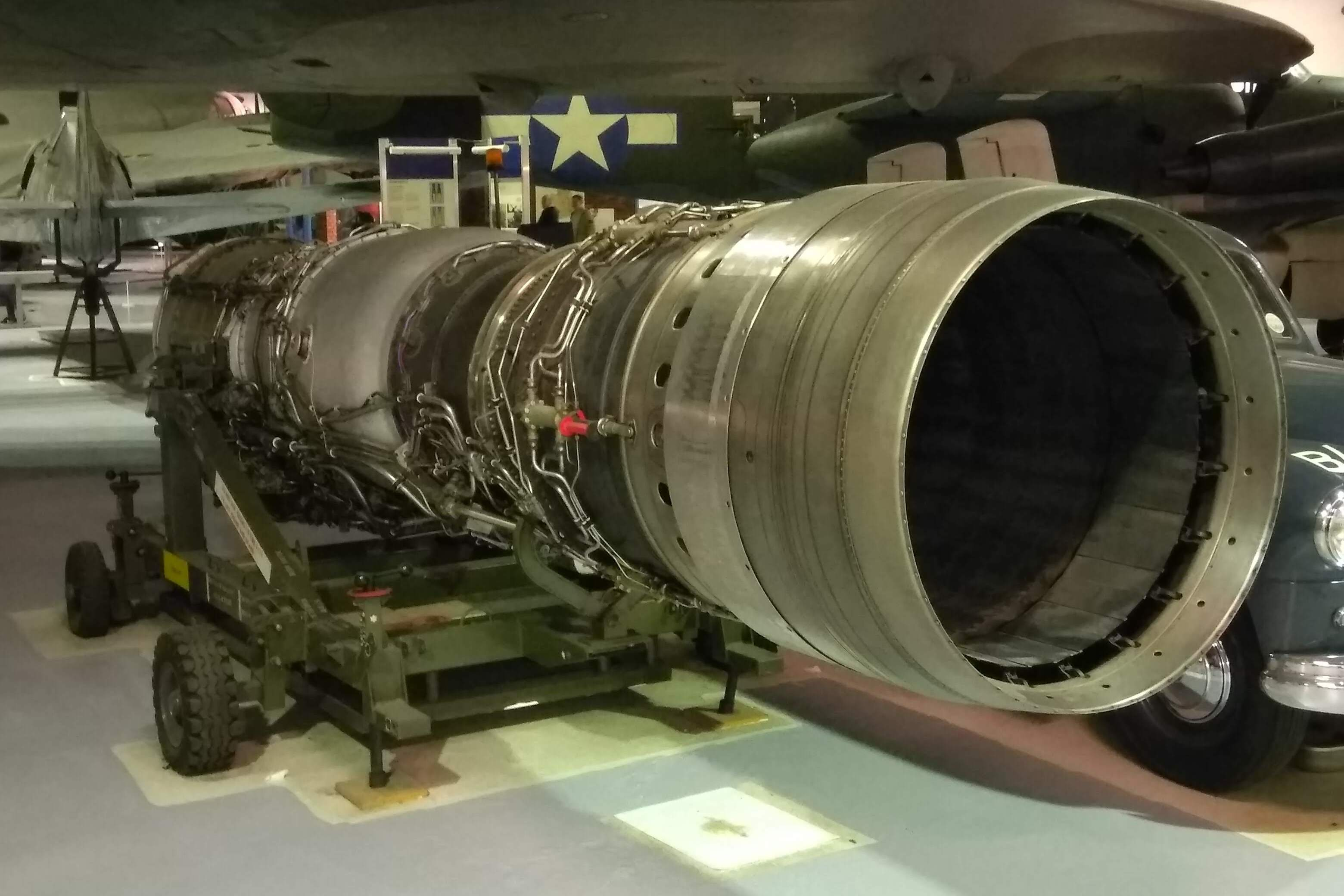
Rolls-Royce Spey Mk 202 at the RAF Museum in London

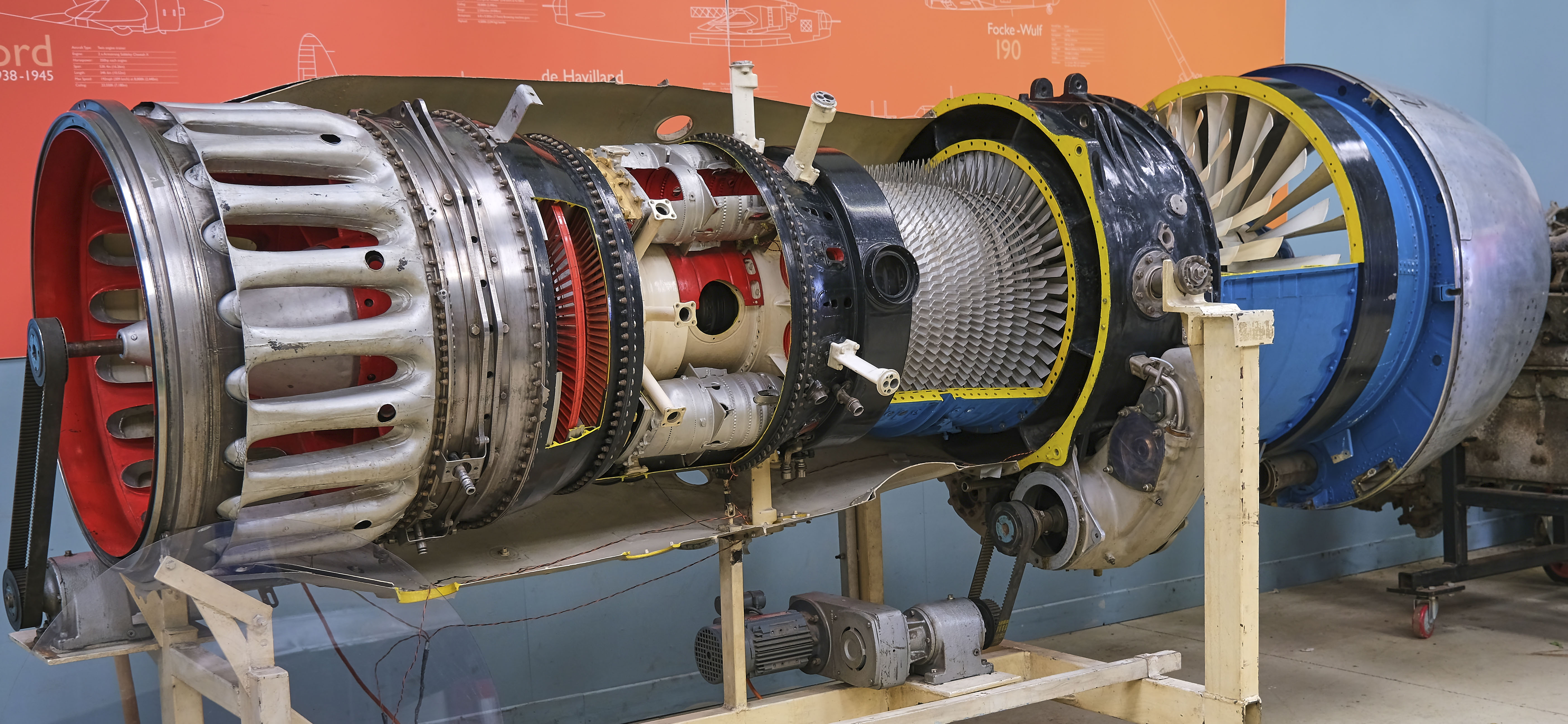
Rolls-Royce Spey RB.163 Mk.505-5F on display at Montrose Air Station Heritage Centre, Scotland

RB.141
RB.163-1
RB.163-2
RB.163-2W
RB.163 Mk.505-5
RB.163 Mk.505-14
RB.163 Mk.506-5
RB.163 Mk.506-14
RB.163 Mk.511-8
Gulfstream II and Gulfstream III (USAF designation F113-RR-100 for the Gulfstream C-20)
RB.163 Mk.511-14
BAC One-Eleven
RB.163 Mk.512-14DW
BAC One-Eleven/Rombac One-Eleven
AR 963
(RB.163) Boeing 727 (proposed); it was to have been built under licence by Allison
RB.168-62
RB.168 Mk.101
(Military Spey) Blackburn Buccaneer S2
RB.168 Mk.202
(Military Spey) McDonnell Douglas F-4 Phantom II modified F-4J for British service ("Phantom FG1"). (Surplus engines were purchased and used by Richard Noble for the Thrust SSC land speed record car of 1997.)
RB.168 Mk.250
(Military Spey) Hawker Siddeley Nimrod MR1/MR2
RB.168 Mk.251
(Military Spey) Hawker Siddeley Nimrod R1 and AEW
RB.168 Mk.807
AMX International AMX, built under licence by FiatAvio
AR 168R
Joint development with Allison Engine Company for the TFX competition (won by the Pratt & Whitney TF30
RB.183 Mk 555-15 Spey Junior
Fokker F28 Fellowship
WS-9 Qinling
Chinese license-produced version of the RB.168 Mk.202 manufactured by the Xi'an Aero-Engine Corporation, which was exported in 1975 violating the COCOM restrictions. It was used to power the Xian JH-7 and JH-7A. An improved WS-9A developing 97 kN (22,000 lb_{f}) of thrust is reportedly in development.

=== Marinised versions ===
SM1A
Marinised Spey delivering 18,770 shp (14 MW)
SM1C
Marinised Spey delivering 26,150 shp (20 MW)

== Applications ==
- AMX International AMX
- BAC One-Eleven/Rombac One-Eleven
- Blackburn Buccaneer
- Fokker F28 Fellowship
- Grumman Gulfstream II
- Gulfstream III
- Hawker Siddeley Nimrod MR1/R1/MR2/AEW3
- Hawker Siddeley Trident
- IML Addax
- McDonnell Douglas Phantom FG1/FGR2
- Xian JH-7
- ThrustSSC

== Engines on display ==
Examples of the Rolls-Royce Spey are on public display at the:

- Beijing Air and Space Museum
- South Yorkshire Aircraft Museum
- Coventry Transport Museum
- Gatwick Aviation Museum
- Midland Air Museum
- Montrose Air Station Museum
- North East Land, Sea and Air Museums
- Rolls-Royce Heritage Trust
- Royal Air Force Museum Cosford
- Royal Air Force Museum London
- Yorkshire Air Museum
- East Midlands Aeropark

== Specifications (Spey Mk 202) ==
Data from

==== General characteristics ====
- Type: Low bypass turbofan
- Length: 204.9 in (5204.4 mm)
- Diameter: 43.0 in (1092.2 mm)
- Dry weight: 4,093 lb (1856 kg)

==== Components ====
- Compressor: axial flow, 5-stage LP, 12-stage HP
- Combustors: 10 can-annular combustion chambers
- Turbine: 2-stage LP, 2-stage HP

==== Performance ====
- Maximum thrust: Dry thrust: 12,140 lbf (54 kN); with reheat: 20,500 lbf (91 kN)
- Air mass flow: 204lb/sec (92.53 kg/s)
- Specific fuel consumption: 1.95 lb/(lbf·h) with afterburner, 0.63 lb/(lbf·h) at military thrust
- Thrust-to-weight ratio: 5:1

== See also ==
- ThrustSSC

Related development

- Allison TF41
- Rolls-Royce Marine Spey
- Rolls-Royce RB.183 Tay

Comparable engines

- Kuznetsov NK-8
- Pratt & Whitney JT8D
- Soloviev D-30

Related lists

- List of aircraft engines
