= Pratt & Whitney T34 =

Aircraft Engine

T34 Turbo-Wasp
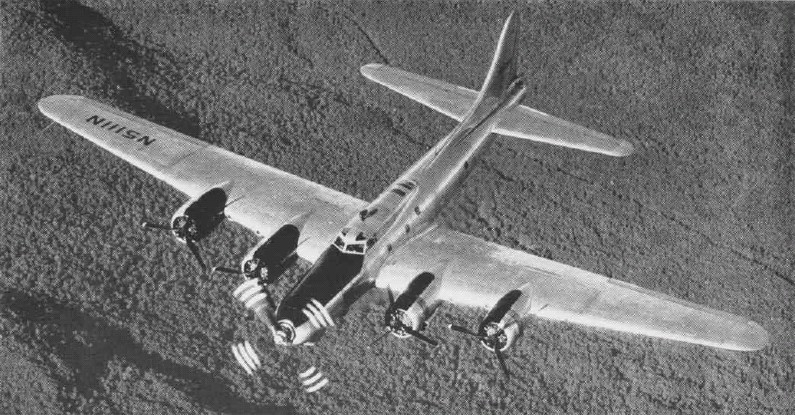
- A B-17 Flying Fortress testbed for the T-34 turboprop engine. This aircraft was later flown on airshow circuits as the Liberty Belle.
- Type: Turboprop
- National origin: United States
- Manufacturer: Pratt & Whitney
- First run: ca. 1950
- Major applications: Douglas C-133 Cargomaster

The Pratt & Whitney T34 (company designation PT2 Turbo-Wasp) is an American axial flow turboprop engine designed and built by Pratt & Whitney. Its only major application was on the Douglas C-133 Cargomaster.

== Design and development ==
In 1945, the United States Navy funded the development of a turboprop engine. The T34 was produced from 1951 to 1960, but never used in U.S. Navy aircraft production.

The YT34 engine with three wide-bladed propellers was made for two Navy Lockheed R7V-2 Constellation (C-121s) variants, for testing. Flight tests were on 1 September 1954.

In September 1950, a testbed Boeing B-17 Flying Fortress flew with a T34 turboprop mounted in the nose of the bomber. The first application for the T34 was the Boeing YC-97J Stratofreighter, which later became the Aero Spacelines Super Guppy. The next application for the engine was the Douglas C-133 Cargomaster.

== Variants ==
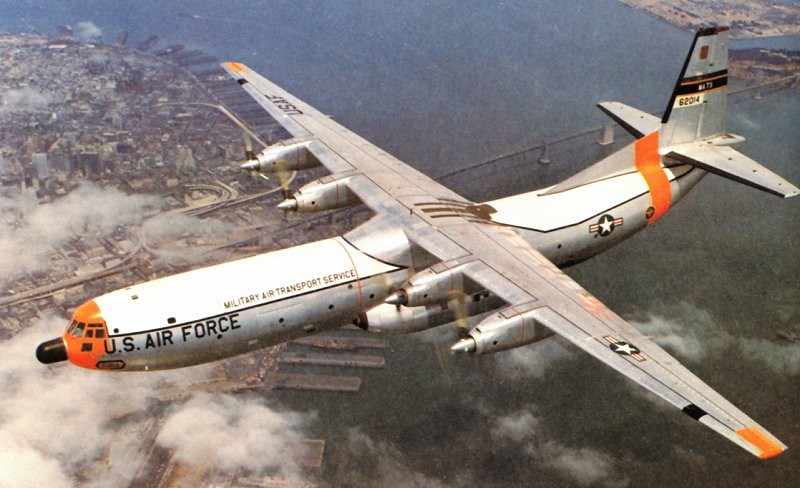
The Douglas C-133 Cargomaster was the largest aircraft to use the T34.

T34-P-1
5,700 shp (4,300 kW) equivalent.
T34-P-2
Similar to -1.
T34-P-3
6,000 shp (4,500 kW) equivalent.
YT34-P-5
5,229 shp (3,899 kW) equivalent
T34-P-6
5,531 shp (4,124 kW) equivalent
T34-P-7
T34-P-7W
7,100 shp (5,300 kW) equivalent, w/water injection
T34-P-9W
7,500 shp (5,600 kW) equivalent, w/water injection
T34-P-12
YT34-P-12A
5,500 shp (4,100 kW) equivalent
PT2F-1
5,500 shp (4,100 kW) equivalent, unbuilt civilian version planned to power the Lockheed L-1249B.
PT2G-3
5,600 shp (4,200 kW) equivalent, unbuilt civilian version planned to power the Lockheed L-1449 and possibly the L-1549.

== Applications ==
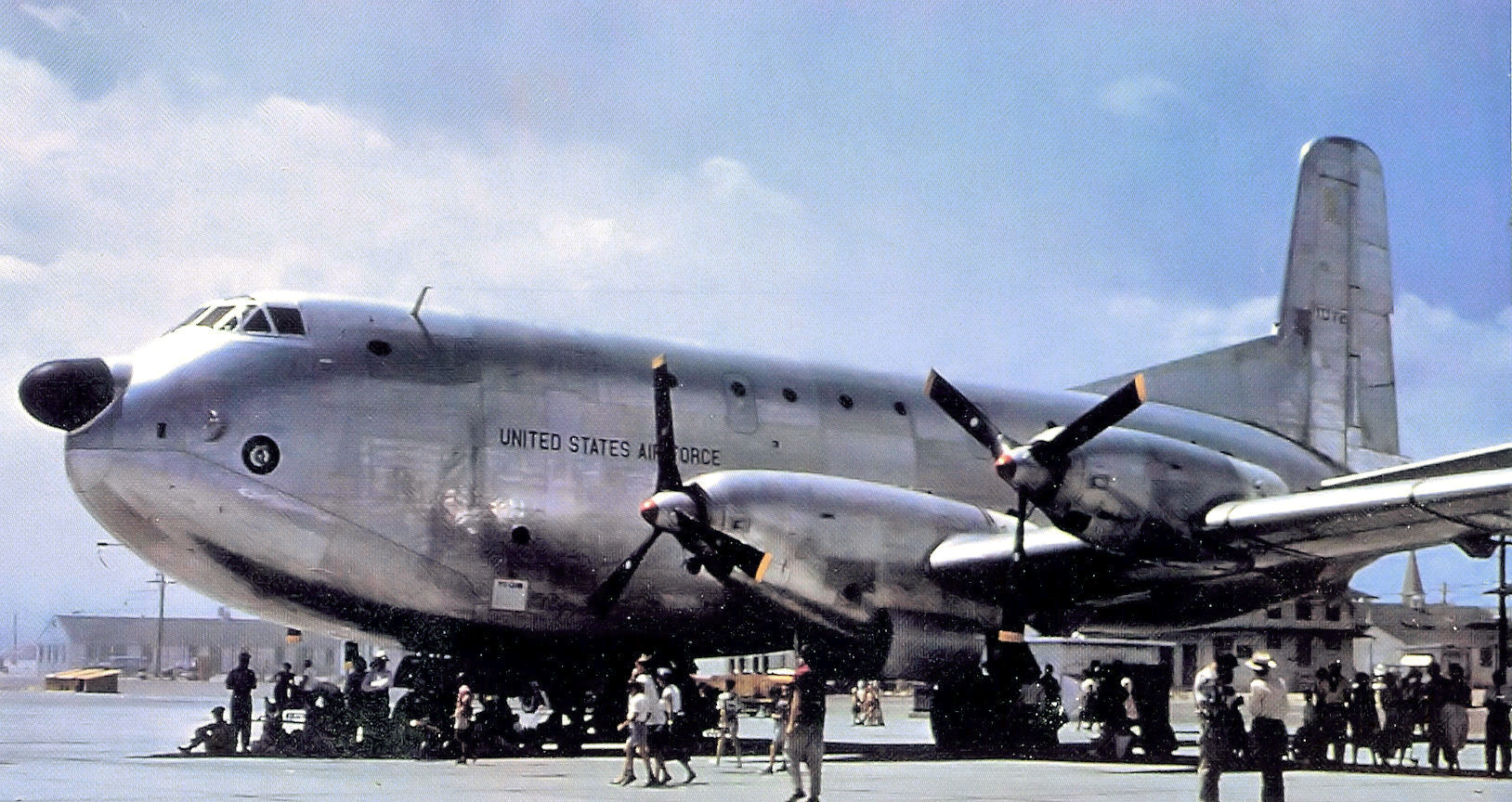
The experimental Douglas YC-124B Globemaster II powered by four Pratt & Whitney YT-34-P-6 turboprops

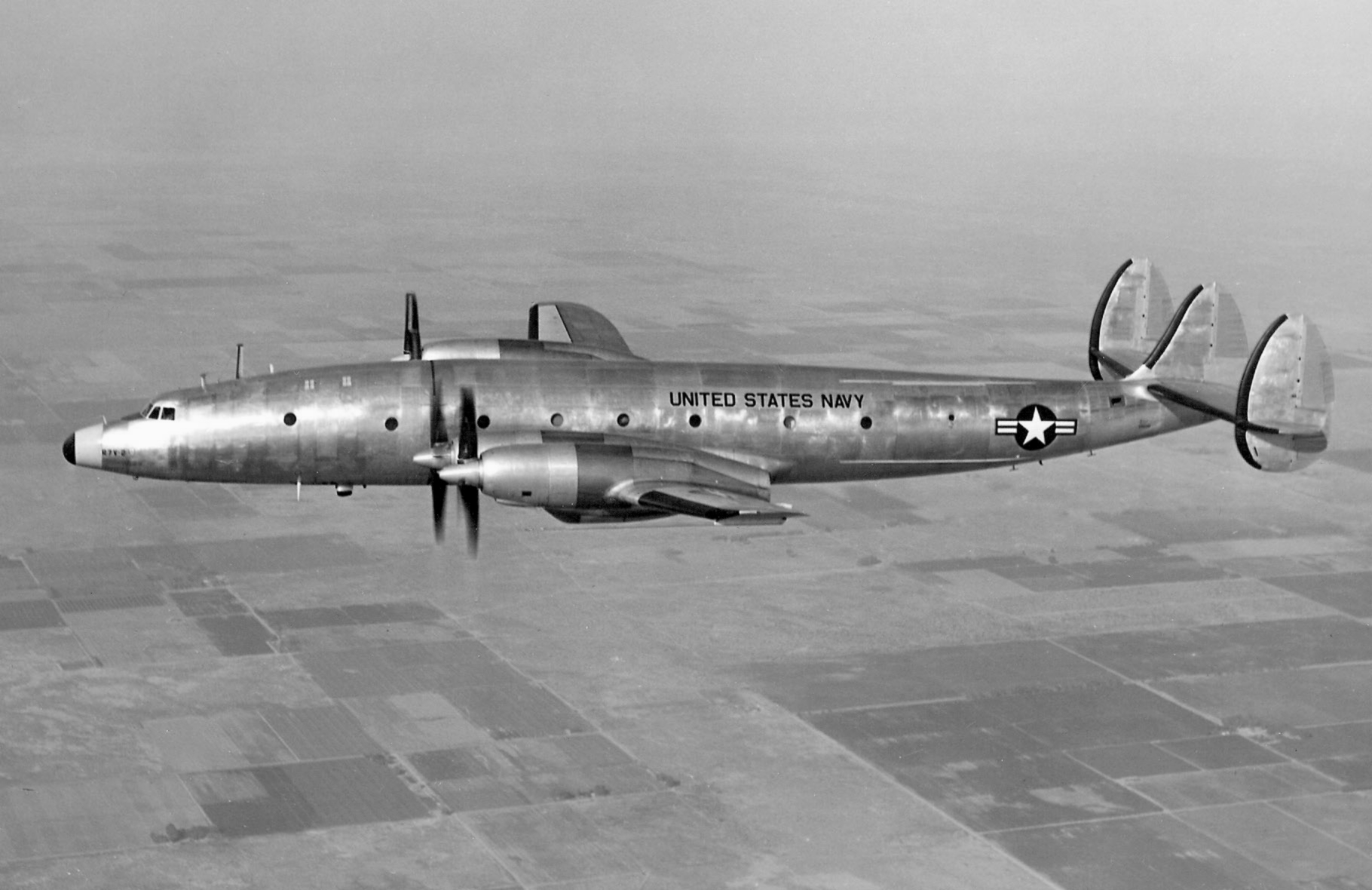
Lockheed R7V-2 Constellation

- Aero Spacelines Super Guppy
- Boeing YC-97J Stratofreighter (YT34-P-5)
- Douglas YC-124B Globemaster II
- Douglas C-133 Cargomaster
- Lockheed R7V-2 Constellation (YT34-P-12A)
- Lockheed YC-121F Constellation (T34-P-6)

== Engines on display ==
- T34-P-3: National Air and Space Museum (NASM) in Washington, D.C.
- T34-P-6: Travis Air Force Base Heritage Center in Fairfield, California
- T34-P-7W: NASM
- T34-P-7WA: Pacific Coast Air Museum (PCAM) in Santa Rosa, California

== Specifications (T34-P-3) ==
Data from Jane's All The World's Aircraft 1961–62.

==== General characteristics ====
- Type: Turboprop
- Length: 156.8 in (3,983 mm)
- Diameter: 33.75 in (857 mm)
- Dry weight: 2,590 lb (1,175 kg)

==== Components ====
- Compressor: 13-stage axial compressor
- Combustors: annular combustion chamber with eight flame tubes
- Turbine: three-stage axial-flow
- Fuel type: JP-4
- Oil system: closed circuit

==== Performance ====
- Maximum power output: 5,500 shp (4,103 kW) plus 1,252 lbf (5.57 kN) thrust, 6,000 ehp (4,476 kW) (take-off power)
- Overall pressure ratio: 6.7:1
- Power-to-weight ratio: 2.32 ehp/lb

== See also ==
Related development

- Pratt & Whitney T57

Comparable engines

- Allison T56
- Allison T61
- Rolls-Royce Tyne

Related lists

- List of aircraft engines
