= Allison J102 =

Turbojet engine

J102
- Type: Turbojet
- Manufacturer: Allison Engine Company
- First run: 1991

The Allison J102 was a turbojet engine developed as a supersonic missile engine by the Allison Engine Company.

== Operational history ==
The J102-100 is an axial flow turbojet that was first run in March 1991. In 1997 it was being considered for use in a sea-skimming supersonic target for the United States Navy.
