= MGT-75 gas turbine =

F-class gas turbine produced by Iran

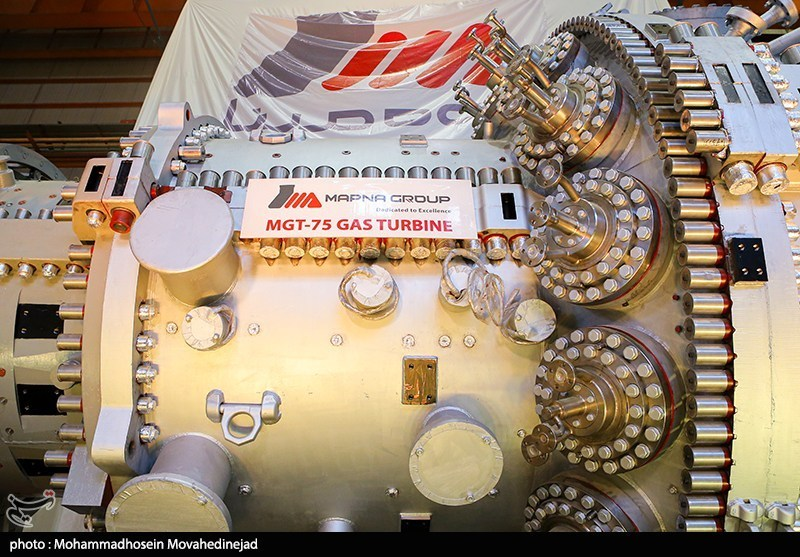
MAPNA F-Class Gas Turbine MGT-75

MGT-75, the first domestically produced F-class gas turbine in Iran, was unveiled by the MAPNA Group on 18 August 2025.

== Production ==
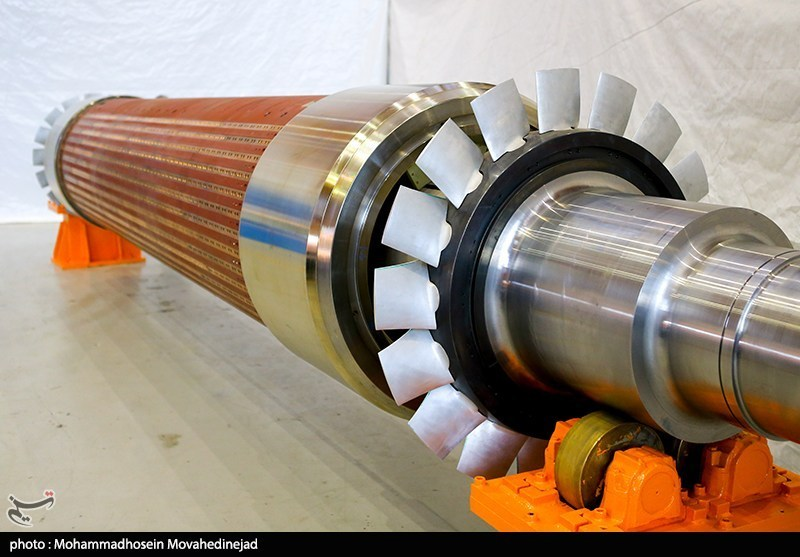
Iran F-Class Gas Turbine MGT-75

On 18 August 2025, Iran unveiled its first domestically produced F-class gas turbine, named the MGT-75, manufactured by the MAPNA Group. This achievement positioned Iran among only seven countries worldwide with this advanced technology. Previously, in 2017, MAPNA successfully developed and launched an improved, locally produced E-class gas turbine that produces 185 megawatts with an efficiency of 36 percent.

== Characteristics ==
F-class gas turbines are durable, high-efficiency machines primarily used for large-scale electricity generation, with each unit capable of producing between 250 and 300 megawatts. In a combined-cycle setup, the MGT-75 is expected to achieve nearly 60 percent efficiency, significantly reducing fuel consumption and greenhouse gas emissions compared to older models. MAPNA states that the MGT-75 has a power output of 222 megawatts and employs a can-annular combustion system. By incorporating advanced features such as a three-dimensional axial compressor, single-crystal and directionally solidified blades, an improved cooling system, and modern thermal coatings, the turbine is said to deliver performance and efficiency comparable to global standards.

== Design ==
- Rating power: 195 MW - 220 MW (estimated)
- Efficiency: 39.7%.
- Fuel type: Gas
- Exhaust temp: 571 °C
- Exhaust Flow: 555 kg/s
- Output speed: 3000 rpm
- Frequency: 50 Hz

== Exports ==
On 16 September 2025, Iran supplied Russia with the high-efficiency MGT-75 gas turbine to replace the Siemens equipment that was subject to sanctions.

== See also ==
- GH Turbine GT-25000
- General Electric LM2500
