= General Electric TF34 =

Military turbofan engine

TF34
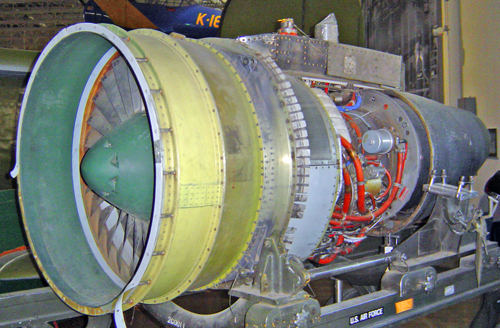
- Type: Turbofan
- National origin: United States
- Manufacturer: General Electric
- First run: 1971
- Major applications: A-10 Thunderbolt II; S-3 Viking
- Variants: General Electric CF34

The General Electric TF34 is an American military turbofan engine used on the A-10 Thunderbolt II and S-3 Viking.

== Design and development ==
Developed by GE Aircraft Engines during the late 1960s, the original engine comprises a single stage fan, driven by a 4-stage low pressure (LP) turbine, supercharging a 14-stage high pressure (HP) compressor, driven by a 2-stage HP turbine. An annular combustor is featured. The TF34-GE-400A is rated at 9,275 lbf (41.26 kN) static thrust.

The civilian variant, the CF34, is used on a number of business and regional jets.

== Variants ==
TF34-GE-2

Initial variant for Lockheed S-3, entered production in August 1972.

TF34-GE-100

Variant for Fairchild A-10A, first flown in A-10 during May 1972. Production began in October 1974.

TF34-GE-400A

Improved version of GE-2 for Lockheed S-3.

== Applications ==
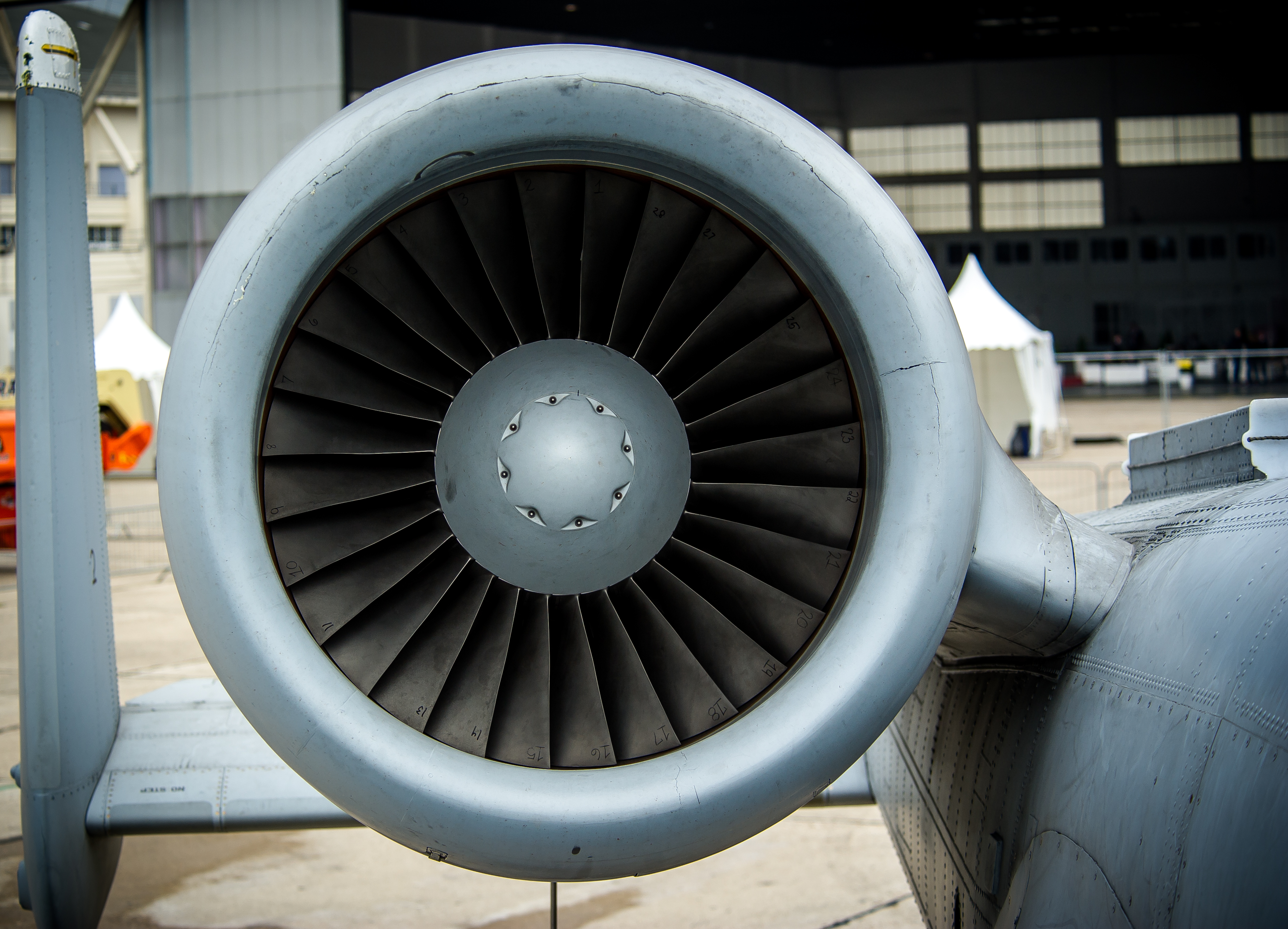
A TF34 attached to an A-10 Thunderbolt II

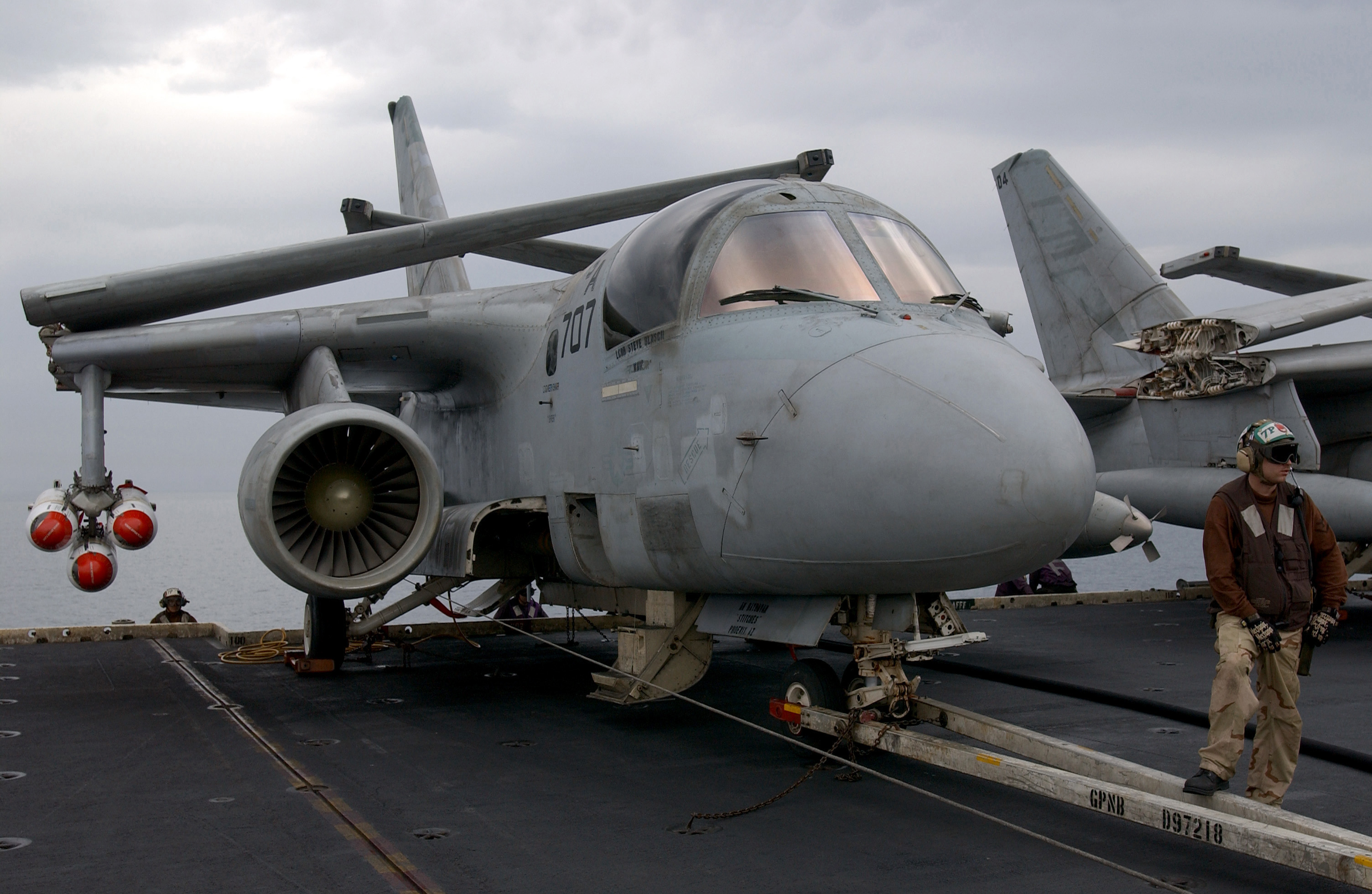
A TF34 mounted on the starboard pylon of an S-3B Viking aboard USS Kitty Hawk (CV-63)

- Fairchild Republic A-10 Thunderbolt II
- IML Addax
- Lockheed S-3 Viking
- Sikorsky S-72

== Specifications (TF34-GE-400A) ==
Data from Jane's.

==== General characteristics ====
- Type: Twin-shaft, high-bypass turbofan engine
- Length: 100 in (250 cm)
- Diameter: 52.2 in (133 cm)
- Dry weight: 1,478 lb (670 kg)

==== Components ====
- Compressor: Single-stage fan, 14 stage HP axial compressor
- Combustors: Axial, annular
- Turbine: 4 stage LP, 2 stage HP

==== Performance ====
- Maximum thrust: 9,275 lbf (41 kN; 4,207 kgf)
- Thrust-to-weight ratio: 6.28

== See also ==
Related development

- General Electric CF34

Comparable engines

- Lycoming YF102

Related lists

- List of aircraft engines
