= Allison T61 =

T61 / 550-B1
- Type: Turboprop
- National origin: United States
- Manufacturer: Allison Engine Company
- Major applications: Lockheed GL-207 Super Hercules
- Status: Canceled
- Number built: 4

The Allison T61 (known internally as the Allison 550-B1) was a 6,500-shaft-horsepower (4,800-kilowatt) turboprop engine that was to power the 1959 version of the proposed Lockheed Super Hercules military and civil freight aircraft. The U.S. Air Force (USAF) had helped Allison fund the development of the T61 for four years. Lockheed had received orders from Pan American World Airways and Slick Airways for a total of 18 aircraft, but both orders were contingent on the military ordering the aircraft by September 30, 1959, around the date that the USAF's engine development contract expired. The development contract was extended temporarily to November 30, 1959, but the T61 development effort was canceled by January 1960, after USD37.5 million had been put into the engine's development. Four T61 engines had run on the test stand at the time of cancellation.

The Allison T61 produced 6,500 equivalent shp (4,800 kW) at takeoff, of which 6,102 shp (4,550 kW) came from the propeller, with 995 pounds (451 kg) of residual jet thrust. It had a similar appearance to the Allison T56 but with a split compressor section instead of a single stage. The T61 improved on the power-to-weight ratio of the T56 by 30%. The Air Force had also given Allison's Aeroproducts Operations division a US$4 million contract to develop a 16 1/2 ft diameter (5.0 m), four-bladed propeller to use on the T61-powered Super Hercules.

== Specifications ==
Data from Aviation Week, October 5, 1959, page 30 and the 1960 Aerospace Year Book, page 91 and 375

==== General characteristics ====
- Type: Twin-spool turboprop
- Length: 142 in (3,600 mm)
- Diameter: 33 in (840 mm)
- Dry weight: 2,240 lb (1,020 kg)

==== Components ====
- Compressor: 9-stage high pressure, 6-stage low pressure
- Turbine: 2-stage high pressure, 3-stage low pressure

==== Performance ====
- Maximum power output: Takeoff: 6,500 equivalent shp (4,800 kW) @10,400 rpm; 90% cruise: 5,070 equivalent shp (3,780 kW)
- Turbine inlet temperature: 1,855 °F (1,013 °C; 2,315 °R; 1,286 K)
- Specific fuel consumption: Takeoff: 0.500 lb/(hp⋅h) (0.227 kg/(hp⋅h); 0.304 kg/kWh); Cruise (35,000 ft altitude (11,000 m), 320 kn (370 mph; 590 km/h)): 0.51 lb/(hp⋅h) (0.23 kg/(hp⋅h); 0.31 kg/kWh)

== See also ==
- Allison T56
- Pratt & Whitney T34
- Rolls-Royce Tyne

== Bibliography ==
- "Airline observer". Aviation Week. Vol. 71, no. 16. October 19, 1959. p. 49. ISSN 0005-2175.
- Butz, Jr., J.S. (June 15, 1959). "C-130 Hercules lengthened to increase long-range missions". Aviation Week. Vol. 70, no. 24. p. 62. ISSN 0005-2175.
- "Industry observer". Aviation Week. Vol. 69, no. 20. November 17, 1958. p. 23. ISSN 0005-2175.
