= Rolls-Royce Marine Spey =

Marine gas turbine

Marine Spey
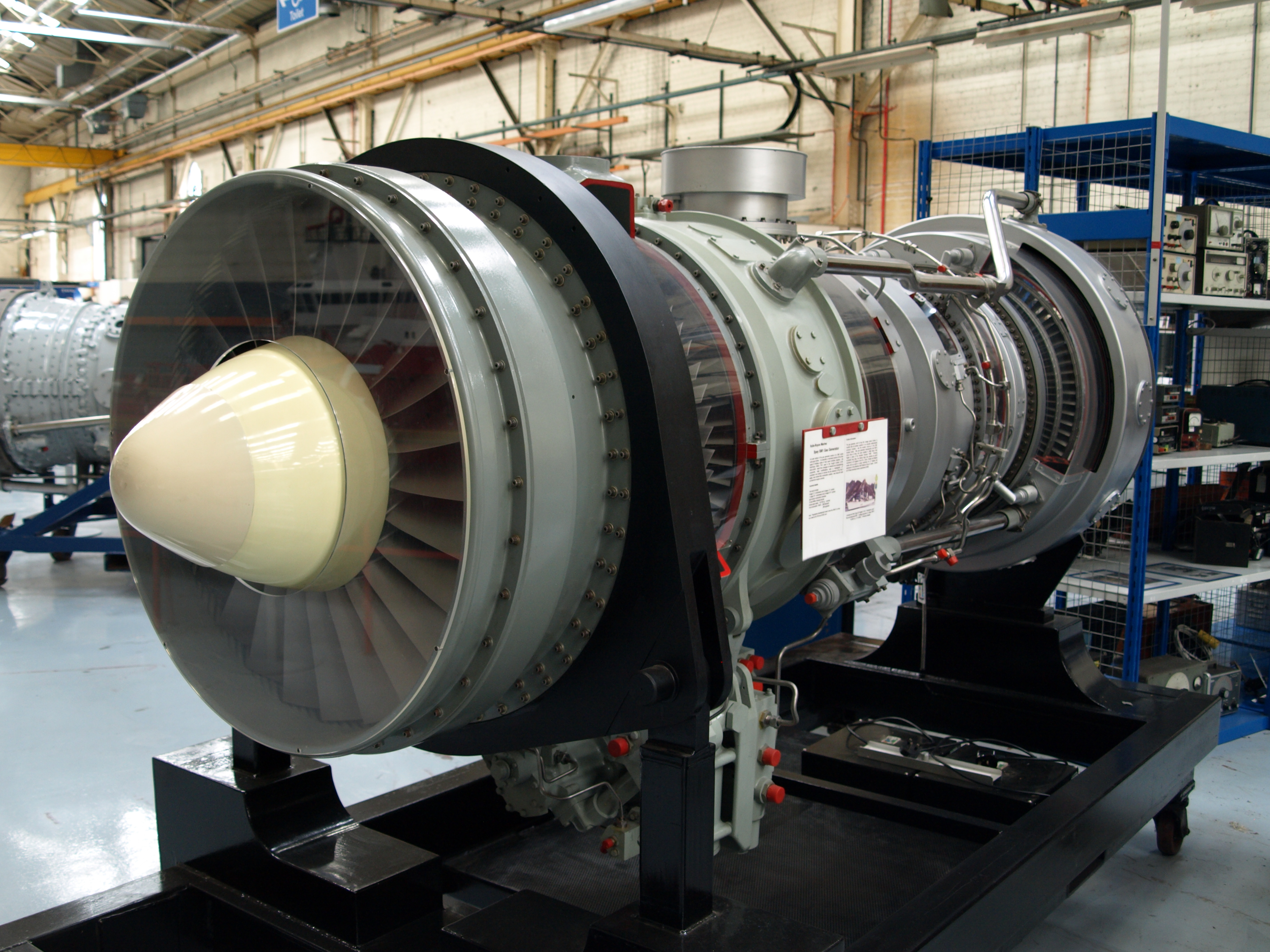
- Marine Spey on display at the Rolls-Royce Heritage Trust, Derby
- Type: Gas turbine
- National origin: United Kingdom
- Manufacturer: Rolls-Royce plc
- First run: 1960s
- Developed from: Rolls-Royce Spey

The Rolls-Royce Marine Spey is a marine gas turbine based on the Rolls-Royce Spey and TF41 aircraft turbofan engines. The Marine Spey currently powers seven ship classes including the Royal Navy's Type 23 frigates and provides a power output of 19.5 MW (about 26,150HP). The Marine Spey incorporates technology from the Tay and RB211.

== Applications ==
- Abukuma-class destroyer escort
- Akizuki-class destroyer
- Asagiri-class destroyer
- De Zeven Provinciën-class frigate
- Hatakaze-class destroyer
- Karel Doorman-class frigate
- Murasame-class destroyer
- Takanami-class destroyer
- Type 23 frigate
- Type 22 frigate

== See also ==
- Rolls-Royce MT30

Related development

- Rolls-Royce Spey
