= AXM Futsal Manado =

Pro futsal team

AXM FUTSAL MANADO
- Founded: 14 April 2015; 9 years ago, as Alveyro FC; 11 July 2015; 9 years ago, as AXM Futsal Manado
- Ground: Manado, North Sulawesi
- Owner: Fheiby Lumunon
- Chairman: (Indonesia) Alventura Pangemanan
- Manager: (Indonesia) Sylvester Rondonuwu

AXM Futsal Manado, also known as AXM, is a semi-pro futsal team in Manado, Indonesia. Founded in April 2015 by Alventura B. Pangemanan with an original name of Alveyro FC, the name was taken from the name of the founder's eldest son, Alveyro Xaverius Maldini Pangemanan.

The founder decide to change the name from Alveyro FC into AXM Futsal Manado because of the poor performances in some local tournaments, AXM won their first local tournament in the early July and announced their official team name and logo on July 11, 2015. AXM Jersey Manufacturer is D9MS Sportwear, an Indonesia Football Apparel. Under the management of Alventura B. Pangemanan, Fhey Lumunon and Calvin Panginda, AXM successfully hosted a Coaching Clinic with Bonsu Hasibuan, an AFC Licensed and Vamos Mataram Coach, and Andriansyah, an Indonesia National Futsal Team Player and Ex-Vamos Mataram Captain, as the main speaker and trainer that was held on GOR Politeknik Manado in the early of June 2017.

== History ==
=== Early years ===
AXM Futsal Manado were founded in April 2015 by Alventura B. Pangemanan as Alveyro FC, but renamed to AXM Futsal Manado 3 Months Later. The team first tournament was AUS-Finnest Cup and reached the 3rd Place. After 3 Months without winning any tournaments some players went out from the team and joining some other rival teams. With the team captain, James Giroth, and some players that stayed, AXM won their first local tournament after beating their rival 3–0 on the group stage in July 2015. Aldair Makatindu, a Pusamania Borneo player, was on a holiday before Jend. Sudirman Cup also took part on the winning team in July 2015.

=== Birth of a New Generation ===
Some new Players like Risto Taduminggir and Andre Manuty brought AXM some trophies including Pa'dior Cup with Risto Taduminggir scored a last minute goal against El Ragnarok and AXM won on a penalty with Maryo Luhukay, AXM's Goalkeeper, played an outstanding performance. In late 2015, AXM sent some players and the team coach, Ronny Soputan, to be joining North Sulawesi Futsal Team for the Pre-PON(Pekan Olahraga Nasional) and the Sam Ratulangi University POMNAS(Pekan Olahraga Mahasiswa Nasional) Team, that also includes Risto Taduminggir and Andre Manuty.

=== AXM Jr. ===
Acting like AXM's second team made new and less experience players played and fight for their place in the main team, and players such like Risto and Andre were once played for the AXM Jr. and gained promotion to the AXM Main Team. In some local tournaments AXM are allowed to register two teams in one tournament, and AXM Jr. once played against AXM in a local tournament but eventually lost to their main team with a score of 9–3. In Sam Ratulangi University Tournaments, AXM and AXM Jr. met in the finals and get the 1st and 2nd Rank. AXM Jr. won Perindo Cup 2016 and represent Perindo of North Sulawesi in the National Competition against other provinces. Current First Team Vice-Captain and one of the longest serving player, David Kolanus, started his career as a second choice goalkeeper in AXM Jr.

== Players ==
=== Current squad ===
As of 10 July 2019

Note: Flags indicate national team as defined under FIFA eligibility rules; some limited exceptions apply. Players may hold more than one non-FIFA nationality.

| No. | Pos. | Nation | Player |
|---|---|---|---|
| 1 | GK | (Indonesia) IDN | MARVIEL TARRU |
| 2 | GK | (Indonesia) IDN | DAVID KOLANUS (vice-captain) |
| 3 | DF | (Indonesia) IDN | VIERI SOPUTAN |
| 4 | DF | (Indonesia) IDN | RIVALDO PALIT |
| 6 | DF | (Indonesia) IDN | RHIVALDO SAADA |
| 8 | DF | (Indonesia) IDN | WAHID IBRAHIM |
| 9 | FW | (Indonesia) IDN | RONALD INZAGHI |
| 10 | FW | (Indonesia) IDN | RIZKI PERMANA (captain) |
| 11 | FW | (Indonesia) IDN | ROBERT DOTULONG |
| 12 | FW | (Indonesia) IDN | VIJAI LAURENS |
| 13 | FW | (Indonesia) IDN | DILIVIO MAMUAJA |
| 14 | FW | (Indonesia) IDN | DANIEL UNMEHOPA |
| 15 | FW | (Indonesia) IDN | SHEVCHENKO PONGOH |
| 17 | FW | (Indonesia) IDN | SYAHRIL AZIS |
| 18 | DF | (Indonesia) IDN | DEDY TJIEN |
| 19 | DF | (Indonesia) IDN | PAPUA KOYOGA |
| 20 | DF | (Indonesia) IDN | DEDE MAHAYUDIN |

== Managerial History ==
Below is a list of all AXM Futsal Manado Managers from 2015 until the present day.

| Name | Nationality | Years |
|---|---|---|
| Valen | (Indonesia) | 2015 |
| Ronny Soputan | (Indonesia) | 2016 |
| Jun | (Indonesia) | 2017 |
| Aulia Rahman | (Indonesia) | 2017 |
| Sylvester Rondonuwu | (Indonesia) | 2017-Current |

== Popularity ==
AXM Futsal Manado establishment shocked many Manado Futsal Fans because of many former LFN 2013 Champions and Runner-Up players that joined the new local futsal team. Players like James Giroth, Filemon Ginting, Vially Soputan, Indra Tampemawa and Ronald Runtukahu joined AXM in 2015, and played for AXM as one of the best known players in North Sulawesi. Gaining people's attention after being the back-to-back Champions of Padior Cup and being the Runner-Up on Tidar Cup. Gaining Indonesia Futsal Fans' attention after inviting Bonsu Hasibuan and Andriansyah to do a Coaching Clinic in Manado, and being a part of Vamos Futsal Academy under Bonsu Hasibuan. Keep gaining people's attention after Bayu Saptaji, a Vamos Mataram player, keep on supporting AXM via Instagram in many big occasions.
