= Allison TF41 =

Low-bypass turbofan engine

TF41 Spey
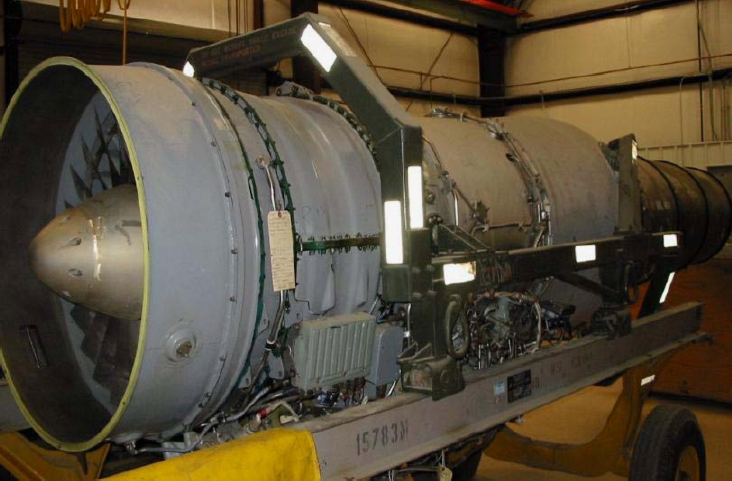
- An Allison TF41-A-1B turbofan
- Type: Turbofan
- Manufacturer: Allison Engine Company / Rolls-Royce Limited
- First run: 1967
- Major applications: LTV A-7 Corsair II
- Number built: 1,440
- Developed from: Rolls-Royce Spey

The Allison TF41 (Company designations RB.168-62 and Model 912) is a low-bypass turbofan engine.

== Design and development ==
The TF41 was jointly developed by Allison Engine Company and Rolls-Royce from the latter's RB.168-25R Spey. Allison manufactured the TF41 under license, while Rolls-Royce supplied parts common to existing Speys. The TF41 was developed for use in the LTV A-7D Corsair II for the USAF, and the US Navy's A-7E. Between 1968 and 1983, a total of 1,440 TF41s were delivered.

== Applications ==
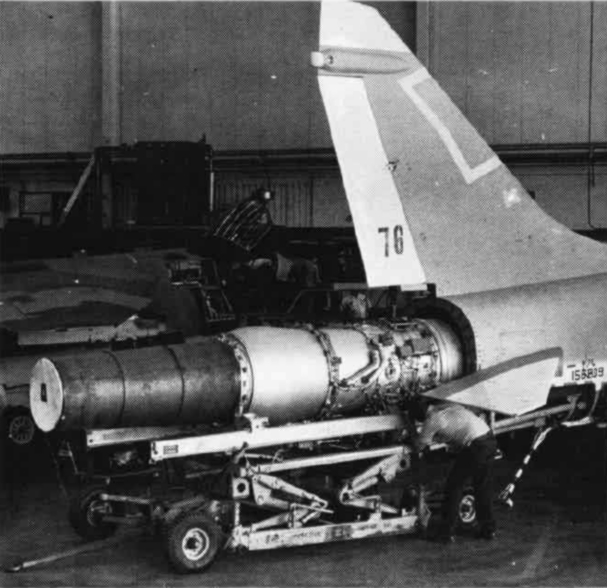
A TF41 of a U.S. Navy A-7E-4-CV Corsair II (BuNo 156809).

- LTV A-7 Corsair II (USAF -D/-K and US Navy -E models),

== Specifications (TF41-A-1) ==
Data from Flight.

==== General characteristics ====
- Type: Turbofan
- Length: 114.5 in (2908.3 mm)
- Diameter: 40 in (1016 mm)
- Dry weight: 3,511 lb (1592.6 kg)

==== Components ====
- Compressor: Three-stage LP compressor, two-stage IP compressor (both driven by LP turbine),11-stage HP compressor
- Combustors: Cannular combustor with ten flame tubes
- Turbine: Two-stage LP, Two-stage HP

==== Performance ====
- Maximum thrust: 14,250 lb (64.5 kN)
- Overall pressure ratio: 20:1
- Bypass ratio: 0.77:1
- Air mass flow: 258 lb/s (117 kg/s)
- Thrust-to-weight ratio: 4.06

== See also ==
Related development

- Rolls-Royce Spey

Comparable engines

- Pratt & Whitney TF30

Related lists

- List of aircraft engines
