= Xi'an Aero-Engine Corporation =

Chinese aircraft engine designer and manufacturer

- Native name: 西安航空发动机集团有限公司
- Industry: Aerospace
- Headquarters: Xi'an, Shaanxi, China
- Products: Aircraft engines
- Parent: Xi'an Aircraft Industrial Corporation

Xi'an Aero-Engine Corporation (XAEC, Chinese: 西安航空发动机集团有限公司) is one of the major aircraft engine designers and manufacturers in China, originally established in 2001. It along with its parent company (via the Xihang Group), Xi'an Aircraft Industrial Corporation, is affiliated with the Aviation Industry Corporation of China (AVIC). XAEC is primarily located in the province of Shaanxi.

The company with 96,000 employees, is focused on designing, manufacturing and testing of aircraft engines. The Huarong Asset Management Corporation is/was also an equity partner in XAEC through the Xihang Group.

== Products ==
- WP-8
- WS-9 - Chinese license production of Rolls-Royce Spey 202
- WS-15 to power J-20 stealth fighter.
- WS-20 to power Xi'an Y-20 heavy transport.

== See also ==
- China Beijing Equity Exchange
