= Allison Engine Company =

American aircraft engine manufacturer

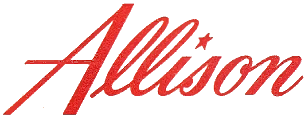
- Type: Division
- Industry: Aerospace
- Founder: James Allison
- Defunct: 1995
- Fate: Acquired by Rolls-Royce
- Successor: Rolls-Royce North America
- Headquarters: Indianapolis, Indiana, United States
- Parent: General Motors

The Allison Engine Company was an American aircraft engine manufacturer. Shortly after the death of James Allison in 1929 the company was purchased by the Fisher brothers. Fisher sold the company to General Motors, which owned it for most of its history. It was acquired by Rolls-Royce in 1995 to become Rolls-Royce North America.

== History ==
A predecessor of Allison Engine Company, the Concentrated Acetylene Company, was founded in September 1904 by James Allison, Percy Avery and Carl Fisher. Avery was the holder of the patent for the product. This company was the predecessor of Prest-O-Lite, a manufacturer of acetylene headlights. An explosion at the acetylene gas works in downtown Indianapolis caused the company to relocate out of town, near the race track in Speedway, Indiana. Allison and Fisher raced automobiles at that track, each owning a race car team. This hobby resulted in Allison building a shop at the track in Speedway where he maintained his fleet of race cars. This shop became the site for Allison Plant #1. Fisher and Allison sold their interest in Prest-O-Lite to Union Carbide for $9 million.

=== Allison Speedway Team Company ===
Allison started as an engine and car "hot rodding" company servicing the Indianapolis Motor Speedway in Indianapolis. James Allison was the owner of the Indianapolis Speedway Team Company, a race car business in Indianapolis, Indiana. While it was founded as the Indianapolis Speedway Team Company, its name changed numerous times, first to the Allison Speedway Team Company, then the Allison Experimental Company and last as the Allison Engineering Company before becoming a division of General Motors.

The company's only regular production item was a patented steel-backed lead bearing, which was used in various high performance engines. (Note: According to the "Allison War Album" produced by the company and distributed to employees prior to the end of World War II (soon after D-Day), this was a steel-backed bronze (not lead) bearing. According to the company document, "A Liberty engine [the company had been engaged with rebuilding these for the Army] equipped with an experimental cooling system broke down after a 31-hour test stand run because of connecting rod bearing failure. The cause was discovered and a cure worked out in the form of a steel-backed bronze bearing. The excellence of the Allison bearing resulted in its wide use in such engines as those of Pratt & Whitney, Wright and Rolls-Royce, and Allison became one of the leaders of the world in bearing manufacture." A by-product of this experience was the "development of a method of ultra-violet detection of defective bearing material, which won a special commendation from the U.S. Army." A copy of a Western Union telegraph from Brig General George C. Kenny, Materiel Div. Wright Field, citing this accomplishment also appears in the War Album.) It also built various drive shafts, extensions and gear chains for high power engines, on demand. Later its main business was the conversion of older Liberty engines to more powerful models, both for aircraft and marine use.

Allison needed a place where his race car engines could be modified and repaired. On January 1, 1917, Allison moved into a building at what was to become, in later years, the Indianapolis Motor Speedway. Along with the move, Allison hired Norman H. Gillman, a very talented engineer from a competing race team, as his chief engineer.

=== Allison's move to Florida ===
Allison moved to Florida to invest in real estate after World War I, leaving Gillman in charge. Allison did not want the company to wither, so he asked Gillman to build a V-12 marine engine worthy of the Allison name. Gillman then proceeded to build an engine that relied on what was learned from building and modifying the venerable Liberty engine.

Allison's company was sold to Captain Eddie Rickenbacker in 1927 for $700,000 after Allison moved to Florida. In 1929, shortly after the death of James Allison, the company was purchased by the Fisher brothers. The Fishers sold the company to General Motors, who owned it for most of its history. The Allison Engine Company was acquired in 1995 by Rolls-Royce, and became the Rolls-Royce North America subsidiary.

=== Hyper engine ===
In the late 1920s the United States Army funded the development of a series of high-power engines, as part of its hyper engine series, which it intended to produce on Continental Motors' production lines. Allison's manager, Norman Gilman, decided to experiment with his own high-power cylinder design. Allison's engine became Manufacturer Serial No. 1, AAC S/N 25-521. It was the X-4520, a 24-cylinder air-cooled 4-bank “X” configured engine designed by the Army Air Corps and built by the Allison Engineering Company in 1925. The result was presented to the Army in 1928, which turned down the development proposal.

=== General Motors ===
In 1929, shortly after the death of James Allison, the company was purchased by the Fisher brothers, who instructed it to use the cylinder design for a six-cylinder engine for a "family aircraft". Before work on this design had progressed very far, Fisher sold the company to General Motors, which ended development owing to financial pressures of the Great Depression. Nevertheless, Gilman pressed ahead with the cylinder design, building a "paper project" V-12 engine. The Army was once again uninterested, but instead suggested Allison try selling it to the United States Navy. The Navy agreed to fund development of A and B models to a very limited degree for its airships, until the crash of the USS Macon in 1935, when the Navy's need for a 1,000 hp (750 kW) engine disappeared.

==== V-1710 ====
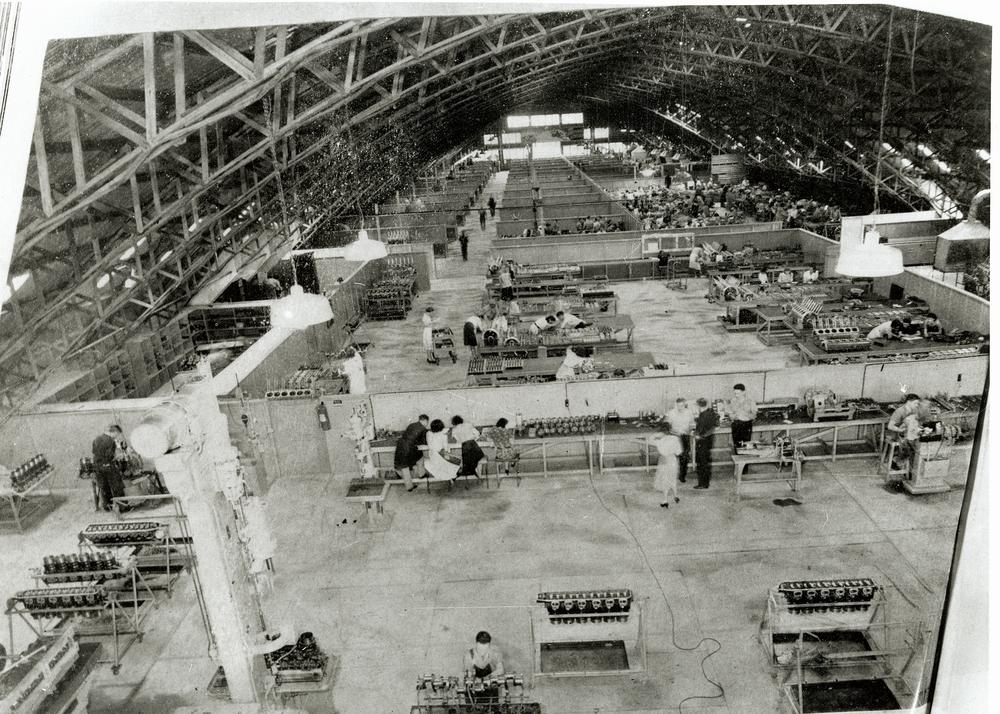
GMH Allison Overhaul Assembly Plant in Brisbane during the Second World War

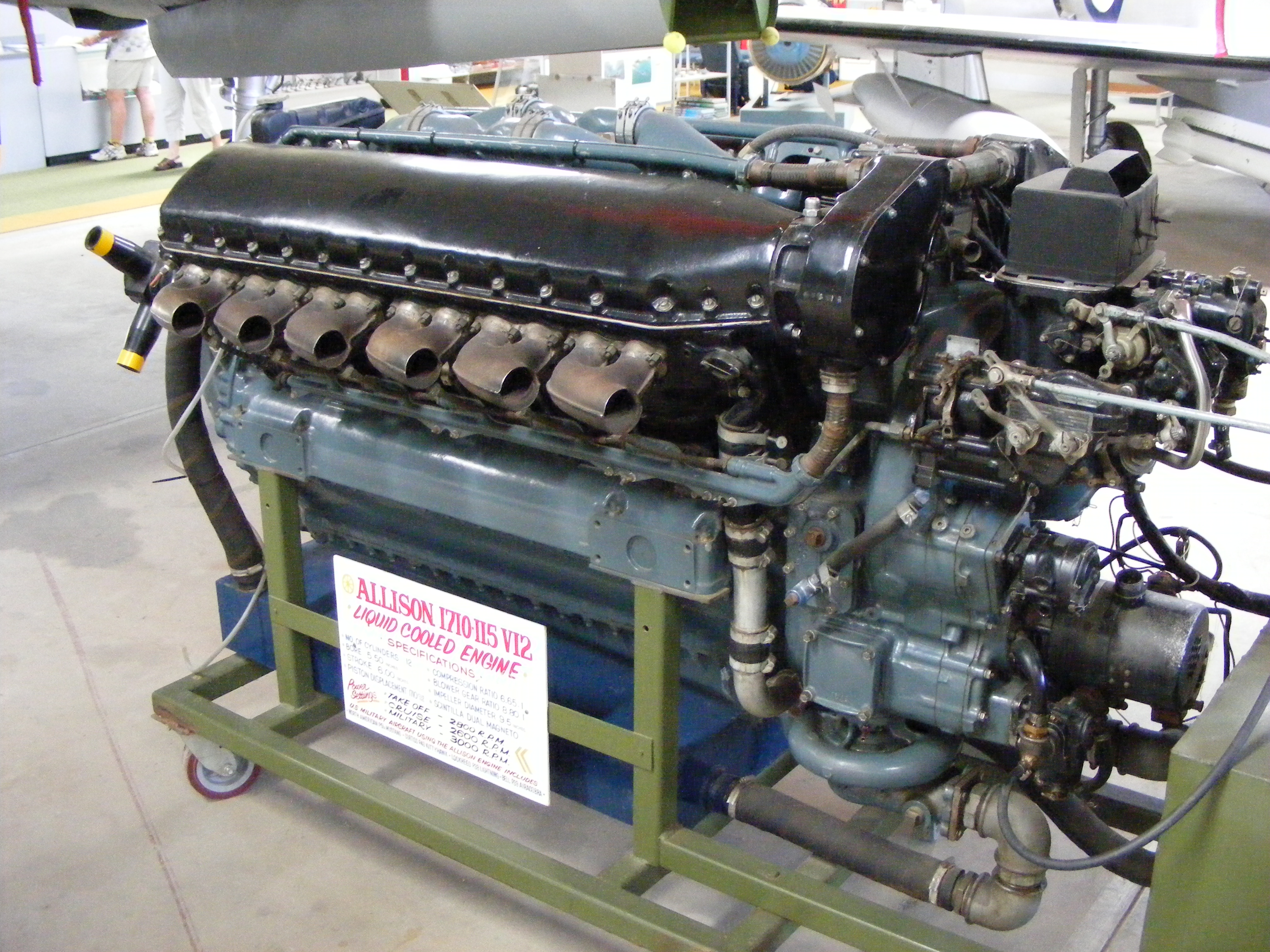
Allison V-1710-115

The very first V-1710 was purchased by the U.S. Navy as their GV-1710-2, and appears to have had an Allison serial of number 1, suggesting that they restarted numbering for the V-1710. The first V-1710 engine purchased by the USAAC was AAC 33-42, Allison Serial No. 2, the XV-1710-1, while Serial Nos. 3, 4, 5 were V-1710-4 engines for U.S. Navy airships, followed by a batch of 11 Air Corps engines purchased with FY-1934 funds (34-4 through 34-14) that covered Allison serials 6 through 16. After these the production race was on, totaling over 70,000 V-1710s.

By this time the Army had become more interested in the design, and asked Allison to continue with a new "C" model. They had few funds of their own to invest, and Allison supported much of the development out of their own pocket. The V-1710-C first flew on 14 December 1936 in the Consolidated A-11A testbed. The V-1710-C6 completed the Army 150 hour Type Test on 23 April 1937, at 1,000 hp (750 kW), the first engine of any type to do so. By then all of the other Army engine projects had been cancelled or withdrawn, leaving the V-1710 as the only modern design available. It was soon found as the primary power plant of the new generation of United States Army Air Corps (USAAC) fighters, the P-38 Lightning, P-39 Airacobra and P-40 Warhawk.

The Army had been leaning heavily towards exhaust-driven turbochargers, instead of the more common mechanically driven superchargers, favoring the theoretical advantage of using the otherwise wasted energy in the exhaust. Thus, little effort was invested in equipping the V-1710 with a complex two-stage supercharger, and when placed in aircraft designs like the P-39 or P-40, which lacked the room for a turbocharger, the engine suffered tremendously at higher altitudes. It was for this reason in particular that the V-1710 was later removed from the P-51 Mustang and replaced with the Rolls-Royce Merlin.

=== Post-war ===
With the need for the V-1710 winding down at the end of the war, Allison found itself with a large production infrastructure that was no longer needed. For this reason, in 1947, the Army decided to take General Electric's versions of Frank Whittle's jet engines and give them to Allison to produce instead. The main production model was GE's 4,000 lbf (18 kN) I-40, produced as the Allison J33. By the time production ended in 1955, Allison had produced over 7,000 J33s.

Allison also took over GE's axial flow engine design, becoming the Allison J35. The J35 was the primary powerplant for the F-84 Thunderjet and F-89 Scorpion, as well as appearing on numerous prototype designs. The J35 also finished production in 1955, by which point over 14,000 had been delivered.

Allison also began development of a series of turboprop engines for the U.S. Navy, starting with the T38 and a "twinned" version as the T40. The Navy was interested only in the T40, but the complexities of the drive shaft arrangement doomed the engine and the project was eventually cancelled. Allison tried again with the T56, basically an enlarged T38 with the power of the T40, and was eventually rewarded when this engine was selected to power the C-130 Hercules. Allison turboprop engines were also used to re-engine Convair prop airliners which resulted in the Convair 580 turboprop passenger aircraft which was widely used by local service and regional airlines in the U.S. such as Allegheny Airlines, the original Frontier Airlines, North Central Airlines, as well as major carriers American, Eastern, United, and Pan-Am.

Over the years a family of engines based on the T56 configuration was developed, culminating in the T406/Allison AE1107 turboshaft for the V-22 Osprey, the Allison AE2100 turboprop, used on newer models of the C-130 and the Allison/Rolls-Royce AE 3007 turbofan which propels many regional airline aircraft, such as the Embraer ERJ 135, ERJ 140 and ERJ 145 family of regional passenger jets that continue to be widely used in the airline industry.

One of Allison's most successful projects is the Model 250 turboshaft/turboprop engine family, which was started by the company in the early 1960s, when helicopters started to be powered by turbine, rather than reciprocating, engines. Allison turbine engines were used to power Bell 206 JetRanger and LongRanger helicopters, as well as the initial version of the Sikorsky S-76 helicopter.

=== Experiments ===
In the mid-1970s the Allison Division of General Motors in Detroit designed ceramic components into the Allison GT 404-4 turboshaft engine intended for trucks. Allison continued to work with General Motors on development of ceramic-turbine powered engines until the early 1990s. During their work they were able to engineer fairly stable automobile engines that were capable of burning a variety of fuels, such as gasoline, Diesel, kerosene, alcohol, vegetable oil, and coal powder.

In the 1980s Allison collaborated with Pratt & Whitney on demonstrating the 578-DX propfan. Unlike the competing General Electric GE-36 UDF, the 578-DX was fairly conventional, having a reduction gearbox between the LP turbine and the propfan blades. Noise considerations, plus a significant reduction in the real cost of aviation fuel, brought the NASA funded program to a halt.

In 1995, Allison tested a prototype lift fan for the Joint Strike Fighter Program and a LiftFan nozzle was tested in 1997 at NASA's Lewis facility. By 1997, a complete prototype had been demonstrated by the Rolls-Royce owned but American-controlled Allison Advanced Development Company.

=== Automotive use ===
In 1965 a drag racer, Jim Lytle, created a car known as Quad Al which incorporated four World War II surplus V-12 Allison aero-engines in a four-wheel drive configuration, and developing approximately 12,000 hp (8,900 kW). Although its engines started, it never ran; the creator could not afford the custom gearboxes and clutches required to handle the enormous torque generated by the engines. The car survives, without its engines, in Indiana, USA.

=== Acquisition by Rolls-Royce ===
In 1992 General Motors tried to sell Allison to concentrate on rebuilding automobile market share. Rolls-Royce attempted to buy the company in 1993, but General Motors opted for a management buyout instead for $370 million.

In 1995 US authorities approved, with restrictions on Joint Strike Fighter Program, the purchase of Allison by Rolls-Royce. The price was $525 million. In the year 2000, some of these restrictions were alleviated, and in 2001 the US government chose the F-35 with Rolls-Royce LiftFan and Pratt & Whitney F135 engines. Allison was also a partner with General Electric and Rolls-Royce on the F136 Fighter Engine Team.

== Products ==
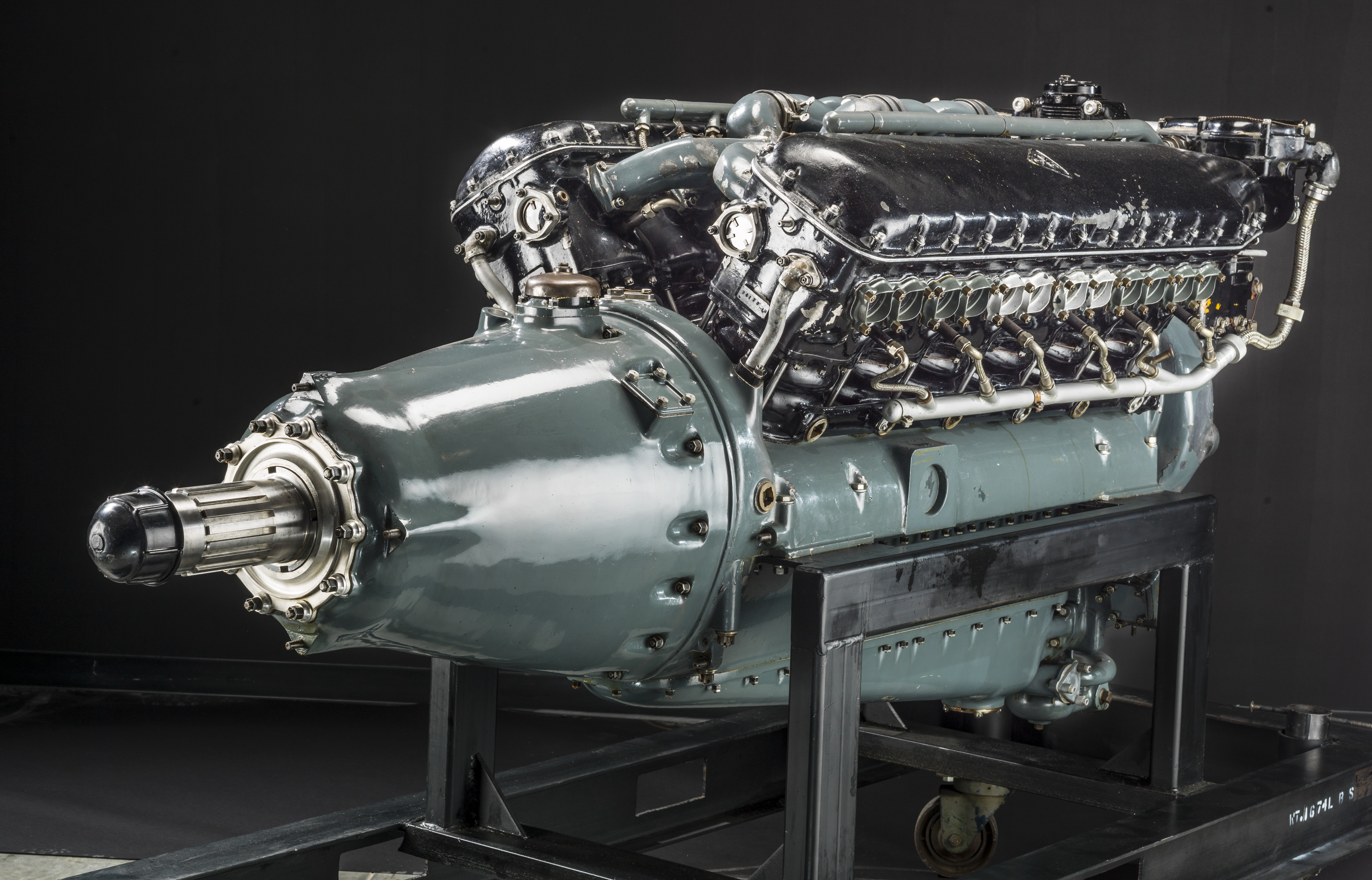
Allison V-1710-7

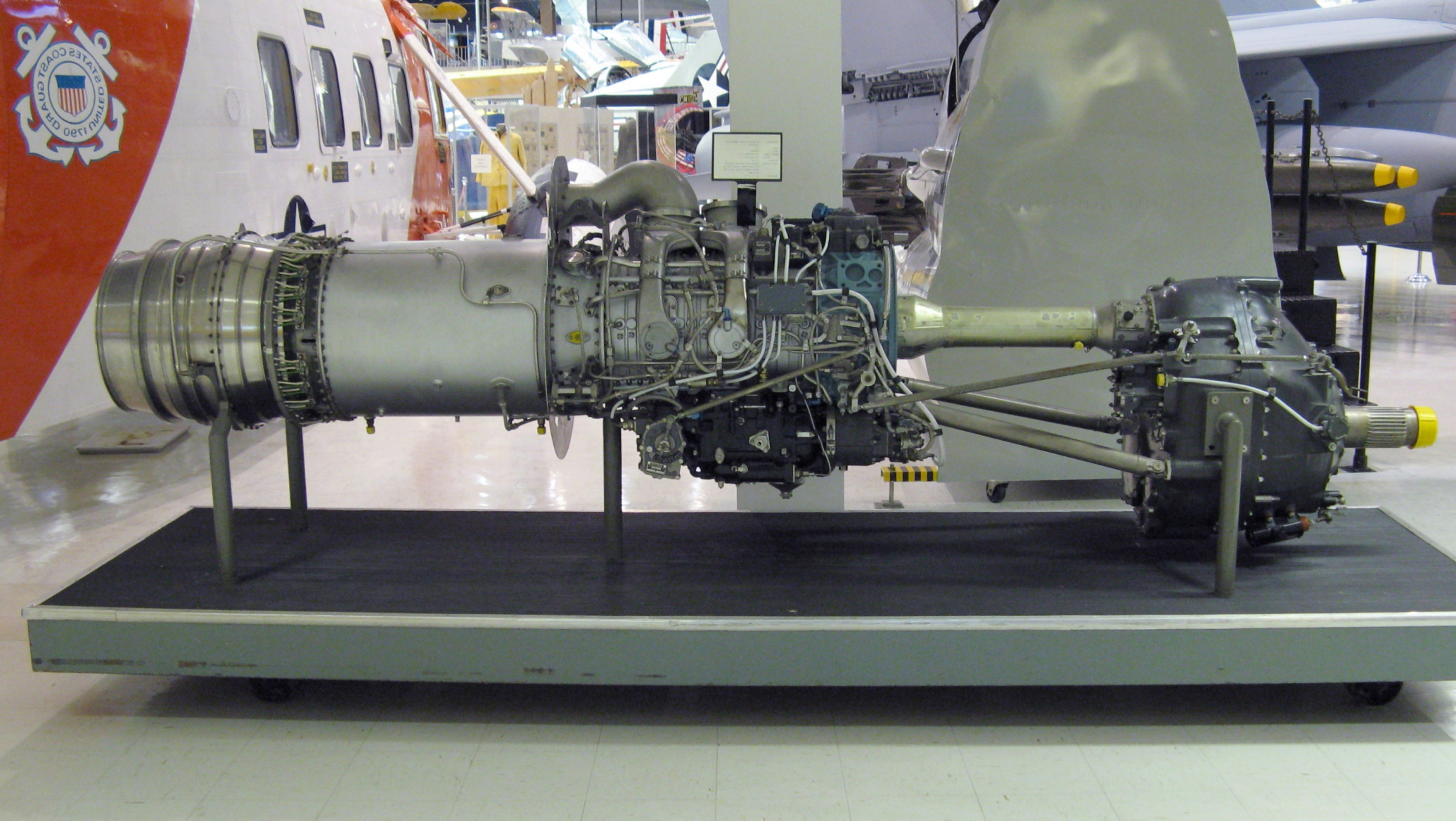
Allison T56

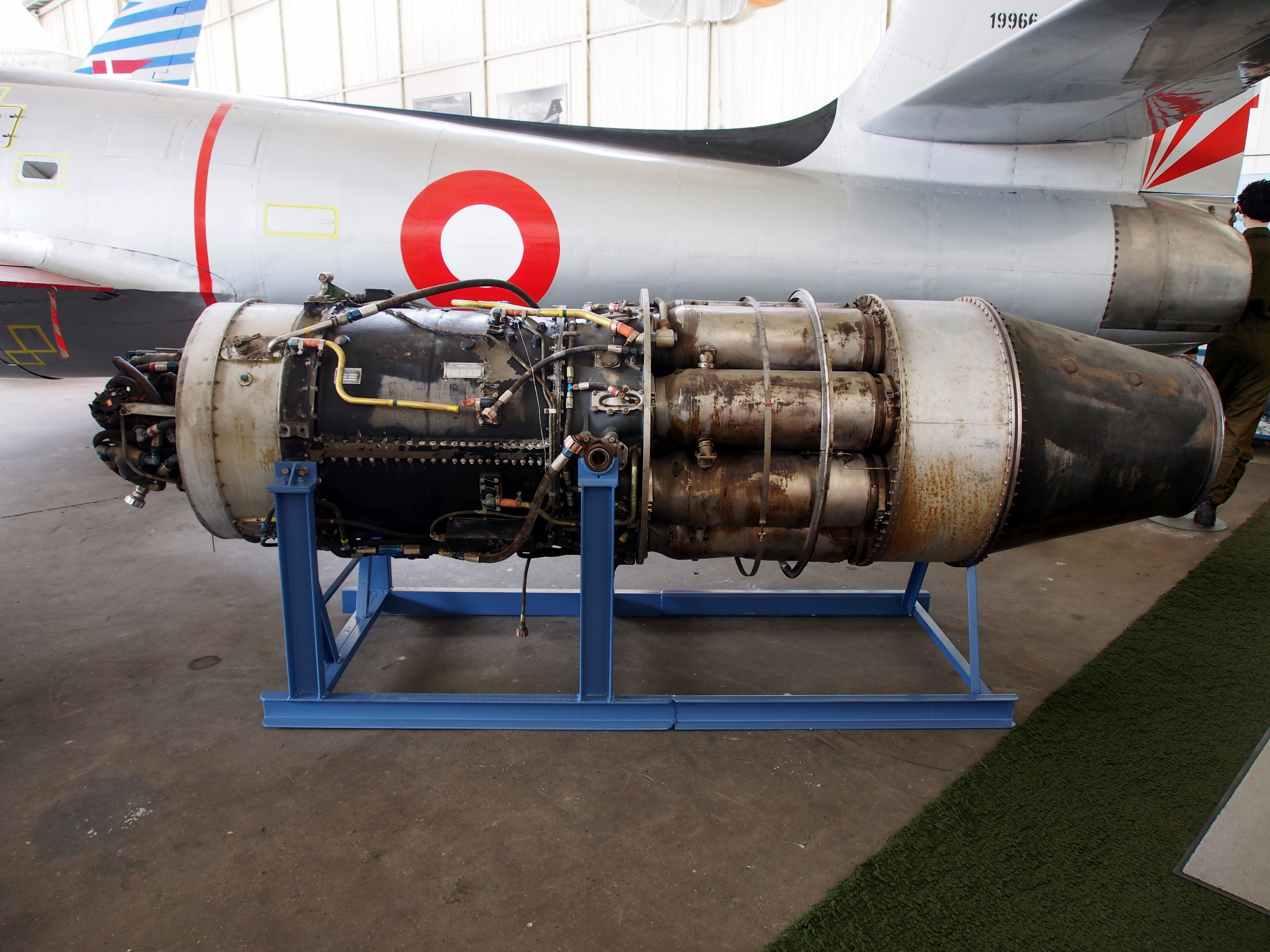
Allison J35

| Model name | Configuration | Power |
|---|---|---|
| Allison V-1710 | V12 | 1,100 hp |
| Allison V-3420 | W24 | 2,100 hp |
| Allison J33 | Turbojet | 3,900 lbf |
| Allison J35 | Turbojet | 5,600 lbf |
| Allison J71 | Turbojet | 10,000 lbf |
| Allison J102 | Turbojet | |
| Allison TF41 | Turbofan | 14,250 lbf |
| General Electric/Allison/Rolls-Royce F136 | Turbofan | 28,000 lbf |
| Allison AE 3007 | Turbofan | 7,580 to 9,500 lbf |
| Allison 250/T63 | Turboshaft | 317 hp |
| Allison AE 2100 | Turboprop | 4,637 hp |
| Allison T38 | Turboprop | 2,550 hp |
| Allison T40 | Turboprop | 5,100 hp |
| Allison T56 | Turboprop | 5,912 hp |
| Allison T61 | Turboprop | 6,500 hp |
| Allison T71 | | |
| Allison T78 | Turboprop | 4,000 hp |
| Allison T80 | | |
| Allison T406 | Turboshaft | 6,150 hp |
| Allison T701 | Turboshaft | 8,079 hp |
| Pratt & Whitney/Allison 578-DX | Propfan | 22,000 lbf |

== See also ==
Related Company

- Allison Transmission
