= Wing configuration =

Describes the general shape and layout of an aircraft wing

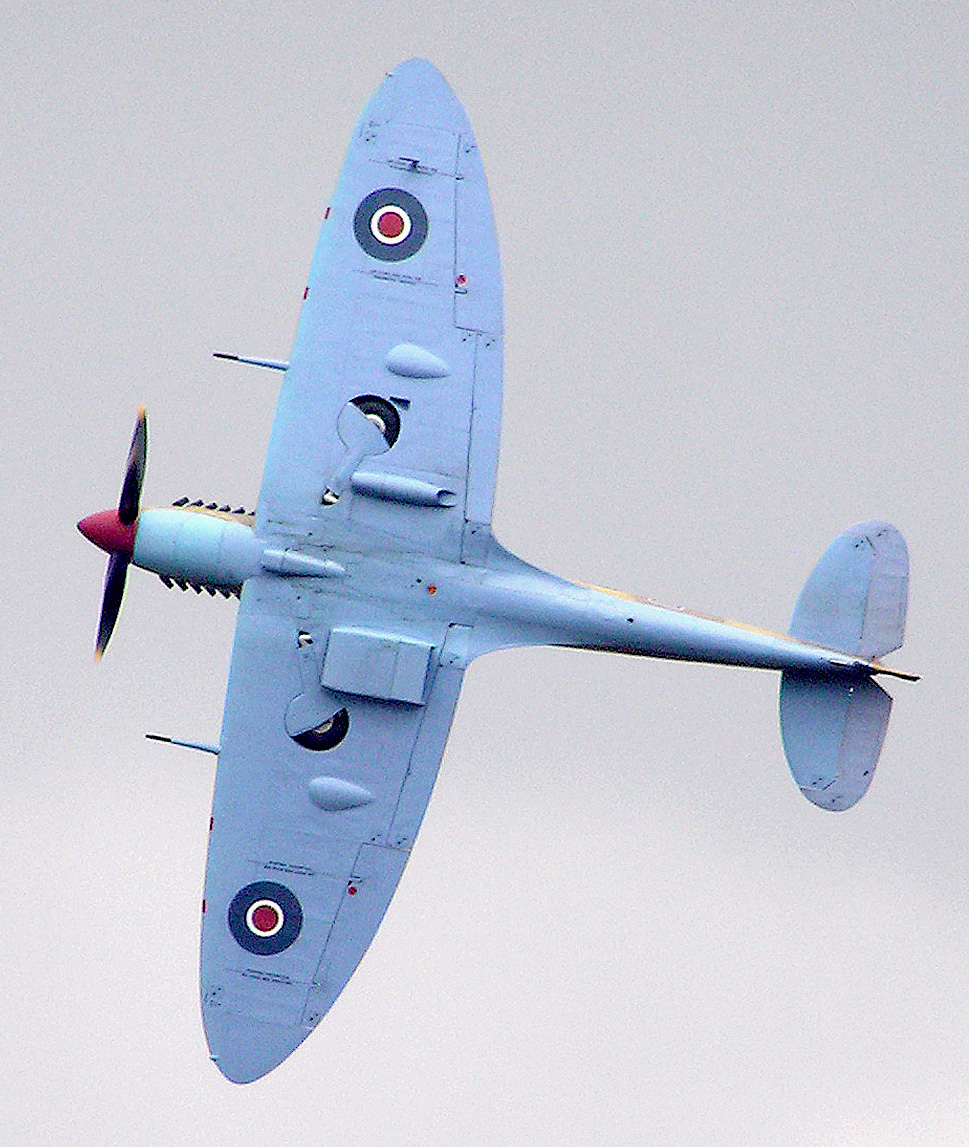
The Spitfire wing may be classified as: "a conventional low-wing cantilever monoplane with unswept elliptical wings of moderate aspect ratio and slight dihedral".

The wing configuration or planform of a fixed-wing aircraft (including both gliders and powered aeroplanes) is its arrangement of lifting and related surfaces.

Aircraft designs are often classified by their wing configuration. For example, the Supermarine Spitfire is a conventional low wing cantilever monoplane of straight elliptical planform with moderate aspect ratio and slight dihedral.

Many variations have been tried. Sometimes the distinction between them is blurred, for example the wings of many modern combat aircraft may be described either as cropped compound deltas with (forwards or backwards) swept trailing edge, or as sharply tapered swept wings with large leading edge root extensions (or LERX). Some are therefore duplicated here under more than one heading. This is particularly so for variable geometry and combined (closed) wing types.

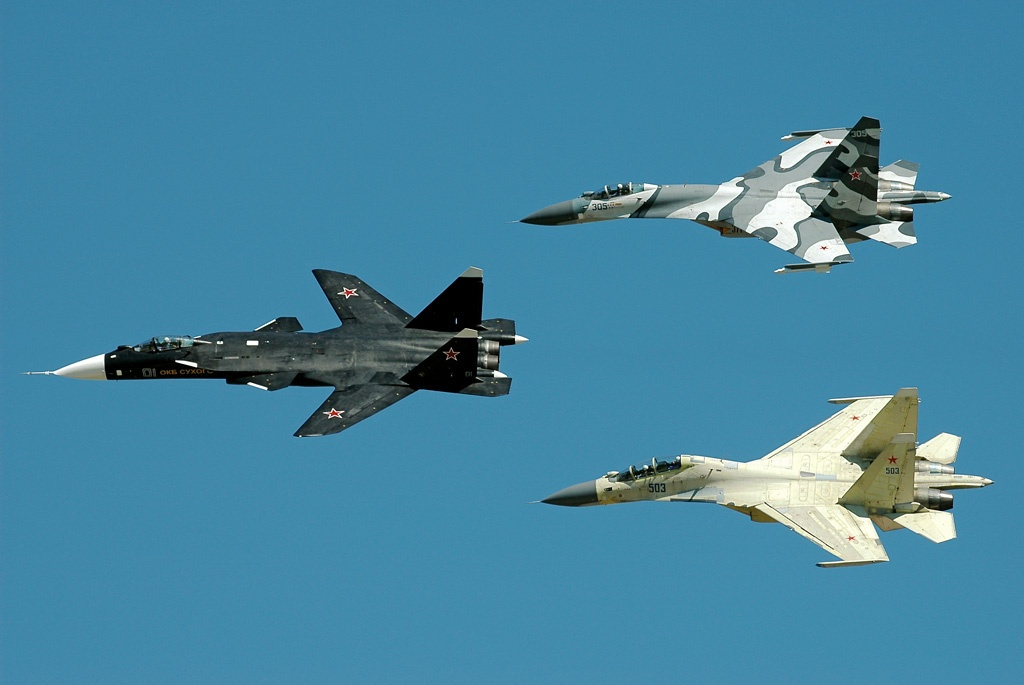
A forward-swept-wing Sukhoi Su-47 alongside the more conventional swept-back Su-27 and Su-30MK2.

Most of the configurations described here have flown (if only very briefly) on full-size aircraft. A few theoretical designs are also notable.

Note on terminology: Most fixed-wing aircraft have left hand and right hand wings in a symmetrical arrangement. Strictly, such a pair of wings is called a wing plane or just plane. However, in certain situations it is common to refer to a plane as a wing, as in "a biplane has two wings", or alternatively to refer to the whole thing as a wing, as in "a biplane wing has two planes". Where the meaning is clear, this article follows common usage, only being more precise where needed to avoid real ambiguity or incorrectness.

== Number and position of main planes ==
Fixed-wing aircraft can have different numbers of wings:

- Monoplane: one wing plane. Since the 1930s most aeroplanes have been monoplanes. The wing may be mounted at various positions relative to the fuselage:
  - Low wing: mounted near or below the bottom of the fuselage.
  - Mid wing: mounted approximately halfway up the fuselage.
  - Shoulder wing: mounted on the upper part or "shoulder" of the fuselage, slightly below the top of the fuselage. A shoulder wing is sometimes considered a subtype of high wing.
  - High wing: mounted on the upper fuselage. When contrasted to the shoulder wing, applies to a wing mounted on a projection (such as the cabin roof) above the top of the main fuselage.
  - Parasol wing: raised clear above the top of the fuselage, typically by cabane struts, pylon(s) or pedestal(s).
Low wing

Mid wing

Shoulder wing

High wing

Parasol wing

A fixed-wing aircraft may have more than one wing plane, stacked one above another:

- Biplane: two wing planes of similar size, stacked one above the other. The biplane is inherently lighter and stronger than a monoplane and was the most common configuration until the 1930s. The very first Wright Flyer I was a biplane.
  - Unequal-span biplane: a biplane in which one wing (usually the lower) is shorter than the other, as on the Curtiss JN-4 Jenny of the First World War.
  - Sesquiplane: literally "one-and-a-half planes" is a type of biplane in which the lower wing is significantly smaller than the upper wing, either in span or chord or both. The Nieuport 17 of World War I was notably successful.
  - Inverted sesquiplane: has a significantly smaller upper wing. The Fiat CR.1 was in production for many years.
  - Busemann biplane: a theoretical supersonic wing configuration, in which shock waves between the wing planes interfere to reduce their energy and wave drag.
Biplane

Unequal-span biplane

Sesquiplane

Inverted sesquiplane

Busemann biplane in cross-section
- Triplane: three planes stacked one above another. Triplanes such as the Fokker Dr.I enjoyed a brief period of popularity during the First World War due to their manoeuvrability, but were soon replaced by improved biplanes.
- Quadruplane: four planes stacked one above another. A small number of the Armstrong Whitworth F.K.10 were built in the First World War but never saw service.
- Multiplane: many planes, sometimes used to mean more than one or more than some arbitrary number. The term is occasionally applied to arrangements stacked in tandem as well as vertically. The 1907 Multiplane of Horatio Frederick Phillips flew successfully with two hundred wing foils. See also the tandem wing, below.
Triplane

Quadruplane

Multiplane

A staggered design has the upper wing slightly forward of the lower. Long thought to reduce the interference caused by the low pressure air over the lower wing mixing with the high pressure air under the upper wing; however the improvement is minimal and its primary benefit is to improve access to the fuselage. It is common on many successful biplanes and triplanes. Backwards stagger is also seen in a few examples such as the Beechcraft Staggerwing.

Unstaggered biplane

Forwards stagger

Backwards stagger
- A tandem wing design has two wings, one behind the other: see Tailplanes and foreplanes below. Some early types had tandem stacks of multiple planes, such as the nine-wing Caproni Ca.60 flying boat with three triplane stacks in tandem.
- A cruciform wing is a set of four individual wings arranged in the shape of a cross. The cross may take either of two forms:
  - Wings equally spaced around the cross-section of the fuselage, lying in two planes at right angles, as on a typical missile.
  - Wings lying together in a single horizontal plane about a vertical axis, as in the cruciform rotor wing or X-wing.
Cruciform wing weapon

Cruciform rotor wing or X wing rotor

== Support ==
To support itself a wing has to be rigid and strong and consequently may be heavy. By adding external bracing, the weight can be greatly reduced. Originally such bracing was always present, but it causes a large amount of drag at higher speeds and has not been used for faster designs since the early 1930s.

The types are:

- Cantilevered: self-supporting. All the structure is buried under the aerodynamic skin, giving a clean appearance with low drag.
- Braced: the wings are supported by external structural members. Nearly all multi-plane designs are braced. Some monoplanes, especially early designs such as the Fokker Eindecker, are also braced to save weight. Braced wings are of two types:
  - Strut-braced: one or more stiff struts help to support the wing, as on the Fokker D.VII. A strut may act in compression or tension at different points in the flight regime.
  - Wire-braced: alone (as on the Boeing P-26 Peashooter) or, more usually, in addition to struts, tension wires also help to support the wing. Unlike a strut, a wire can act only in tension.

Cantilever	Strut-braced	Wire-braced

A braced multiplane may have one or more "bays", which are the compartments created by adding interplane struts; the number of bays refers to one side of the aircraft's wing panels only. For example, the de Havilland Tiger Moth is a single-bay biplane where the Bristol F.2 Fighter is a two-bay biplane.

Single-bay biplane	Two-bay biplane

- Closed wing: two wing planes are merged or joined structurally at or near the tips in some way. This stiffens the structure and can reduce aerodynamic losses at the tips. Variants include:
  - Box wing: upper and lower planes are joined by a vertical fin between their tips. The first officially witnessed plane to take off and fly, the Santos-Dumont 14-bis, used this configuration. Tandem box wings have also been studied (see Joined wing description below).
  - Annular box wing: A type of box wing whose vertical fins curve continuously, blending smoothly into the wing tips. An early example was the Blériot III, which featured two annular wings in tandem.
  - Annular (cylindrical): the wing is shaped like a cylinder. The Coléoptère had concentric wing and fuselage. It took off and landed vertically, but never achieved transition to horizontal flight. Examples with the wing mounted on top of the fuselage have been proposed but never built.
  - Annular (planar): the wing is shaped like a disc with a hole in it. A number of Lee-Richards annular monoplanes flew shortly before the First World War.
  - Joined wing: a tandem-wing layout in which the front low wing sweeps back and/or the rear high wing sweeps forwards such that they join at or near the tips to form a continuous surface in a hollow diamond or triangle shape. The Ligeti Stratos is a rare example.
    - Rhomboidal wing: a joined wing consisting of four surfaces in a diamond arrangement. The Edwards Rhomboidal biplane of 1911 had both wings in the same plane but failed to fly.

Box wing	Annular box wing	Cylindrical wing	Joined wing

Flat annular wing	Rhomboidal wing

Wings can also be characterised as:

- Rigid: stiff enough to maintain the aerofoil profile in varying conditions of airflow. A rigid wing may have external bracing and/or a fabric covering.
- Flexible:
  - The surface may be flexible, typically a thin membrane. Requires external bracing and/or wind pressure to maintain the aerofoil shape. Common types include the Rogallo wing, parafoil and most kites.
  - An otherwise rigid structure may be designed to flex, either because it is inherently aeroelastic as in the aeroisoclinic wing, or because shape changes are actively introduced.

Rigid delta wing	Flexible Rogallo wing

== Planform ==
The wing planform is the silhouette of the wing when viewed from above or below.

See also variable geometry types which vary the wing planform during flight.

=== Aspect ratio ===
The aspect ratio is the span divided by the mean or average chord. It is a measure of how long and slender the wing appears when seen from above or below.

- Low aspect ratio: short and stubby wing. Structurally efficient, high instantaneous roll rate, low supersonic drag. They tend to be used on fighter aircraft, such as the Lockheed F-104 Starfighter, and on very high-speed aircraft including the North American X-15.
- Moderate aspect ratio: general-purpose wing, very widely used, for example on the Douglas DC-3 transport.
- High aspect ratio: long and slender wing. More efficient aerodynamically, having less induced drag at subsonic speeds. They tend to be used by high-altitude subsonic aircraft such as the Lockheed U-2 spy plane and by high-performance sailplanes such as the Glaser-Dirks DG-500.

Low aspect ratio	Moderate aspect ratio	High aspect ratio

Most variable-geometry configurations vary the aspect ratio in some way, either deliberately or as a side effect.

=== Chord variation along span ===
The wing chord may be varied along the span of the wing, for both structural and aerodynamic reasons.

- Constant chord: parallel leading & trailing edges. Simplest to make, and common where low cost is important, such as on the Piper J-3 Cub but inefficient as the outer section generates little lift while adding both weight and drag. Sometimes known in North America as the Hershey Bar wing due to its similarity in shape to a popular chocolate bar.
- Tapered: wing narrows towards the tip. Structurally and aerodynamically more efficient than a constant chord wing, and easier to make than the elliptical type.
  - Trapezoidal: a tapered wing with straight leading and trailing edges: may be unswept or swept. The straight tapered wing is one of the most common wing planforms, as seen on the Messerschmitt Bf 109.
  - Inverse or reverse tapered: wing is widest near the tip. Structurally inefficient, leading to high weight. Flown experimentally on the XF-91 Thunderceptor in an attempt to overcome the stall problems of swept wings.
  - Compound tapered: taper reverses towards the root. Typically braced to maintain stiffness. Used on the Westland Lysander army cooperation aircraft to increase visibility for the crew.
- Constant chord with tapered outer section: common variant seen for example on many Cessna types.

Constant chord	Tapered (trapezoidal)	Reverse tapered	Compound tapered	Constant chord, tapered outer

- Elliptical: leading and trailing edges are curved such that the chord length varies elliptically with respect to span. Sometimes mistakenly said to be the most efficient (in aerodynamics theory, the term "elliptical" describes the optimal lift distribution over a wing of given span and not its shape), and also difficult to make. Famously used on the Supermarine Spitfire.
  - Semi-elliptical: only the leading or trailing edge is elliptical with the other being straight, as with the elliptical trailing edges of the Seversky P-35.

Elliptical	Semi-elliptical

- Bird wing: a curved shape appearing similar to a bird's outstretched wing. Popular during the pioneer years, and achieved some success on the Etrich Taube where its planform was inspired by the zanonia (Alsomitra macrocarpa) seed.
- Bat wing: a form with radial ribs. The 1901 Whitehead No. 21 has been the subject of claims to the first controlled powered flight.
- Circular: approximately circular planform. The Vought V-173 used large propellers near the tips, which helped to counteract its strong wingtip vortices, and had an outboard tail plane for stability.
  - Flying saucer: circular flying wing. Inherently unstable, as the Avro Canada Avrocar demonstrated.
  - Disc wing: a variant in which the entire disc rotates. Popular on toys such as the Frisbee.
  - Flat annular wing: the circle has a hole in, forming a closed wing (see above). The Lee-Richards annular monoplanes flew shortly before the First World War.

Birdlike	Batlike	Circular	Flying saucer	Flat annular

- Delta: triangular planform with swept leading edge and straight trailing edge. Offers the advantages of a swept wing, with good structural efficiency and low frontal area. Disadvantages are the low wing loading and high wetted area needed to obtain aerodynamic stability. Variants are:
  - Tailless delta: a classic high-speed design, used for example in the Dassault Mirage III series.
  - Tailed delta: adds a conventional tailplane, to improve handling. Used on the Mikoyan-Gurevich MiG-21.
  - Cropped delta: wing tips are cut off. This helps avoid tip drag at high angles of attack. The Fairey Delta 1 also had a tail. At the extreme, merges into the "tapered swept" configuration.
  - Compound delta or double delta: inner section has a (usually) steeper leading edge sweep as on the Saab Draken. This improves the lift at high angles of attack and delays or prevents stalling. By contrast, the Saab Viggen has an inner section of reduced sweep to avoid interference from its canard foreplane.
  - Ogival delta: a smoothly blended "wineglass" double-curve encompassing the leading edges and tip of a cropped compound delta. Seen in tailless form on the Concorde supersonic transport.

Tailless delta	Tailed delta	Cropped delta	Compound delta	Ogival delta

=== Sweep ===
Wings may be swept back, or occasionally forwards, for a variety of reasons. A small degree of sweep is sometimes used to adjust the centre of lift when the wing cannot be attached in the ideal position for some reason, such as a pilot's visibility from the cockpit. Other uses are described below.

- Straight: extends at right angles to the line of flight. The most structurally-efficient wing, it has been common for low-speed designs since the very first days of the Wright Flyer.
- Swept back (aka "swept wing"): The wing sweeps rearwards from the root to the tip. In early tailless examples, such as the Dunne aircraft, this allowed the outer wing section to act like a conventional empennage (tail) to provide aerodynamic stability. At transonic speeds swept wings have lower drag, but can handle poorly in or near a stall and require high stiffness to avoid aeroelasticity at high speeds. Common on high-subsonic and early supersonic designs such as the Hawker Hunter.
- Forward swept: the wing angles forward from the root. Benefits are similar to backwards sweep, also it avoids the stall problems and has reduced tip losses allowing a smaller wing, but requires even greater stiffness to avoid aeroelastic flutter as on the Sukhoi Su-47. The HFB 320 Hansa Jet used forward sweep to prevent the wing spar passing through the cabin. Small shoulder-wing aircraft may use forward sweep to maintain a correct CoG.

Some types of variable geometry vary the wing sweep during flight:

- Swing-wing: also called "variable sweep wing". The left and right hand wings vary their sweep together, usually backwards. Seen in a few types of military aircraft, such as the General Dynamics F-111 Aardvark and the Grumman F-14 Tomcat.
- Oblique wing: a single full-span wing pivots about its midpoint, so that one side sweeps back and the other side sweeps forward. Flown on the NASA AD-1 research aircraft.

Straight	Swept	Forward swept	Variable sweep (swing-wing)	Variable-geometry oblique wing

=== Sweep variation along span ===
The angle of a swept wing may also be varied, or cranked, along the span:

- Crescent: wing outer section is swept less sharply than the inner section, to obtain a best compromise between transonic shock delay and spanwise flow control. Used on the Handley Page Victor.
- Cranked arrow: aerodynamically identical to the compound delta, but with the trailing edge also kinked inwards. Trialled experimentally on the General Dynamics F-16XL.
- M-wing: the inner wing section sweeps forward, and the outer section sweeps backwards. Allows the wing to be highly swept while minimising the undesirable effects of aeroelastic bending. Periodically studied, but never used on an aircraft.
- W-wing: A reversed M-wing. Proposed for the Blohm & Voss P.188 but studied even less than the M-wing and in the end never used.

Crescent	Cranked arrow	M-wing	W-wing

=== Asymmetrical ===
On a few asymmetrical aircraft the left and right hand sides are not mirror-images of each other:

- Asymmetric layout: the Blohm & Voss BV 141 had separate fuselage and crew nacelle offset on either side to give the crew a good field of view.
- Asymmetric span: on several Italian fighters such as the Ansaldo SVA, one wing was slightly longer than the other to help counteract engine torque.
- Oblique wing: one wing sweeps forward and the other back. The NASA AD-1 had a full-span wing structure with variable sweep.

Asymmetrical	Torque counteraction by asymmetric span	Variable-geometry oblique wing

== Tailplanes and foreplanes ==
The classic aerofoil section wing is unstable in pitch, and requires some form of horizontal stabilizing surface. Also it cannot provide any significant pitch control, requiring a separate control surface (elevator) mounted elsewhere - usually on the horizontal stabilizer.

- Conventional: "tailplane" surface at the rear of the aircraft, forming part of the tail or empennage. It did not become the convention for some years after the Wrights, with the Blériot VII of 1907 being the first successful example.
- Canard: "foreplane" surface at the front of the aircraft. Common in the pioneer years, but from the outbreak of World War I no production model appeared until the Saab Viggen in 1967.
- Tandem: two or more main wings, one behind the other. Both provide significant lift. An example is the Rutan Quickie. To provide longitudinal stability, the wings must differ in aerodynamic characteristics: typically the angle of incidence and/or the aerofoils chosen differ between the two wings. The wings on each side may meet at their tips to form a joined wing (see above).
- Three-surface: both conventional tail and canard auxiliary surfaces. Modern examples include the Sukhoi Su-33, while pioneer examples include the Voisin-Farman I.
- Outboard tail: split in two, with each half mounted on a short boom just behind and outboard of a wing tip. It comprises outboard horizontal stabilisers (OHS) and may or may not include additional boom-mounted vertical stabilisers (fins). In this position, the tail surfaces interact constructively with the wingtip vortices to significantly reduce drag. Used for the Scaled Composites SpaceShipOne.
- Tailless: no separate surface, at front or rear. The lifting and stabilizing surfaces may be combined in a single plane, as on the Short SB.4 Sherpa whose whole wing tip sections acted as elevons. Alternatively the aerofoil profile may be modified to provide inherent stability, as on the Dunne D.5. Aircraft having a tailplane but no vertical tail fin have also been described as "tailless".

Conventional tail	Canard	Tandem

Three surface	Outboard tail	Tailless

== Dihedral and anhedral ==
Angling the wings up or down spanwise from root to tip can help to resolve various design issues, such as stability and control in flight.

- Dihedral: the tips are higher than the root as on the Santos-Dumont 14-bis, giving a shallow 'V' shape when seen from the front. Adds lateral stability.
- Anhedral or catahedral: the tips are lower than the root, as on the first Wright Flyer; the opposite of dihedral. Used to reduce stability where some other feature results in too much stability.

Some biplanes have different degrees of dihedral/anhedral on different wings. The Sopwith Camel had a flat upper wing and dihedral on the lower wing, while the Hanriot HD-1 had dihedral on the upper wing but none on the lower.

Dihedral	Anhedral	Biplane with dihedral on both wings	Biplane with dihedral on lower wing

In a cranked or polyhedral wing the dihedral angle varies along the span. (Note that the description "cranked" varies in usage. See also Cranked arrow planform.)

- Gull wing: sharp dihedral on the wing root section, little or none on the main section, as on the PZL P.11 fighter. Sometimes used to improve visibility forwards and upwards and may be used as the upper wing on a biplane as on the Polikarpov I-153.
- Inverted gull wing: anhedral on the root section, dihedral on the main section. The opposite of a gull wing. May be used to reduce the length of wing-mounted undercarriage legs while allowing a raised fuselage, as on the German Junkers Ju 87 Stuka dive bomber.
- Cranked or canted tip: tip section dihedral differs from the main wing. The tips may have upwards dihedral as on the F-4 Phantom II or downwards anhedral as on the Northrop XP-56 Black Bullet.

Gull wing	Inverted gull wing	Dihedral tips	Anhedral tips

- The channel wing includes a section of the wing forming a partial duct around or immediately behind a propeller. Flown since 1942 in prototype form only, most notably on the Custer Channel Wing aircraft.

Channel wing

== Wings vs. bodies ==
Some designs have no clear join between wing and fuselage, or body. This may be because one or other of these is missing, or because they merge into each other:

- Flying wing: the aircraft has no distinct fuselage or horizontal tail (although fins and pods, blisters, etc. may be present) such as on the B-2 stealth bomber.
- Blended body or blended wing-body: a smooth transition occurs between wing and fuselage, with no hard dividing line. Reduces wetted area and can also reduce interference between airflow over the wing root and any adjacent body, in both cases reducing drag. The Lockheed SR-71 spyplane exemplifies this approach.
- Lifting body: the aircraft lacks identifiable wings but relies on the fuselage (usually at high speeds or high angles of attack) to provide aerodynamic lift as on the X-24.

Flying wing	Blended body	Lifting body

Some designs may fall into multiple categories depending on interpretation, for example many UAVs or drones can be seen either as a tailless blended wing-body or as a flying wing with a deep centre chord.

== Variable geometry ==
A variable geometry aircraft is able to change its physical configuration during flight.

Some types of variable geometry craft transition between fixed wing and rotary wing configurations. For more about these hybrids, see powered lift.

=== Variable planform ===
- Variable-sweep wing or Swing-wing. The left and right hand wings vary their sweep together, usually backwards. The first successful wing sweep in flight was carried out by the Bell X-5 in the early 1950s. In the Beech Starship, only the canard foreplanes have variable sweep.
- Oblique wing: a single full-span wing pivots about its midpoint, as used on the NASA AD-1, so that one side sweeps back and the other side sweeps forward.
- Telescoping wing: the outer section of wing telescopes over or within the inner section of wing, varying span, aspect ratio and wing area, as used on the FS-29 TF glider.
- Detachable wing. The WS110A study proposed a long wing for subsonic takeoff and cruise, which then detached the outer panels to drop away, leaving a short-span wing for supersonic flight. (See also Slip wing below.)
- Extending wing or expanding wing: part of the wing retracts into the main aircraft structure to reduce drag and low-altitude buffet for high-speed flight, and is extended only for takeoff, low-speed cruise and landing. The Gérin Varivol biplane, which flew in 1936, extended the leading and trailing edges to increase wing area.

Variable sweep (swing-wing)	Variable-geometry oblique wing	Telescoping wing	Extending wing

- Folding wing: part of the wing extends for takeoff and landing, and folds away for high-speed flight. The outer sections of the XB-70 Valkyrie wing folded down to enhance compression lift and directional stability during supersonic cruise. (Many aircraft have wings that may be folded for storage on the ground or onboard ship; these are not folding wings in the sense used here.)

Folding wing

=== Variable section ===
- Variable incidence: the wing plane can tilt upwards or downwards relative to the fuselage. The wing on the Vought F-8 Crusader was rotated, lifting the leading edge on takeoff to improve performance. If powered prop-rotors are fitted to the wing to allow vertical takeoff or STOVL performance, at extreme angles it merges into the Convertiplane class.
- Variable camber: the leading and/or trailing edge sections of the whole wing pivot to increase the effective camber of the wing and sometimes also its area. This enhances manoeuvrability. An early example was flown on the Westland N.16 of 1917.
- Variable thickness: the upper wing centre section can be raised to increase wing thickness and camber for landing and take-off, and reduced for high speed. Charles Rocheville and others flew some experimental aircraft.
- Adaptive compliant wing: an adaptive compliant wing may be capable of varying span, sweep, chord length, dihedral, twist, camber, and thickness, as seen on NASA's Advanced Fighter Technology Integration (AFTI) Program F-111.

Variable incidence wing	Variable camber aerofoil	Variable thickness aerofoil

=== Polymorphism ===
A polymorphic wing is able to change the number of wings in flight. The Nikitin-Shevchenko IS "folding fighter" prototypes were able to morph between biplane and monoplane configurations after takeoff by folding the lower wing up into a cavity in the underside of the upper wing.

The slip wing is a variation on the polymorphic idea, in which a low-wing monoplane is fitted with a second detachable "slip" wing above it to assist takeoff. The upper wing is then released and discarded once in the air. The idea was first flown on the experimental Hillson Bi-mono.

Polymorphic wing	Slip wing

== Minor independent surfaces ==
Various minor surfaces

Aircraft may have additional minor aerodynamic surfaces. Some of these are treated as part of the overall wing configuration:

- Winglet: a small fin at the wingtip, usually turned upwards. Reduces the size of vortices shed by the wingtip, and hence also tip drag.
- Strake: a small surface, typically longer than it is wide and mounted on the fuselage. Strakes may be located at various positions in order to improve aerodynamic behaviour. Leading edge root extensions (LERX) are also sometimes referred to as wing strakes.
- Chine: sharp-edged profile running along the fuselage. When used aerodynamically it is extended outwards to form a lifting surface, typically blending into the main wing. As well as improving low speed (high angle of attack) handling, provides extra lift at high supersonic speeds for minimal increase in drag. Seen on the Lockheed SR-71 Blackbird.
- Moustache: small high-aspect-ratio canard surface having no movable control surface. Typically is retractable for high speed flight. Deflects air downward onto the wing root, to delay the stall. Seen on the Dassault Milan.

== Additional minor features ==
Additional minor features may be applied to an existing aerodynamic surface such as the main wing:

=== High lift ===
High-lift devices

High-lift devices maintain lift at low speeds and delay the stall to allow slower takeoff and landing speeds:

- Slat and slot: a leading-edge slat is a small aerofoil extending in front of the main leading edge. The spanwise gap behind it forms a leading-edge slot. Air flowing up through the slot is deflected backwards by the slat to flow over the wing, allowing the aircraft to fly at lower air speeds without flow separation or stalling. A slat may be fixed or retractable.
- Flap: a hinged aerodynamic surface, usually on the trailing edge, which is rotated downwards to generate extra lift and drag. Variations include plain, slotted, and split flaps. Some, such as Fowler Flaps, also extend rearwards to increase wing area. The Krueger flap is a leading-edge device.
- Cuff: an extension to the leading edge which modifies the aerofoil section, typically to improve low-speed characteristics.

=== Spanwise flow control ===
Spanwise flow control device

On a swept wing, air tends to flow sideways as well as backwards and reducing this can improve the efficiency of the wing:

- Wing fence: a flat plate extending along the wing chord and for a short distance vertically. Used to control spanwise airflow over the wing.
- Dogtooth leading edge: creates a sharp discontinuity in the airflow over the wing, disrupting spanwise flow.
- Notched leading edge: acts like a dogtooth.

=== Vortex creation ===
Vortex devices

Vortex devices maintain airflow at low speeds and delay the stall, by creating a vortex which re-energises the boundary layer close to the wing.

- Vortex generator: small triangular protrusion on the upper leading wing surface; usually, several are spaced along the span of the wing. Vortex generators create additional drag at all speeds.
- Vortilon: a flat plate attached to the underside of the wing near its outer leading edge, roughly parallel to normal airflow. At low speeds, tip effects cause a local spanwise flow which is deflected by the vortilon to form a vortex passing up and over the wing.
- Leading-edge root extension (LERX): generates a strong vortex over the wing at high angles of attack, but unlike vortex generators it can also increase lift at such high angles, while creating minimal drag in level flight.

=== Drag reduction ===
Drag-reduction devices

- Anti-shock body: a streamlined pod shape added to the leading or trailing edge of an aerodynamic surface, to delay the onset of shock stall and reduce transonic wave drag. Sometimes called a Küchemann carrot.
- Fairings of various kinds, such as blisters, pylons and wingtip pods, containing equipment which cannot fit inside the wing, and whose only aerodynamic purpose is to reduce the drag created by the equipment.
- Fillet, a type of fairing: a small curved infill at the junction of two surfaces, such as a wing and fuselage, blending them smoothly together to reduce drag.

== See also ==
- Wing § Design features
- Aircraft design process
