= Ellingston Special =

American variable-geometry aircraft

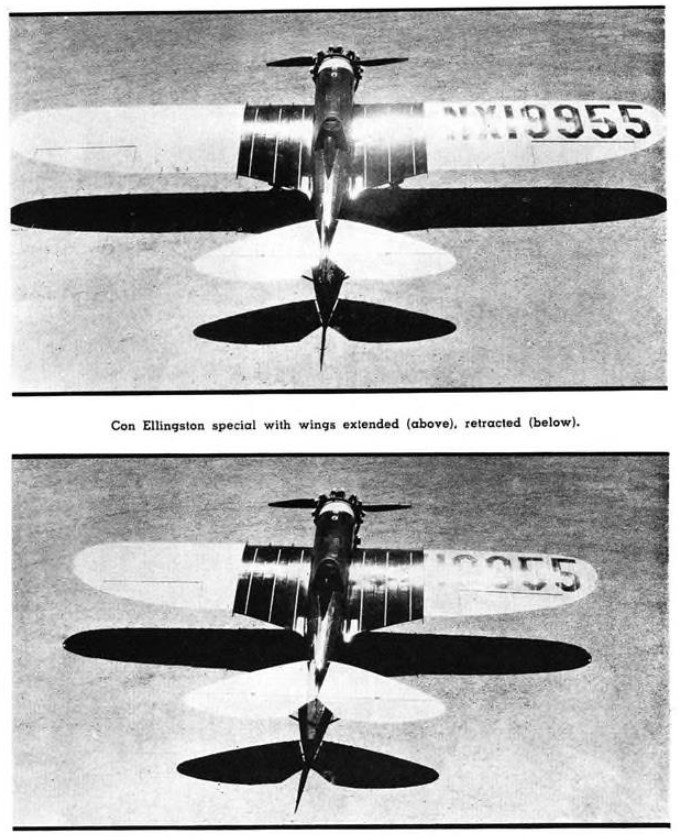
- Ellingston retractable wing monoplane

General information
- Type: Experimental aircraft
- National origin: United States
- Designer: Cornwallis "Con" Ellingston
- Number built: 1

History
- First flight: April 23, 1938

The Ellingston Special was a variable-geometry aircraft, designed by Cornwallis "Con" Ellingston of Great Falls, Montana in the late 1930s.

== Background ==
Ellingston, together with Earle Hansen, constructed the aircraft, with Hansen making the maiden flight on April 23, 1938. It was a single-seat low-wing monoplane, fitted with a retractable undercarriage, and was powered by a 70 hp (52 kW) LeBlond 90-7D radial engine, fitted with a two-bladed tractor propeller. The primary structure was constructed from 4130 chromoly steel tubing.

The aircraft's most notable feature was its telescopic wings, which could vary in span between 25 ft (7.6 m) and 32 ft (9.8 m), with it being possible to vary the wingspan while in flight. The maximum speed of the aircraft varied from 165 mph (266 km/h) with the wings retracted, to 110 mph (180 km/h) with the wings extended.

An article in the December 1939 issue of Popular Aviation magazine stated that Ellingston was working on a twin-engined transport aircraft, which would also incorporate variable span, construction of which was scheduled to begin that winter.

== Specifications (Special) ==
Data from Popular Aviation

General characteristics

- Crew: 1
- Wingspan: 25 ft (7.6 m) (wings retracted)
  32 ft (9.8 m) (wings extended)
- Airfoil: Clark Y
- Powerplant: 1 × LeBlond 90-7D air-cool radial piston, 90 hp (67 kW)
- Propellers: 2-bladed

Performance

- Maximum speed: 165 mph (266 km/h, 143 kn) (wings retracted) 110 mph (180 km/h) (wings extended)
- Stall speed: 65 mph (105 km/h, 56 kn) (wings retracted) 40 mph (64 km/h) (wings extended)

== See also ==
Aircraft of comparable role, configuration, and era

- Makhonine Mak-10
- Nikitin-Shevchenko IS
- Schmeidler SN.2
- Stemal III
