= Nikitin-Shevchenko IS =

Soviet prototype aircraft

IS

General information
- Type: Polymorphic Fighter
- National origin: USSR
- Manufacturer: Nikitin
- Designer: Vasilii Vasilyevich Nikitin & Vladimir Vasilyevich Schyevchyenko
- Number built: 2

History
- First flight: 6 November 1940

The Nikitin-Schyevchyenko IS series (Russian: Истребитель складной, romanized: Istrebitel skladnoi, meaning "folding fighter"), were single seat polymorphic fighters designed and prototyped in the USSR from 1938.

== Development ==
Nikitin's test pilot, Vladimir Vasiloyevich Schyevchyenko, investigated the practicality of a biplane fighter with a folding lower wing which retracted into the upper wing. The intention being to combine the short field length and climb capabilities of the biplane with the speed of the monoplane fighter. Assisted by Nikitin in his investigation, Schyevchyenko built a scale model at MAT in 1939. Later in 1939 OKB-30 were tasked with the design and manufacture of the full-scale IS, which was completed by 6 November 1940.

The fuselage forward of the cockpit, wing spar booms and the combined lower inner wing and undercarriage assemblies were built up from welded 30KhGSA steel tubing, whilst the rest of the airframe was constructed from D16 duralumin throughout except for fabric covering on the control surfaces.

The pneumatically actuated inwards retracting undercarriage was housed inside the inner lower-wing which folded at approx ½ span to lie in recesses in the sides of the fuselage. The outer halves of the lower wings remained horizontal as the wings retracted and were housed in recesses in the under-surfaces of the upper wings. Retraction of the wings was carried out by a single vertically mounted pneumatic actuator in the fuselage which unlocked the bracing struts either side and pulled the wing upwards as the bracing strut was pulled upwards.

Control of the undercarriage retraction and wing folding was accomplished with a single three position lever in the cockpit. With 'Chassis Down' selected the wing and undercarriage were extended, selecting 'Chassis Up/Wing Down' retracted the undercarriage into the inner lower wing, and selecting 'Wing Up' retracted the wing, selection of wing position could be made at any time to enable the pilot to choose the best configuration for the situation the aircraft was in.

Flight tests were successful but the performance of the monoplane configuration was inferior to the contemporary monoplane fighters such as the MiG-3 and Yak-1. A second machine was built fitted with a more powerful engine but flight tests were interrupted by the German invasion in 1941. Even more powerful versions were designed with AM-120 or AM-37 engines, however the invasion forced abandonment of the concept.

== Variants ==
- IS-1 – Initial prototype with M-63 (Ash-63) factory tests completed, LII flight test carried out by G.M. Shiyanov, armed with 4x ShKAS in the roots of the upper main-plane, synchronised to fire through the propeller.
- IS-2 – The second airframe with improvements and M-88 engine in a long-chord NACA cowling, armed with 2x BS and 2x ShKAS.
- IS-3 – Projected version, no information available.
- IS-4 – Final design version with AM-120 or AM-37 engine, refined aerodynamics and tricycle undercarriage.

== Specifications (IS-1) ==
Data from Gunston, Bill. "Encyclopedia of Russian Aircraft 1875-1995". London:Osprey. 1995. ISBN 1-85532-405-9

General characteristics

- Crew: 1
- Length: 6.79 m (22 ft 2.33 in)
- Wingspan: 8.6 m (28 ft 2.5 in)
- Wing area: 20.83 m^{2} (224 sq ft)
- Empty weight: 1,400 kg (3,086 lb)
- Gross weight: 2,300 kg (5,070 lb)
- Powerplant: 1 × M-63 , 820.27 kW (1,100 hp)

Performance

- Maximum speed: 453 km/h (281 mph, 244 kn)
- Range: 600 km (372.8 mi, 324.0 nmi)
- Service ceiling: 8,800 m (28,870 ft)
- Rate of climb: 10.16 m/s (2,000.5 ft/min)

Armament

- 4 x 7.62mm ShKAS machine guns in upper wing roots synchronised to fire through propeller disc.

== See also ==
Aircraft of comparable role, configuration, and era

- Hillson Bi-mono
- Ellingston Special
- Makhonine Mak-10
- Polikarpov I-153
- Polikarpov I-16
- Schmeidler SN.2
- Stemal III

Related lists list of aircraft

== Bibliography ==
- Green, William and Gordon Swanborough. "Ingenious and Innovative, but...! The 'Folding Fighters' of the 'Forties". Air Enthusiast Quarterly, No. 2, n.d., pp. 186–190. ISSN 0143-5450
- Gunston, Bill. "Encyclopaedia of Russian Aircraft 1875-1995". London:Osprey. 1995. ISBN 1-85532-405-9

http://issuu.com/jeanlulu/docs/-aviation--soviet-x-planes--yefim-gordon---bill-gu
