= Schmeidler SN.2 =

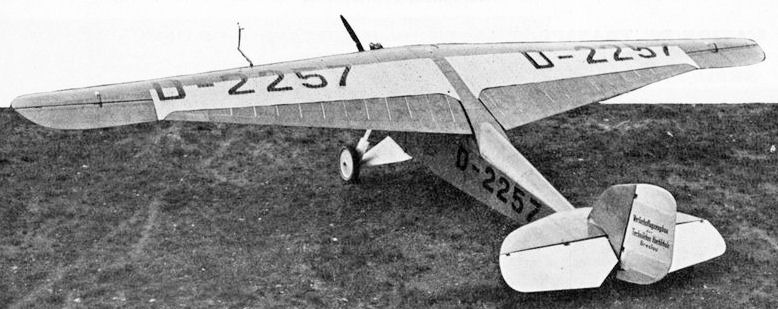

General information
- Type: Experimental variable wing area aircraft
- National origin: Germany
- Manufacturer: Technische Hochschule Breslau
- Designer: Werner Schmeidler, Neumann
- Number built: 1

History
- First flight: 12 January 1932

The Schmeidler SN.2 was a low power, single seat aircraft designed in Germany in the 1930s to test the ability of trailing edge wing extensions to lower minimum flight speeds without a high speed drag penalty.

== Design ==
In the 1930s there was considerable interest in extending the speed range of aircraft. Slower level flight requires either larger area wings or airfoils with higher lift coefficients, the latter achieved either with higher angles of attack or greater camber. Combinations of these approaches could be used, as by modern camber and area increasing multipart flaps. The Makhonine Mak-10 was a 1931 example of pure area increase by wing extension but the 1932 Schmeidler SN.2 increased both area and camber with chord extension. It was designed and built by Werner Schmeidler and Neumann, both at the Breslau Technical College, now the Wrocław University of Technology. It was the second aircraft with area increasing wings built by them, hence the SN.2 designation, though this is not used in any of the pre-war journals cited here; nothing is known of its predecessor.

Apart from its variable wing trailing edge, the SN.2 was a conventional, single engine cantilever high wing monoplane. The straight leading edge of its wing was swept to semi-elliptical tips and the unextended trailing edge was also straight but without sweep. It had unusually short and broad slotted ailerons which reached behind the trailing edge. The fixed part of the wing had the popular, thick (15%) flat-bottomed Göttingen 387 airfoil with room within it for the extension, which had a right angle triangular plan and circular arc profile. When retracted, its rear edge protruded slightly out of the slot in the trailing edge of the fixed section. At its root, which was supported in a groove in the narrow, central upper fuselage, it increased the chord by about 35%; overall it added 20% to the wing area and increased the camber. It was controlled with a ratchet-restrained lever in the cockpit which was linked to fuselage mounted gears that engaged with racks on the moving surfaces.

The SN.2 was powered by a 34 kW (45 hp) BMW X five cylinder radial engine mounted with its cylinder heads projecting through a domed cowling. Behind the engine the fuselage was flat sided with the pilot under the wing leading edge in an enclosed single seat cabin. Aft, the central, wing bearing section behind the fixed wing trailing edge dropped away to a five sided structure with a ridged upper surface. At the rear the empennage was conventional, with a roughly semi-circular tailplane mounted on top of the fuselage, a little ahead of a similarly shaped fin. Both fixed surfaces carried broad, unbalanced control surfaces, with the rudder, which extended to the keel, operating within an elevator cut-out.

Its landing gear was of the fixed, conventional tailwheel type. Each mainwheel was mounted on a faired-in pair of V-strut pairs with a tall, inward leaning shock absorber strut from the axle to the wing root. Later on this was replaced by a vertical shock absorber strut to the wing underside. At the rear the tailskid was vertically sprung.

Flown by Wolf Hirth, the SN.2 flew for the first time on 12 January 1932 from Breslau. By March tests showed that opening the wing fully shortened take-off distance by a factor of two. In May it flew to Berlin where it was demonstrated in flight at Tempelhof. It was on static display at the DELA exhibition of sports aircraft held in Berlin for most of October 1932, registered as D-2257. It remained in action until at least 1934, when it moved to the new, all letter, civil registration scheme as D-YRON.

== Specifications ==
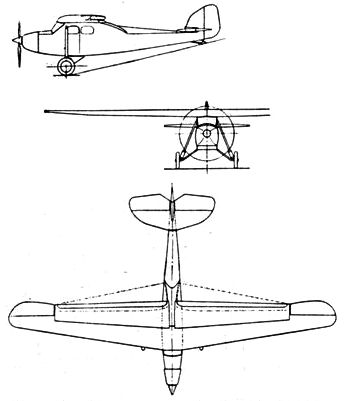
Schmeidler SN.2 3-view drawing from L'Aerophile February 1933

Data from General: L'Aérophile February 1933 Performance: Flugsport March 1932, Flugzeug-Typenbuch 1944

General characteristics

- Crew: 1
- Length: 6.20 m (20 ft 4 in)
- Wingspan: 11.40 m (37 ft 5 in)
- Height: 2 m (6 ft 7 in)
- Wing area: 12.75 m^{2} (137.2 sq ft) maximum, 15.25 m^{2} (164.1 sq ft)
- Airfoil: Göttingen 387 (fixed part of wing)
- Empty weight: 355 kg (783 lb) equipped
- Gross weight: 470 kg (1,036 lb)
- Fuel capacity: 44 L (12 US gal; 9.7 imp gal) fuel; 10 L (2.6 US gal; 2.2 imp gal) oil
- Powerplant: 1 × BMW X five cylinder radial 45 PS (44 hp; 33 kW)
- Propellers: 2-bladed metal fixed-pitch propeller, 1.9 m (6 ft 3 in) diameter

Performance

- Maximum speed: 160 km/h (99 mph, 86 kn) wing extensions retracted

130 km/h (81 mph; 70 kn) wing extensions extended

- Take-off speed: 72 km/h (45 mph; 39 kn)
- Landing speed: 88 km/h (55 mph; 48 kn) wing extensions retracted

44 km/h (27 mph; 24 kn) wing extensions extended

- Range: 300 km (190 mi, 160 nmi)
- Endurance: 2 hours
- Service ceiling: 2,930 m (9,610 ft) wing extensions retracted

3,490 m (11,450 ft) wing extensions extended

- Rate of climb: 1.7 m/s (330 ft/min) wing extensions retracted

2.5 m/s (8 ft/s) wing extensions extended

- Wing loading: 42.5 kg/m^{2} (8.7 lb/sq ft) wing extensions retracted

32.2 kg/m^{2} (7 lb/sq ft) wing extensions extended

- Power/mass: 0.909 PS/kg (0.407 hp/lb; 0.669 kW/kg)
- Take-off distance into wind, minimum wing extension: 140 m (460 ft)
- Take-off distance into wind, maximum wing extension: 70 m (230 ft)
- Landing run, minimum wing extension: 100 m (328 ft)
- Landing run, maximum wing extension: 50 m (164 ft)

== See also ==
Aircraft of comparable role, configuration, and era

- Ellingston Special
- Makhonine Mak-10
- Nikitin-Shevchenko IS
- Stemal III
