= Makhonine Mak-10 =

Mak-10
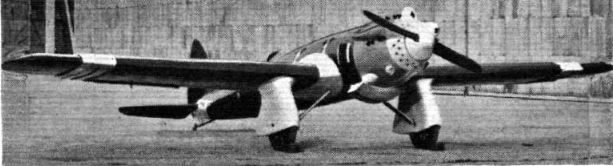
- Mak-10 with wings almost completely retracted

General information
- Type: Experimental aircraft
- National origin: France
- Designer: Ivan Makhonine
- Number built: 1

History
- First flight: 11 August 1931

The Makhonine Mak-10, was a variable-geometry research aircraft, built to investigate variable area / telescopic wings during 1931 in France.

== Design and development ==
In the early 1930s several designers became interested in the possibility of changing the configuration of wings between take off and fast flight. Two routes were explored, the first primarily involving camber and hence lift coefficient reduction and the other a decrease of wing area by span reduction at high speed. The Schmeidler variable wing and that of the Gloster built Antoni-Breda Ba.15 were examples of the first group and the Makhonine Mak-10 of the second.

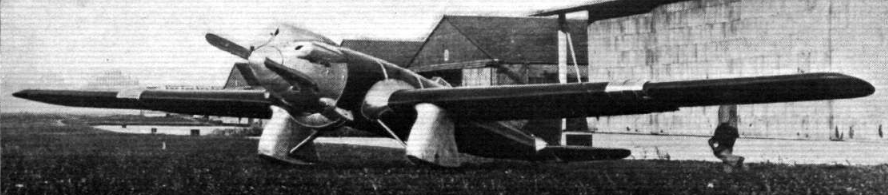
With wings completely extended

Details of the Mak-10 are sparse but its novel feature was a telescopic wing which increased the span for take-off by 8 m (26 ft 3 in) or 60% of its high speed configuration. The outer panels retracted into the central ones, their inner ends supported on bearings rolling along one or more spars. The ends of the centre section were reinforced with cuffs. The wing apart, it was a conventional cantilever low wing monoplane, with twin open cockpits, the rear one sometimes faired in, and faired, fixed landing gear. It was powered by a 480 kW (644 hp), three bank, W-configuration, twelve cylinder Lorraine 12Eb engine.

The first flight of the Mak-10 was on 11 August 1931. During four years of development the Mak-10 was re-engined with a 600 kW (800 hp) Gnome-Rhône 14K Mistral Major fourteen cylinder, two row radial engine which gave it a top speed of 380 km/h (240 mph) and the new designation Mak-101.

44 years later, the Akaflieg Stuttgart FS-29 experimental high performance sailplane also used telescopic wings to optimise both low speed thermalling and high speed penetration performance without the added induced drag of camber and area changing flaps.

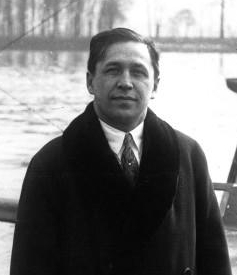
Ivan (Jean) Makhonine (Махонин Иван)

== Variants ==
Mak-10
480 kW (644 hp) W-configuration, twelve cylinder Lorraine 12Eb engine.
Mak-101
600 kW (800 hp) Gnome-Rhône 14K Mistral Major fourteen cylinder radial engine.

== Specifications (Mak-10) ==
Data from Parmentier

General characteristics

- Crew: 2
- Wingspan: 13 m (42 ft 8 in) retracted
  21 m (69 ft) extended
- Wing area: 21 m^{2} (230 sq ft) retracted
  33 m^{2} (360 sq ft) extended
- Gross weight: 5,000 kg (11,023 lb)
- Powerplant: 1 × Lorraine 12Eb W-12 water-cooled piston engine, 360 kW (480 hp)
- Propellers: 2-bladed

Performance

- Maximum speed: 300 km/h (190 mph, 160 kn)

== See also ==
Aircraft of comparable role, configuration, and era

- Ellingston Special
- Nikitin-Shevchenko IS
- Schmeidler SN.2
- Stemal III

== Bibliography ==
- Cortet, Pierre (December 1998). "Courrier des Lecteurs" [Readers' Letters]. Avions: Toute l'aéronautique et son histoire (in French) (69): 31–32. ISSN 1243-8650.
