= Strake (aeronautics) =

Flight control surface

Nose, wing and ventral strakes

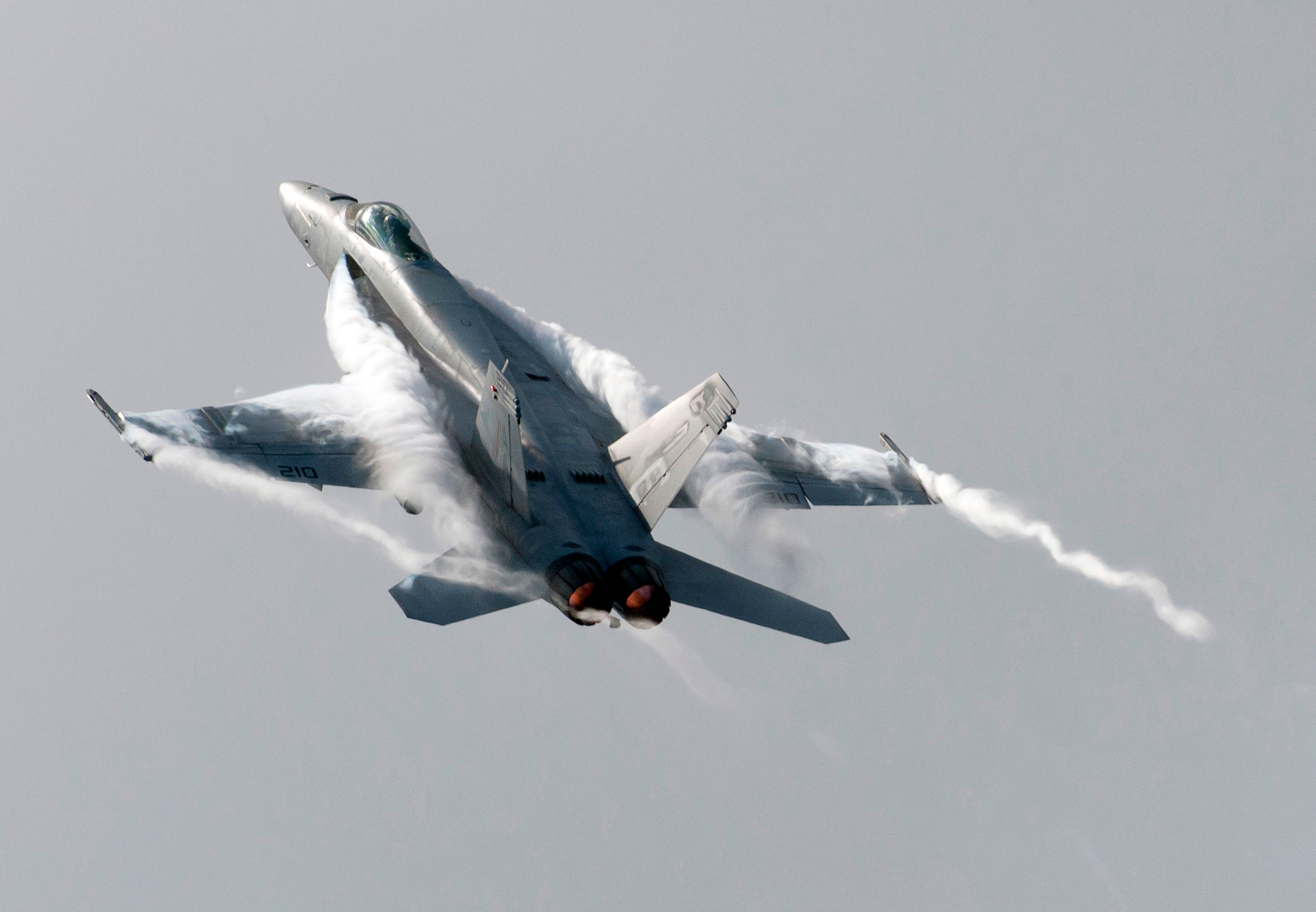
Vortices over the wing strakes of an F/A-18E Super Hornet

In aviation, a strake is an aerodynamic surface generally mounted on the fuselage of an aircraft to improve the flight characteristics either by controlling the airflow (acting as large vortex generators) or by a simple stabilising effect.

In general a strake is longer than it is wide, in contrast to a winglet or a moustache.

Leading edge root extensions (LERX) are also sometimes referred to as wing strakes.

== Nose strakes ==
On both supersonic and subsonic types, smaller strakes are sometimes applied to the forward fuselage to control the fuselage flow at high angles of attack; for example, the Concorde had small nose strakes "to get a better directional stability".

== Wing strakes ==
Double delta wing aircraft (Concorde, Tupolev Tu-144, Boeing 2707 and Lockheed L-2000 SST projects) featured a forward extended leading edge that may be considered as a wing strake; it provides the same additional vortex lift at high angle of attack by leading edge suction.

== Nacelle strakes ==
On jet aircraft where the engines are mounted in nacelles slung under the wings, strakes may be added to one or both sides of each nacelle to produce vortices that energize the airflow over the wings in times of high angle of attack, such as during takeoff and landing, thus improving wing effectiveness.

== Ventral strakes ==
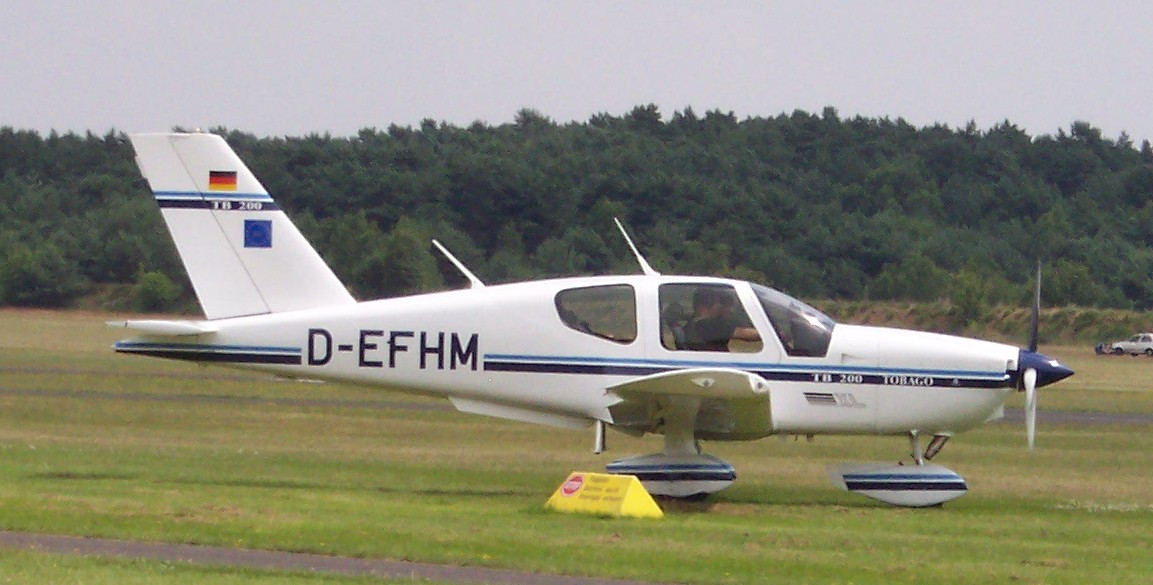
Socata TB-200 ventral strakes

One or two ventral strakes are sometimes positioned under the fuselage, as large vortex generators, to provide a better tail surfaces efficiency. Typical examples can be seen on the SOCATA TB family or the Lockheed F-104 Starfighter.

== Rear strakes—tail fins ==
One or two large fins or strakes are sometimes positioned under the rear fuselage or below the empennage, to provide adequate stability at high angles of attack when the tail fin is shielded from the main airstream by the fuselage and/or the wing wake. Typical examples can be seen on the Piaggio P.180 Avanti, Learjet 60 and Beechcraft 1900D.

The Grumman X-29 research aircraft had rear fuselage lateral fins or "Tail fins", sometimes called strakes, continuous with the trailing edge of the main wing. This allowed the positioning of a rear control surface at the end of each fin. Together with the main and forward (canard) wing control surfaces, this effectively gave it a three-surface configuration.

=== Anti-spin strakes ===
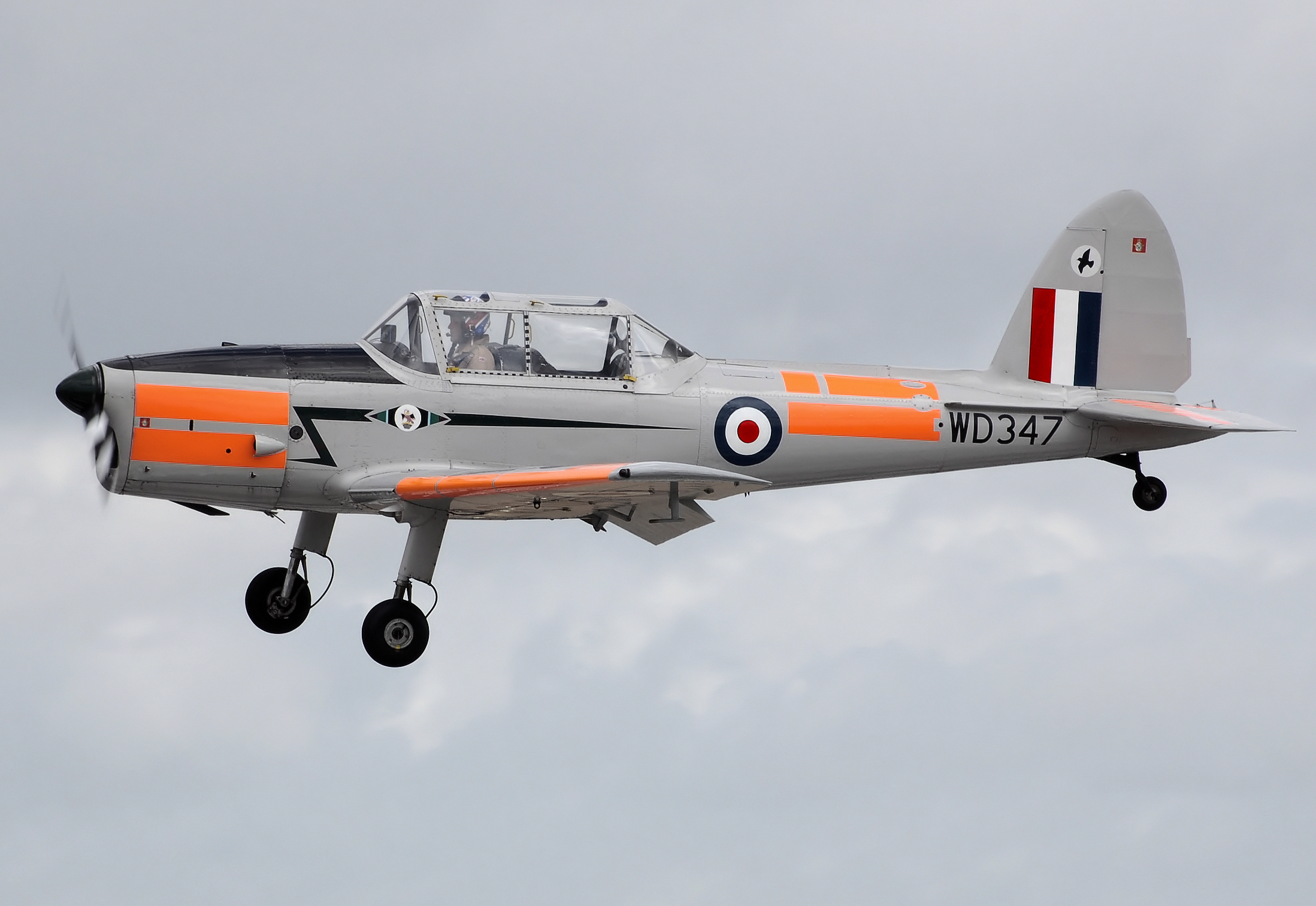
Spin strakes on DHC-1 Chipmunk

Anti-spin leading edge strakes, or spin strakes, or antispin fillet may be placed at the tailplane roots of generally aerobatic aircraft, such as the de Havilland Tiger Moth (British version), Scottish Aviation Bulldog, and de Havilland Canada DHC-1 Chipmunk. Ventral or dorsal fins increasing the directional stability are also used as anti-spin devices.

Shortly after the WWII introduction of the D variant of the North American P-51 Mustang fighter, with its bubble canopy for improved pilot visibility, a dorsal fillet or strake was added to the front of the vertical stabilizer fin in order to strengthen the tail empennage and to improve lateral stability in the yaw axis.

== Munitions ==
Certain air-deployed munitions, particularly "dumb" or unguided 500-pound (230 kg) bombs, are often retrofitted with bolt-on strake sets. Designed as an open collar with strakes fitted to the outside face, these strake sets are used to alter and normalize the aerodynamics of the weapon, yielding greater accuracy. As most such munitions were manufactured with only tail-mounted stabilizer fins, the addition of longitudinal strakes proves a much cleaner flow of air around the weapon during its glide, reducing the tendency to yaw and improving terminal accuracy.

Strakes are also often found on "smart" or guided munitions as an aid to the guidance system. By stabilizing the slipstream of air traveling over the weapon, the actions of control surfaces are much more predictable and precise, again improving the accuracy of the weapon.

== See also ==
- Index of aviation articles
- Chine (aeronautics)
- Leading edge extension
- Vortex generator
