= Leading edge =

Part of the wing that contacts the air first

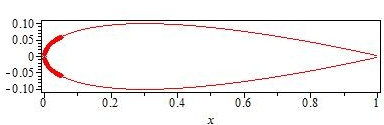
Cross section of an aerodynamic surface with the leading edge emphasised

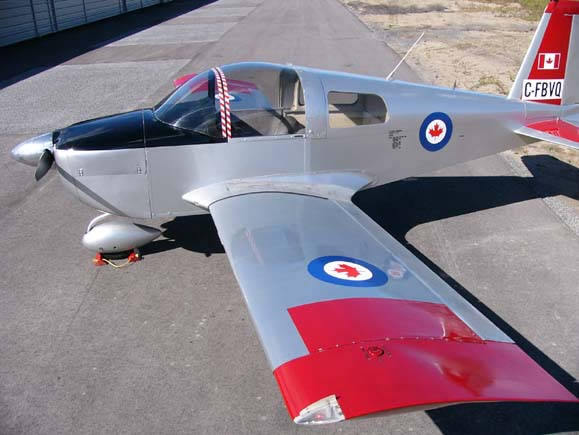
American Aviation AA-1 Yankee showing the wing's straight leading edge

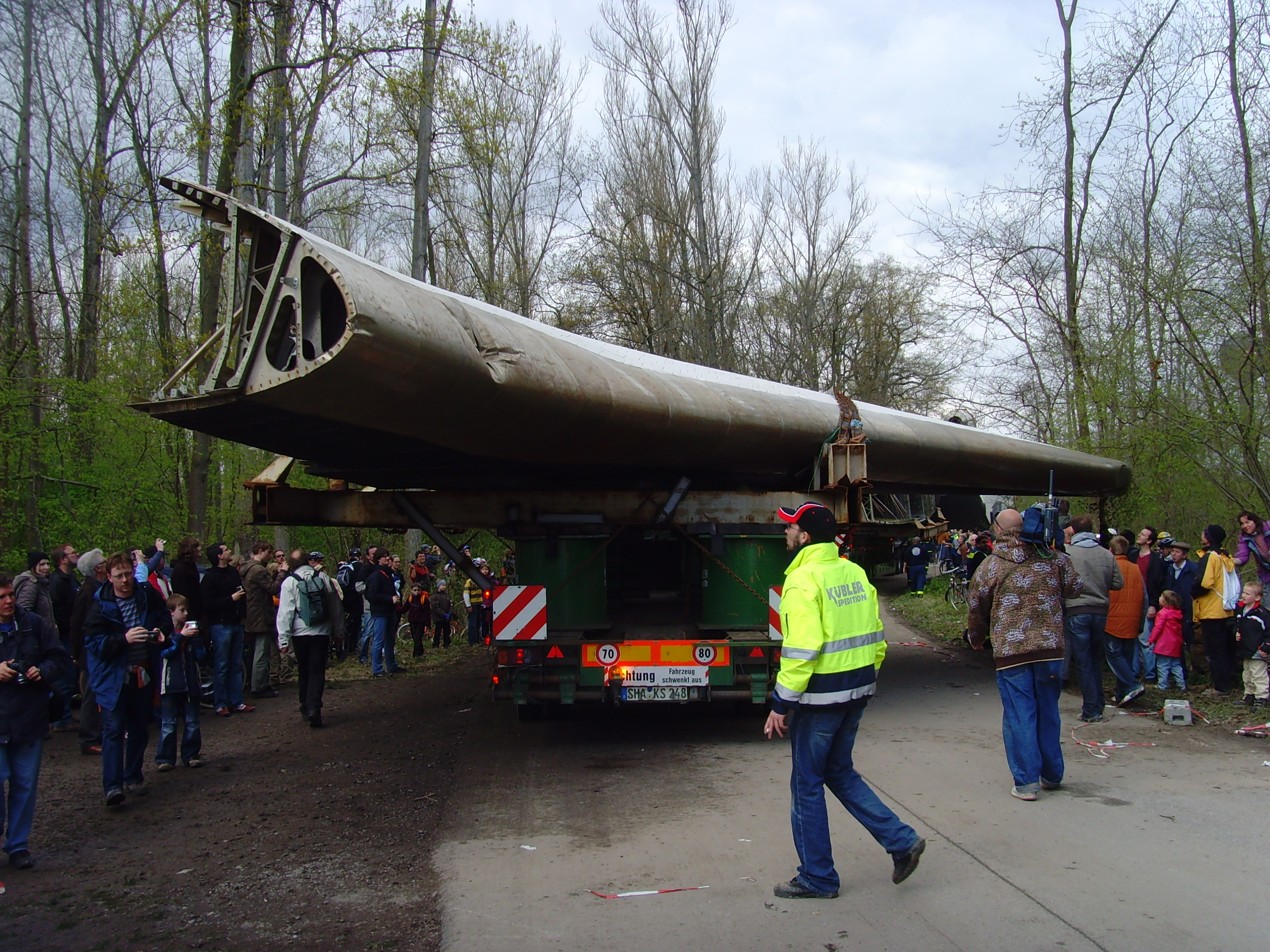
The leading edge of the Buran space shuttle transported to the Technik Museum Speyer

The leading edge is the part of the wing that first contacts the air; alternatively it is the foremost edge of an airfoil section. The first is an aerodynamic definition, the second a structural one.

As an example of the distinction, during a tailslide, from an aerodynamic point of view, the trailing edge becomes the leading edge and vice versa but from a structural point of view the leading edge remains unchanged.

== Overview ==
The structural leading edge may be equipped with one or more of the following:

- Leading edge boots
- Leading edge cuffs
- Leading edge extensions
- Leading edge slats
- Leading edge slots
- Krueger flaps
- Stall strips
- Vortex generators.

Associated terms are leading edge radius and leading edge stagnation point.

Seen in plan the leading edge may be straight or curved. A straight leading edge may be swept or unswept, the latter meaning that it is perpendicular to the longitudinal axis of the aircraft. As wing sweep is conventionally measured at the 25% chord line an unswept wing may have a swept or tapered leading edge. Some aircraft, like the General Dynamics F-111, have swing-wings where the sweep of both wing and leading edge can be varied.

In high-speed aircraft, compression heating of the air ahead of the wings can cause extreme heating of the leading edge. Heating was a major contributor to the destruction of the Space Shuttle Columbia during re-entry on February 1, 2003.

== Sail boats ==
When sailing into the wind, the dynamics that propel a sailboat forward are the same that create lift for an airplane. The term leading edge refers to the part of the sail that first contacts the wind. A fine tapered leading edge that does not disturb the flow is desirable since 90% of the drag on a sailboat owing to sails is a result of vortex shedding from the edges of the sail. Sailboats utilize a mast to support the sail. To help reduce the drag and poor net sail performance, designers have experimented with masts that are more aerodynamically shaped, rotating masts, wing masts, or placed the mast behind the sails as in the mast aft rig.
