= Jettison (aviation) =

Aviation procedure

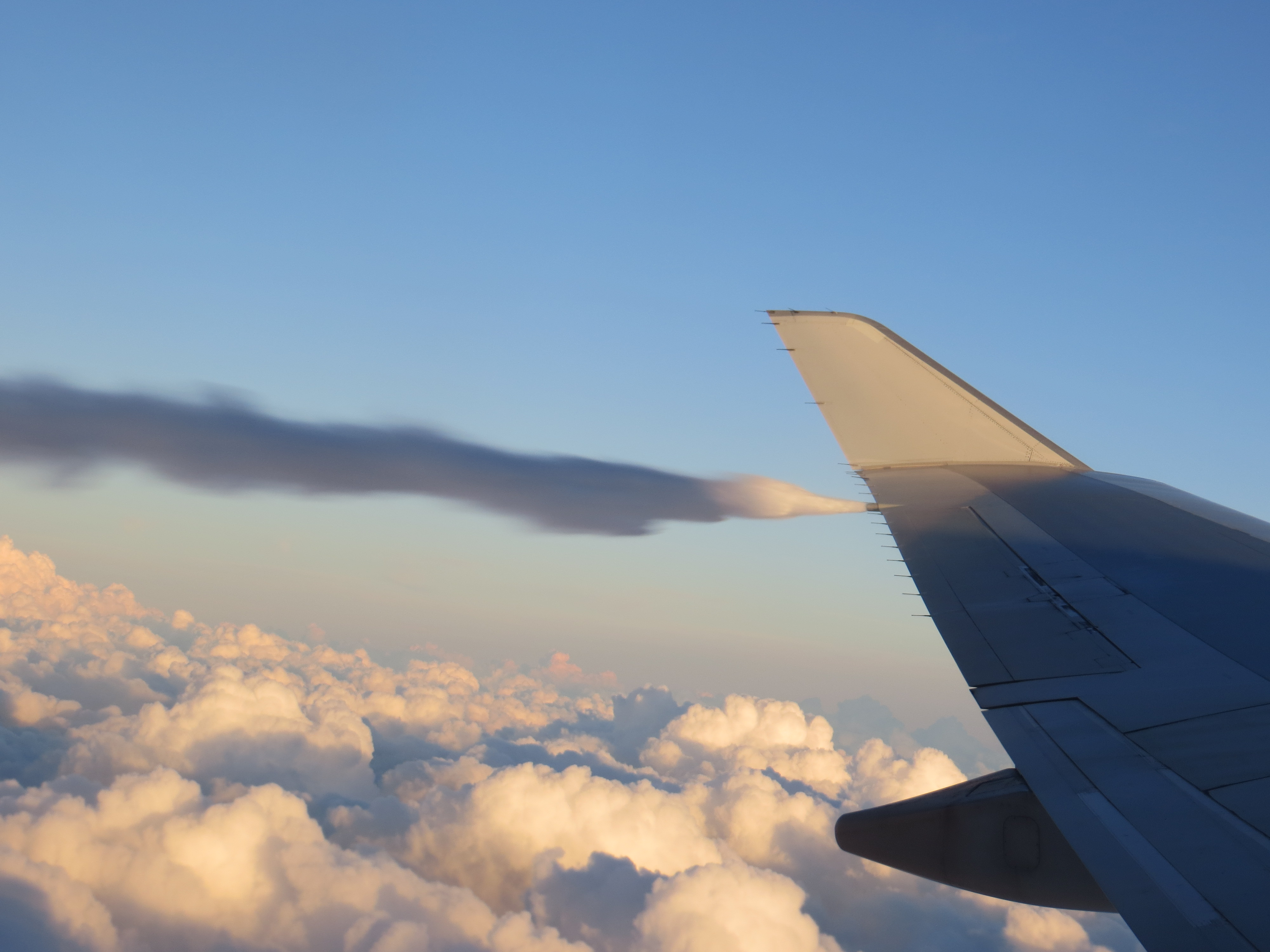
Fuel being dumped (jettisoned) from the left wing tank of Boeing 747-400

In aviation, to jettison is to discard fuel, external stores or other expendable items. The item is usually jettisoned by operating a switch or handle; external stores may be separated from the aircraft by use of explosive bolts or a mechanism.

== Fuel jettison ==
Fuel jettisoning or fuel dumping is an emergency procedure used by crews to reduce the weight of an aircraft in an emergency when the aircraft has reached its maximum landing weight.

== External stores jettison ==
Some military aircraft can carry weapons (for example bombs or rockets) and fuel tanks on external hardpoints. The pilot can jettison them if necessary, so they do not inhibit actions during combat or in an emergency. Airports may establish specific safe areas for the jettison of external stores, when required.

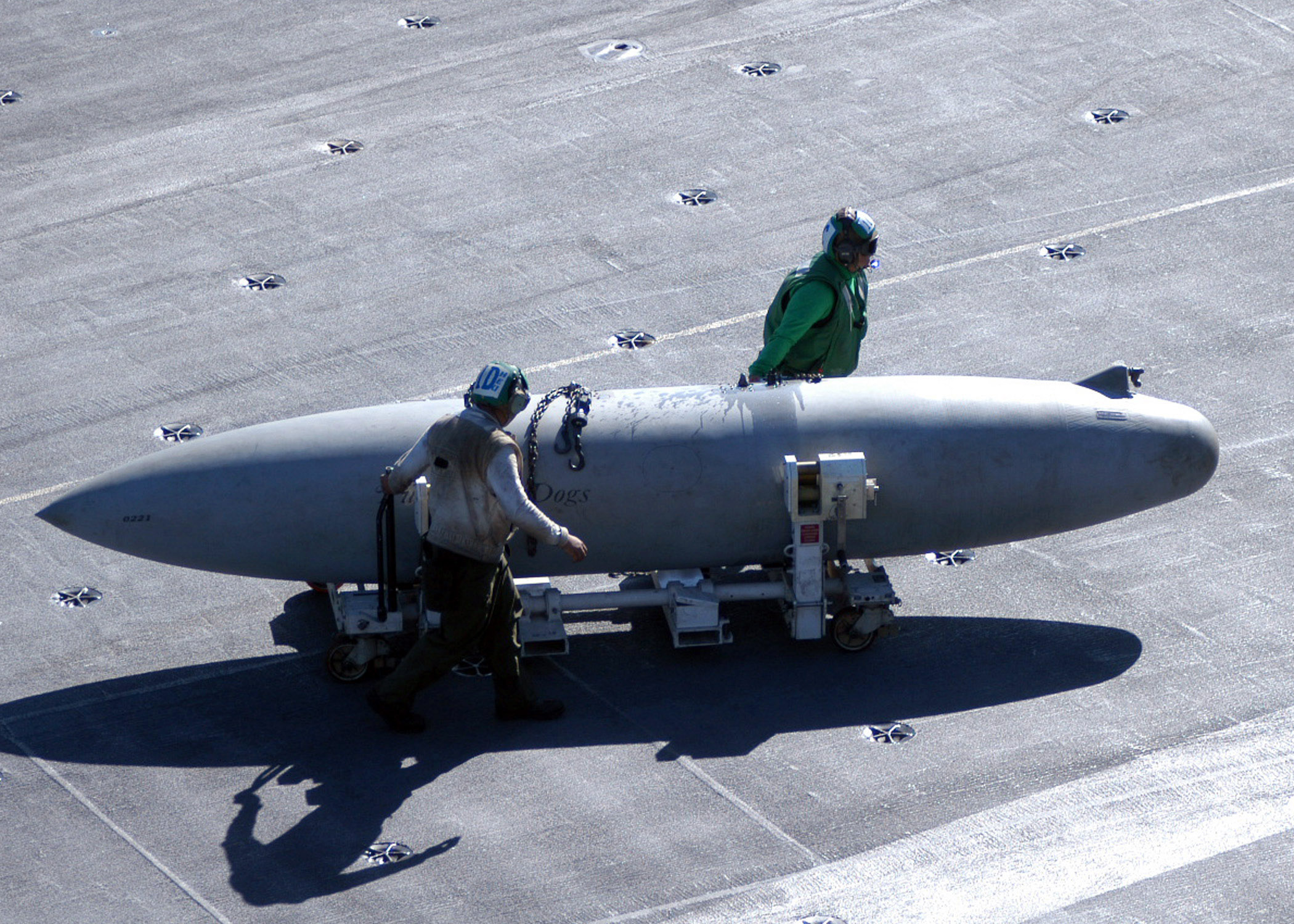
A 330-US-gallon-capacity (1,200 L) Sargent Fletcher drop tank being moved across the flight deck of an aircraft carrier

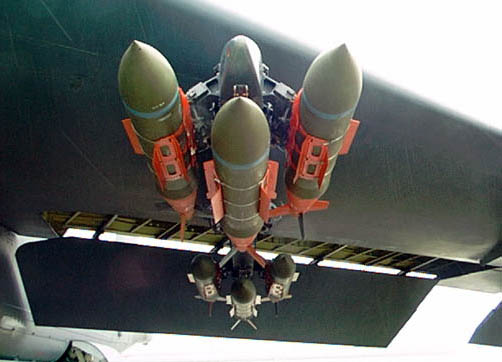
Three GBU-31 JDAM precision guided bombs on a triple-ejector rack, under the wing of a B-52

== Jettison for the purpose of gliding distance ==
In the checklist procedures for some general aviation aircraft, such as the Cessna 172, the pilot is to jettison heavy objects in the event of a ditching (water landing). This to reduce the total weight of the aircraft, which in turn increases the gliding distance. As opposed to the reduction in weight being benefitted in a shorter landing distance, the pilot is given more time to continue airborne.

In practice, this would consist of throwing items like luggage, chocks, personal items and cargo out of the cabin window or door.

== Other ==
Some aircraft may jettison components for various other reasons, for example slip-wing aircraft such as the Hillson F.H.40 that discards the upper wing after take off.

Hillson Bi-mono with slip-wing. The aircraft could take off as a biplane, jettison the upper, disposable wing, and continue flying as a monoplane. A single example was built, which successfully demonstrated jettisoning of the slip wing in flight

== See also ==
- Fuel dumping
