= Stemal III =

General information
- Type: Experimental aircraft
- National origin: Poland
- Designer: Stefan Malinowski
- Number built: 1

History
- First flight: Late August 1922

The Stemal III was a parasol wing test bed for a wing with variable camber, intended to increase the speed range of aircraft and to lower landing speeds. It was based on a Nieuport 80.

== Design and development ==
Stefan Malinowski's several aircraft designs were all named Stemal, the first syllables of his names joined together. The Stemal III was a test-bed for his ideas for extending the speed range of aircraft using variable camber wings, which he had begun to develop at the beginning of World War I whilst studying the Gustave Eiffel wind tunnel results on the lift generated by cambered aerofoil sections. His first experiments were with a modified Caudron wing but the external mechanism he used increased the drag unacceptably. Instead, he developed a wing with ribs which were flexible aft of the main, forward, spar together with an internal, rear spar, cam-based mechanism to bend them.

Malinkowski then took the device though aerodynamic tests in wind tunnels in Italy and made some initial practical tests with Ansaldo in Turin, all with encouraging results. The first full scale wing panel for structural and operational tests was built in 1921 at Bydgoszcz, in the workshops of the military flying school there. As a result Malinkowski obtained support from the Department of Aerial Navigation to build and fly a complete wing.

The test aircraft was originally built as a Nieuport 80 biplane, a two seat trainer variant of the Nieuport 12 fighter aircraft. With its wings and the rear cockpit removed and with a new empennage, it was converted to a parasol wing monoplane. The Malinowski wing was held over the fuselage on each side with two outward-leaning inverted V-struts from the upper fuselage to front and rear spars and wire-braced above from a strut pyramid above the wing centre and below with wires from the lower fuselage longerons. The camber changes were confined to the central part of the wing so that the ailerons were unaffected.

Piloted by Jerzy Kossowski, the Stemal III flew for the first time in late August 1922. The subsequent trials yielded promising results, with take-off and landing distances halved, rate of climb increased by 33% and service ceiling by 20%. Its stalling speed was reduced from 70 km/h (43 mph; 38 kn) without camber to 48 km/h (30 mph; 26 kn) with camber and its speed range, about 1:3.4, was much better than that of any of its contemporaries.

These tests generated some interest, particularly at the Technical Services of Aerodynamics (S.T.Aè) in Paris in 1924, leading to studies by Hanriot of a similar wing. In 1925 the Warsaw Technical University made air-tunnel measurements on a wing with a greater camber range over its full span, controlled with a simplified mechanism. Apart from the Stemal III, the only other aircraft to incorporate the variable-camber wing was Malinowski's Dziaba, a highly ambitious flying wing glider. This should have competed in the Second Polish Glider Contest, held in August 1923. It attended but was badly damaged in the run-up to its first launch and though it was repaired before the end of the competition a lack of wind kept it on the ground.

Funding problems limited any further wing development by Malinowski and although he sold his patents in November 1925, nothing more was made of them.

== Specifications ==
Data from Cynk (1971) Performance without camber changing unless noted

General characteristics

- Crew: One
- Length: 7.15 m (23 ft 5 in)
- Wingspan: 9 m (29 ft 6 in)
- Wing area: 12 m^{2} (130 sq ft)
- Empty weight: 620 kg (1,367 lb)
- Gross weight: 800 kg (1,764 lb)
- Powerplant: 1 × Le Rhône 9-cylinder rotary, 82 kW (110 hp)
- Propellers: 2-bladed

Performance

- Maximum speed: 165 km/h (103 mph, 89 kn)
- Stall speed: 70 km/h (43 mph, 38 kn) minimum speed; 48 kilometres per hour (30 mph; 26 kn) with camber changing
- Service ceiling: 3,000 m (9,800 ft) 3,600 m (11,800 ft) with camber changing
- Time to altitude: 16 min to 1,000 m (3,300 ft); 12 min with camber changing
- Take-off run: 60 m (200 ft); 30 m (98 ft) with camber changing
- Landing run: 70 m (230 ft); 35 m (115 ft) with camber changing

== See also ==
Aircraft of comparable role, configuration, and era

- Ellingston Special
- Makhonine Mak-10
- Nikitin-Shevchenko IS
- Schmeidler SN.2
