= Chine (aeronautics) =

Sharp angle in aircraft cross-sections used as control surface

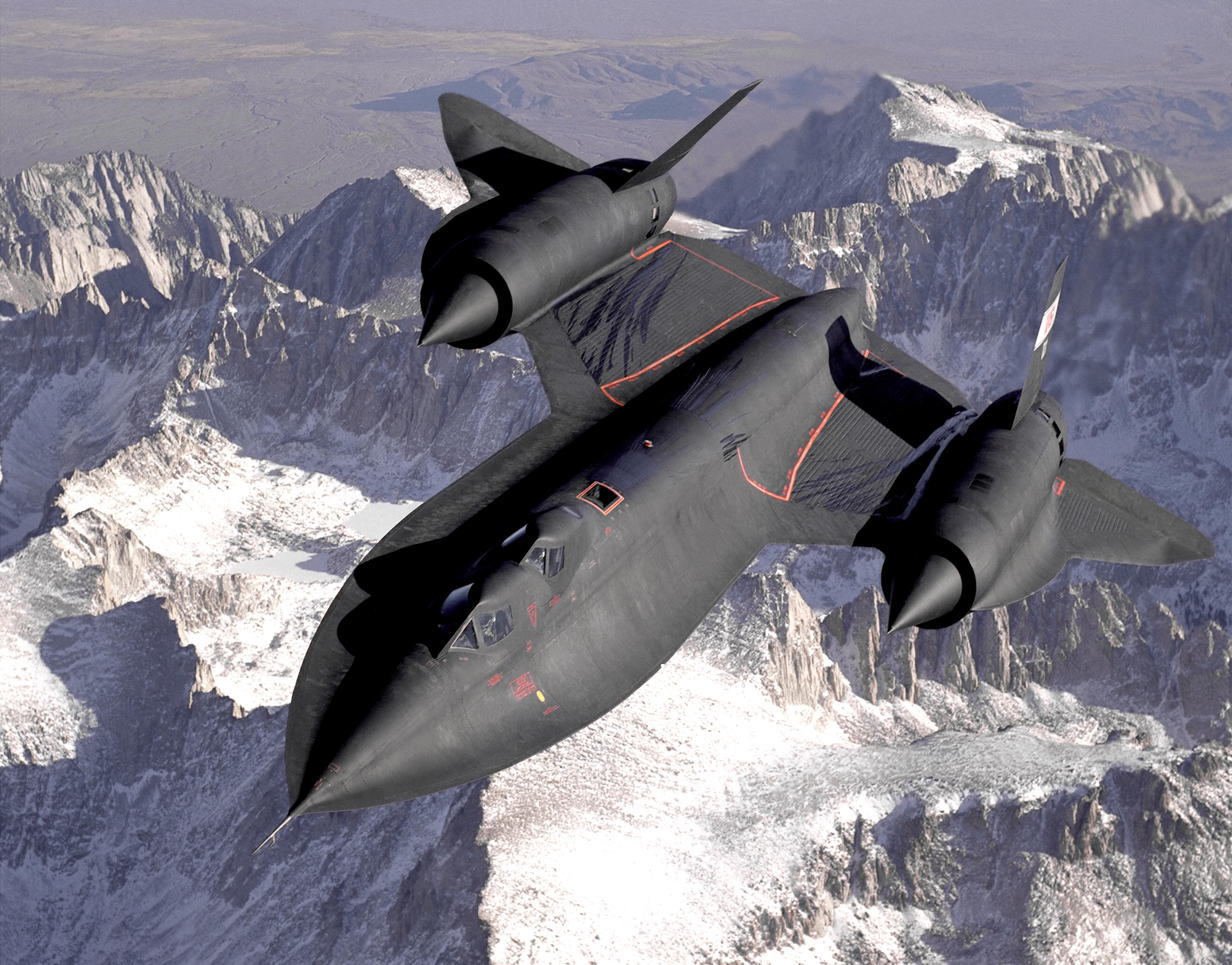
Chined fuselage of an SR-71 Blackbird

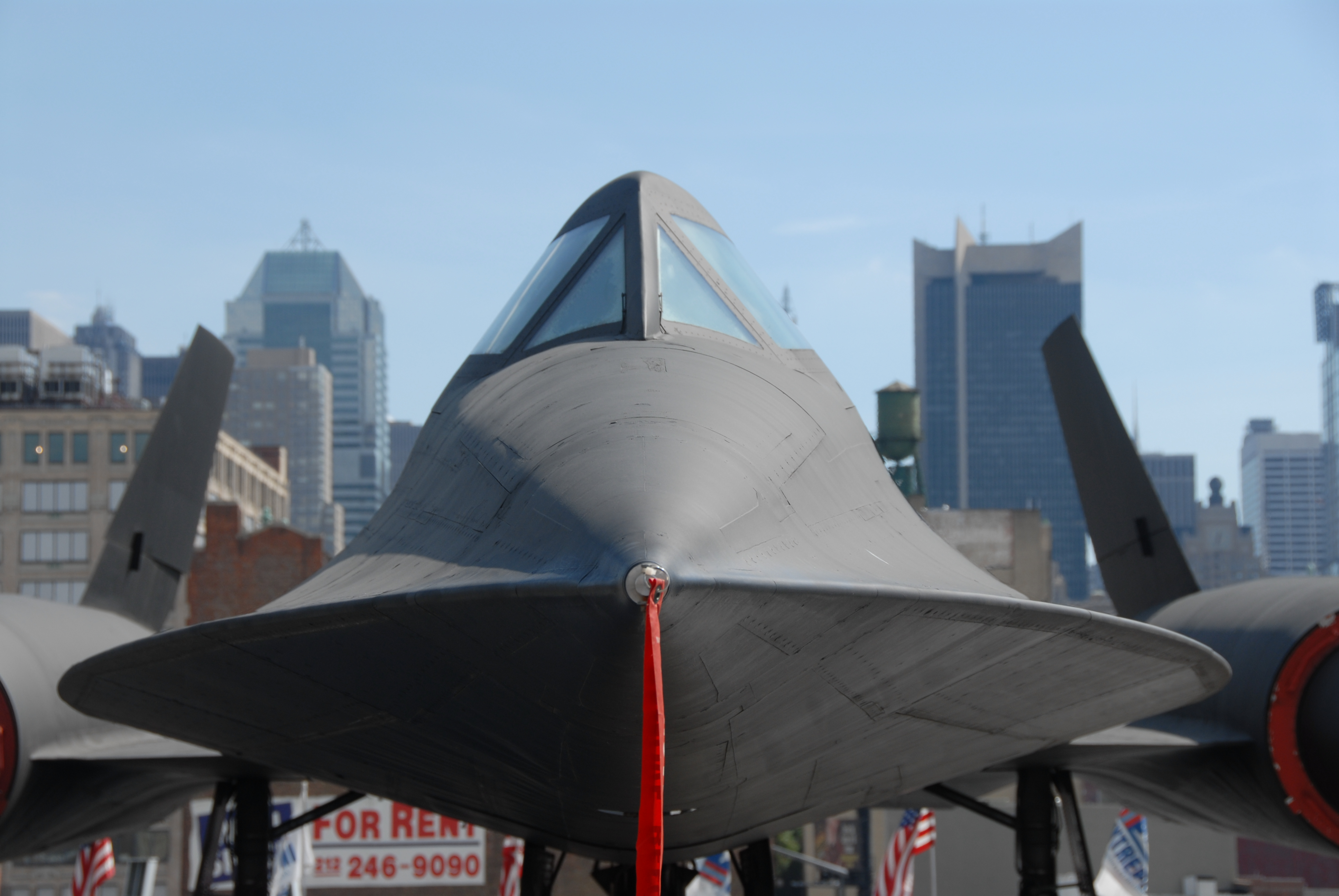
The front view of the A-12 showing forebody shaped into chines

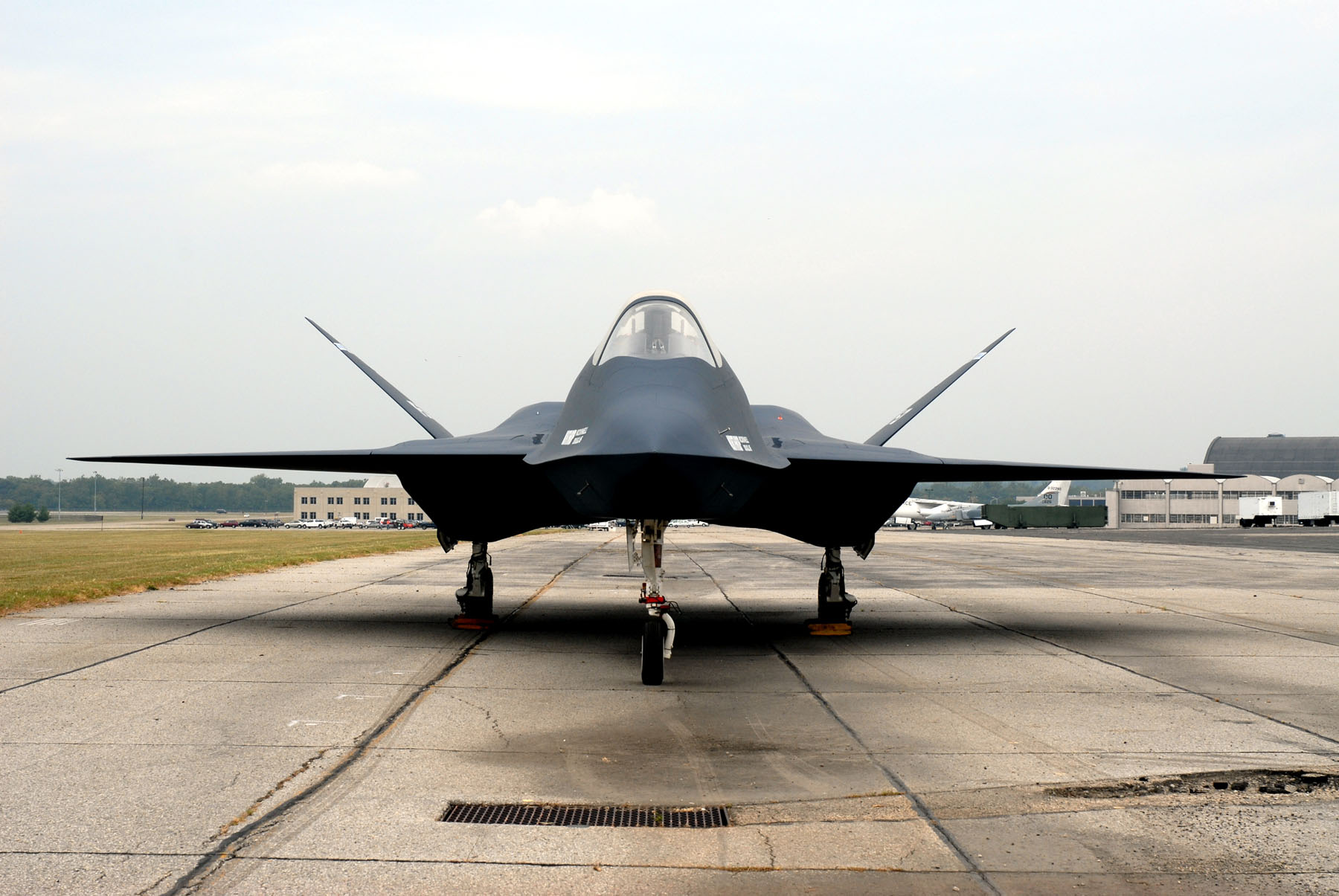
Chines visible on the Northrop YF-23

In aircraft design, a chine is a longitudinal line of sharp change in the cross-section profile of the fuselage or similar body. The term chine originates in boatbuilding, where it applies to a sharp profile change in the hull of a boat. (Note: Angled chine, different from soft (rounded) chine) In a flying boat hull or floatplane float, the longitudinal line of sharp change in cross-section where the bottom plane meets the sidewall is an example of a chine.

On some supersonic aircraft a chine extends sideways for some distance, with a very sharp edge blending in with the main wing leading edge root. (Note: NASA-AIAA-98-2725 Impact of fuselage cross-section on the stability of a generic fighter uses "chined-shaped fuselage cross section, chined forebody, fuselage with ... included chine angle" expressions. NASA CR 189641 and AIAA 2008-6228 use "Chine forebody and Chine fuselage") The rest of this article is concerned with this type of chine.

== Configuration ==
A chine can in aerodynamic terms act as a long extension of the wing root along the fuselage. Such chines first appeared on the Lockheed A-12 precursor of the SR-71 Blackbird, where they ran forward from the wing roots along the fuselage sides, into which they blended.

The Lockheed Martin F-22 Raptor has chines along its nose section that align with its engine air intakes. The small horizontal surfaces forming a fillet between the forward wing root and the air intake is more usually called a leading edge root extension (LERX) or leading-edge extension (LEX).

== Forward chines effects ==
Large chines along the forward fuselage can have a significant effect on aircraft lift, drag, longitudinal balance and directional stability.

=== Effect at high Mach numbers ===
The chines of the Lockheed Blackbird series extend about 40% of the aircraft's length and contribute useful additional lift at supersonic speeds. The chines may be understood as enhancing the lift generated by the forebody by acting as a low aspect ratio canard surface. In order to further increase this lift contribution, the forward fuselage is set with a positive incidence relative to the wing.

The chine lift increases with the square of the Mach number, helping counterbalance the rearward shift in the lift of the main wing in supersonic conditions. If a tailless (Delta) wing is trimmed for safe subsonic flight, at high speeds it gains excess trim drag in pitch and becomes excessively stable resulting in poor maneuverability. The destabilizing effect of a forward surface is provided by the chines where it is needed most, at high Mach numbers.

=== Effect at low airspeeds ===
Forward chines also act as leading edge root extensions (LERX) at low speeds and high angles of attack, generating a vortex flow over the inboard wing to stabilize the airflow and increase its speed locally, thus delaying the stall and also providing additional lift.

=== Directional effect ===
The chines also increase directional stability, by reducing the adverse effects of crosswinds or yaw on the forward fuselage. Unlike a conventional fuselage, the chines allow the crossflow to travel smoothly over their profile and beyond, avoiding the side forces due to flow separation and stagnation. Again the effect is stronger at higher speeds, and reduces the size of the vertical stabilizers (tail fins). The YF-12A lacked the foremost section of the chines seen on the SR-71 and consequently needed extra vertical tail surfaces.

=== Lateral effect ===
The improved crossflow behavior also benefits lateral characteristics by reducing yaw-induced roll, especially during landing and takeoff of delta-winged aircraft. This in turn helps reduce roll-yaw coupling and any tendency to Dutch roll. However chines have also been found to reduce lateral stability in some configurations, due to abrupt asymmetric vortex breakdown effect.

=== Stealth effect ===
Blending the chines into both the fuselage and the main wing avoids presenting corner reflectors or vertical sides to radars. This has led fifth-generation jet fighter designs to replace low-stealth canard surfaces with chines, when helping to generate vortex lift over the main wings. (An exception is the Chengdu J-20, whose canards are mounted inline with its chines.)

== See also ==
- Index of aviation articles
- Blended wing body
