= Vortilon =

Aerodynamic device

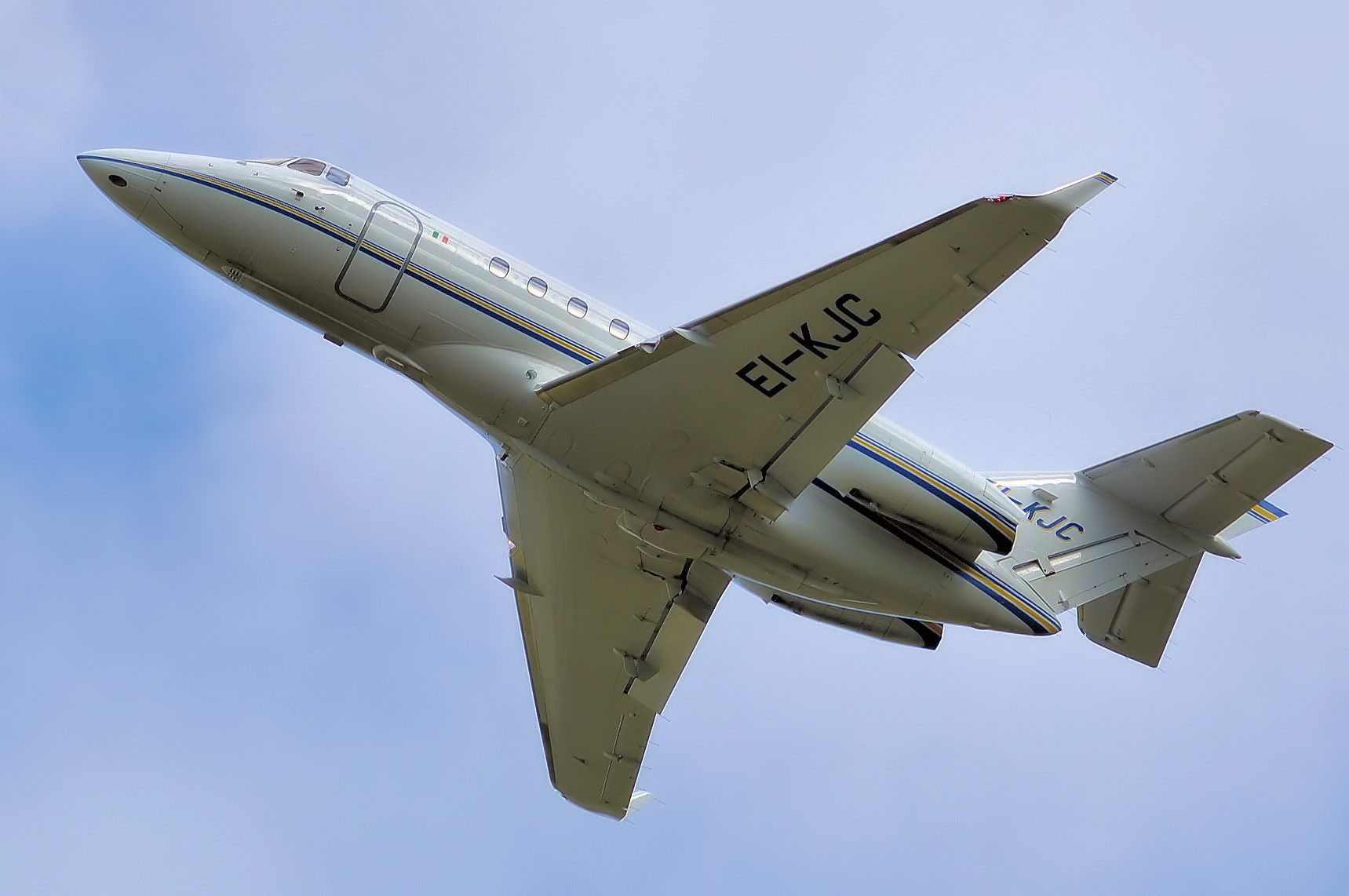
Vortilons can be seen projecting from underneath the center leading edge of the wings of this Hawker 850XP

Vortilons are fixed aerodynamic devices on aircraft wings used to improve handling at low speeds.

The vortilon was invented by aerodynamicists working at Douglas Aircraft who had previously developed the engine pylons for the Douglas DC-8. The original pylons which wrapped around the leading edge of the wing had to be cut back to reduce excessive cruise drag. Wind tunnel testing of the next Douglas commercial aircraft, the Douglas DC-9 which had no under-wing engines, showed a cutback engine pylon would be beneficial to wing lift and upwash at the tail at the low speed stall. The pylon was reduced in size and became the vortilon (VORTex-generating-pYLON).

Vortilons consist of one or more flat plates attached to the underside of the wing near its leading edge, aligned with the flight direction. When the speed is reduced and the aircraft approaches stall, the local flow at the leading edge is diverted outwards; this spanwise component of velocity around the vortilon creates a vortex streamed around the top surface, which energises the boundary layer. A more turbulent boundary layer, in turn, delays the local flow separation.

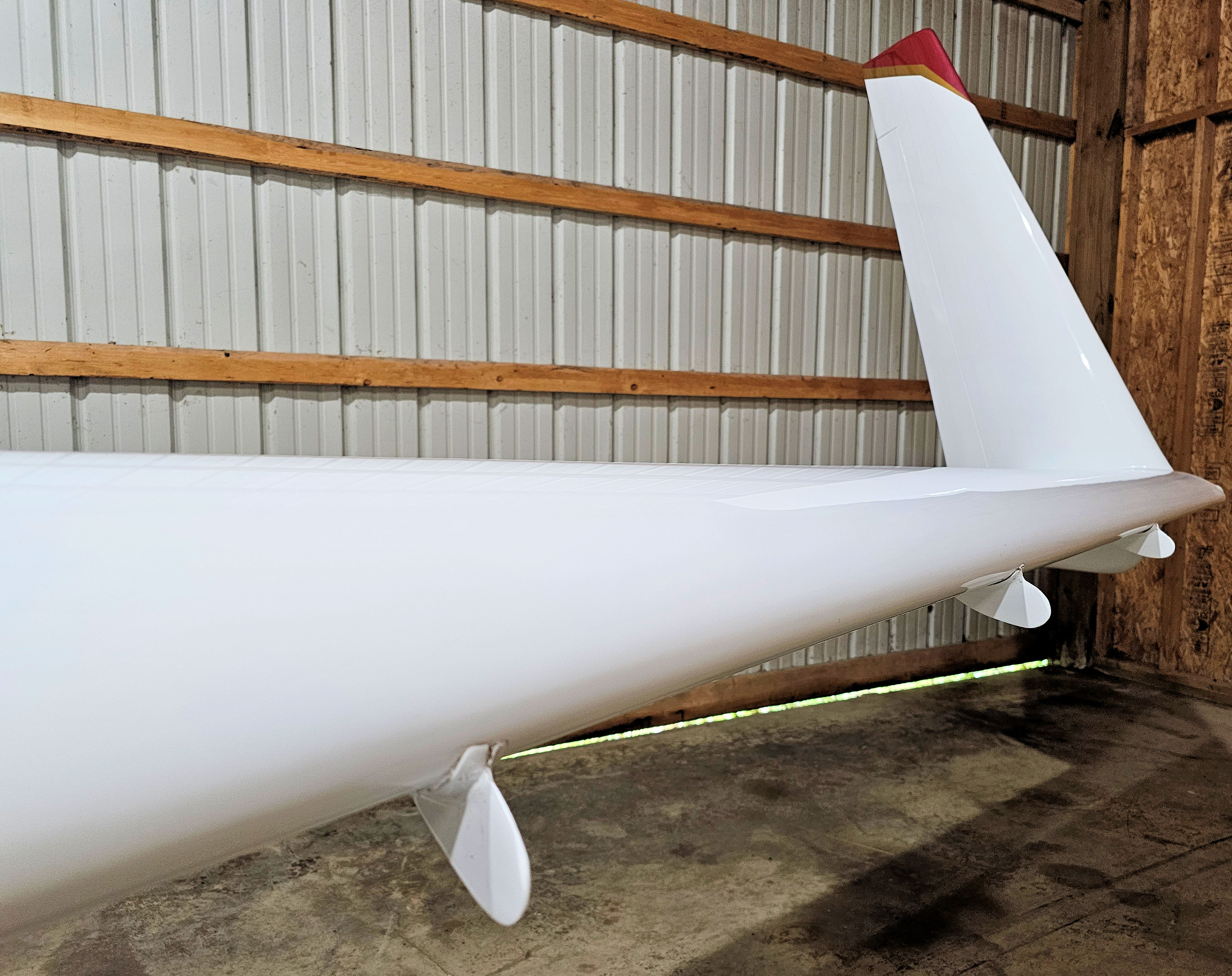
A view of three vortilons on the wing of a Cozy MKIV aircraft

Vortilons are often used to improve low-speed aileron performance, thereby increasing resistance to spin. They can be used as an alternative to wing fences, which also restrict airflow along the span of the wing. Vortilons only stream vortices at high angles of attack and produce less drag at higher speeds than wing fences. Pylons used to mount jet engines under the wing produce a similar effect.

The occurrence of span-wise flow at high angles of attack, such as observed on swept wings, is an essential requirement for vortilons to become effective. According to Burt Rutan, vortilons installed on straight wings would not have any effect.

Vortilons were first introduced with the McDonnell Douglas DC-9 to achieve a strong nose down pitching moment just beyond the normal stall and their influence ceased to have any effect beyond 30 degrees angle of attack. They have been used on subsequent aircraft, including:

- McDonnell Douglas MD-80
- McDonnell Douglas MD-90
- Boeing 717
- Rutan VariEze, replacing leading edge cuffs (1984)
- Rutan Long-EZ
- Cozy MK IV
- BAe 125 1000 series
- Hawker 800XP
- Embraer ERJ 145 family
- Learjet 45
- Aériane Swift
- Experimental Vought F-8 Crusader with supercritical wing. The supercritical wing would have been prone to pitch-up as the wing had increased sweep and aspect ratio compared to the standard wing. No pitch-up problems were experienced with vortilons fitted.
- Bombardier Challenger 300, later becoming the Challenger 350 & new 3500 series.

== See also ==
- Vortex generator
- Wing fence
