= Leading-edge cuff =

Fixed aerodynamic wing device

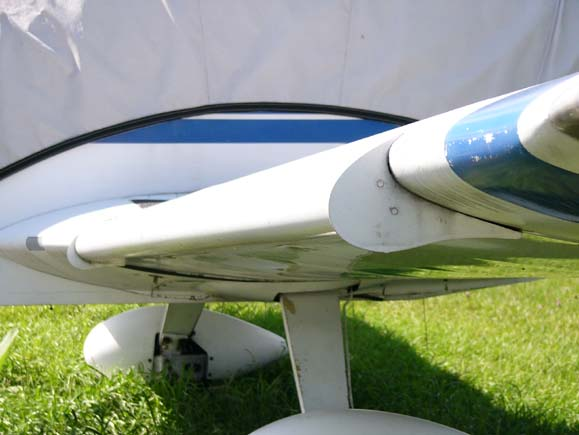
A drooped leading-edge cuff installed on an American Aviation AA-1 Yankee as part of a NASA experiment

A leading-edge cuff is a fixed aerodynamic wing device employed on fixed-wing aircraft to improve the stall and spin characteristics. Cuffs may be either factory-designed or an after-market add-on modification.

A leading-edge cuff is a wing leading-edge modification, usually a lightly drooped outboard leading-edge extension. In most cases of outboard leading-edge modification, the wing cuff starts about 50–70% half-span and spans the outer leading edge of the wing.

The main goal is to produce a more gradual and gentler stall onset, without any spin departure tendency, particularly where the original wing has a sharp/asymmetric stall behaviour with a passive, non-moving, low-cost device that would have a minimal impact on performance. A further benefit is to lowering stall speed, with lower approach speeds and shorter landing distances. They may also, depending on cuff location, improve aileron control at low speed.

== Terminology ==
Leading-edge cuffs were called droop concept or drooped leading edge (DLE), or modified outboard leading edge in technical reports on stall/spin resistance. In these reports and others NASA reports on the same object, "leading-edge cuff" expression was not used.

Other authors use simply "cuff" or "wing cuff".

== History ==
NASA led a general aviation stall/spin research program during the 1970s and 1980s, using model and full-scale experiments, seeking an effective means to improve stall/spin characteristics of general aviation airplanes.

The effect of a central notch at mid-span on the wing maximum lift was demonstrated in 1976. Following the testing of different leading-edge modifications on models and full-sized aircraft NASA eventually selected the semi-span drooped leading edge (DLE) that was tested first on an American Aviation AA-1 Yankee (1978).

A 1979 NASA report explains that at high angles of attack the cuff discontinuity generates a vortex that acts as a fence, preventing the separated flow from progressing outboard. The lift slope has a flatter top and the stall angle is delayed to a higher angle. To reach high angles of attack, the outboard airfoil has to be drooped, some experiments investigating "exaggerated" drooped leading edges. The physical reason for the cuff effect was not clearly explained.

Some much older reports gave some similar results. A 1932 NACA report about the effect of leading-edge slots of various lengths said, "this is an indication that the slotted portion on each tip of the wing operates to some extent as a separate wing".

Getting higher lift coefficients as a result of boundary layer removal is well known on propellers (centrifugal force causing an outward displacement of the boundary layer), or wings (boundary-layer suction). The leading-edge cuff inboard vortex and wing tip vortex act both to remove the boundary layer of the wing's outer section, helping this low-aspect-ratio virtual wing to achieve a higher stall angle.

An important point is that the wing seems to be aerodynamically split in two parts, the inner stalled part and the outer part that behaves as an isolated low-aspect-ratio wing, able to reach a high angle of attack. The sharp discontinuity of the cuff is a key factor; all attempts by gradual fairing to suppress the vortex and the positive effects of the modification reintroduced an abrupt tip stall.

== Stall/spin results ==
According to a NASA stall/spin report, "The basic airplanes: AA-1 (Yankee), C-23 (Sundowner), PA-28 (Arrow), C-172 (Skyhawk) entered spins in 59 to 98 percent of the intentional spin-entry attempts, whereas the modified aircraft entered spins in only 5 percent of the attempts and required prolonged, aggravated control inputs or out-of-limit loadings to promote spin entry."

== Wing aspect ratio and location effects ==
The most successful NASA experimental results were obtained on a quite low 6:1 aspect ratio wing (Grumman Yankee AA-1), with a DLE placed at 57% of the semi-span. As the vortices (inboard cuff and wing tip) are efficient on a limited span length (about 1.5 times the local chord), a DLE alone is unable to preserve enough outboard lift to keep the roll control in case of high aspect ratio wing. Wings of more than 8 or 9 aspect ratio features other devices to complete the cuff effect, for example stall strips (as used on the Cirrus SR22 and Cessna 400), "Rao slots" (as used on the Questair Venture), vortex generators or segmented droop (as used on a NASA modified Cessna 210). In the case of the high aspect ratio Cessna 210 wing (AR =11:1), roll damping at stall was not as efficient.

The case of high-wing configuration wing was different. Full scale testing of a modified Cessna 172 showed that the outboard leading-edge cuff alone was not sufficient to prevent a spin departure, the aircraft lacking directional stability at high angles of attack. With a ventral fin added, the aircraft entered a controlled spiral in lieu of a spin.

== Drag penalty ==
Depending on the cuff length and shape, the leading-edge cuff can exert an aerodynamic penalty for the stall/spin resistance speed obtained, resulting in some loss of cruise airspeed, although sometimes too small "to be detected with production instruments". In the case of the best wing modification of the AA-1 Yankee, the loss of cruise speed amounted to 2 mph or 2% and there was no speed loss in climb. Impact on cruise speed of the Piper PA-28 RX (modified T-tail) was not measurable. For the Questair Venture, "In carefully controlled performance tests, the penalty in cruise performance was found to be imperceptible (1 kt)".

== Applications ==
The first use of outboard cuffs, other than on NASA research airplanes, was on the Rutan VariEze in 1978. They were wind tunnel tested in 1982, and later (1984) replaced by vortilons.

Following aircraft were modified for experiments with the addition of an outboard leading-edge cuff as a result of NASA stall/spin research program :

- Grumman American AA-1X (1978)
- Beechcraft C-23X (1980)
- Piper PA28 RX modified (T-tail) (1981)
- Cessna 172X (1983),
- Verilite Sunbird, high-wing pusher (1986)
- Questair Venture
- Cessna 210 (1987), high wing aspect ratio,
- Smith Trainer (1992)
- Lancair Legacy (2013)

Leading-edge cuffs are used on 1900s high-performance light aircraft like the Cirrus SR20 and Columbia 350, which both gained FAA-certification with the device.

Several after-market suppliers of STOL kits make use of leading-edge cuffs, in some cases in conjunction with such other aerodynamic devices as wing fences and drooping ailerons.

== See also ==
- Leading-edge droop flap
- Leading-edge slat
- Strake (aeronautics)
