= Leading-edge extension =

Anti-stall control surface on aircraft

Aircraft wing leading-edge extensions – annotated

A leading-edge extension (LEX) is a small extension to an aircraft wing surface, forward of the leading edge. The primary reason for adding an extension is to improve the airflow at high angles of attack and low airspeeds, to improve handling and delay the stall. A dog tooth can also improve airflow and reduce drag at higher speeds.

== Leading-edge slat ==
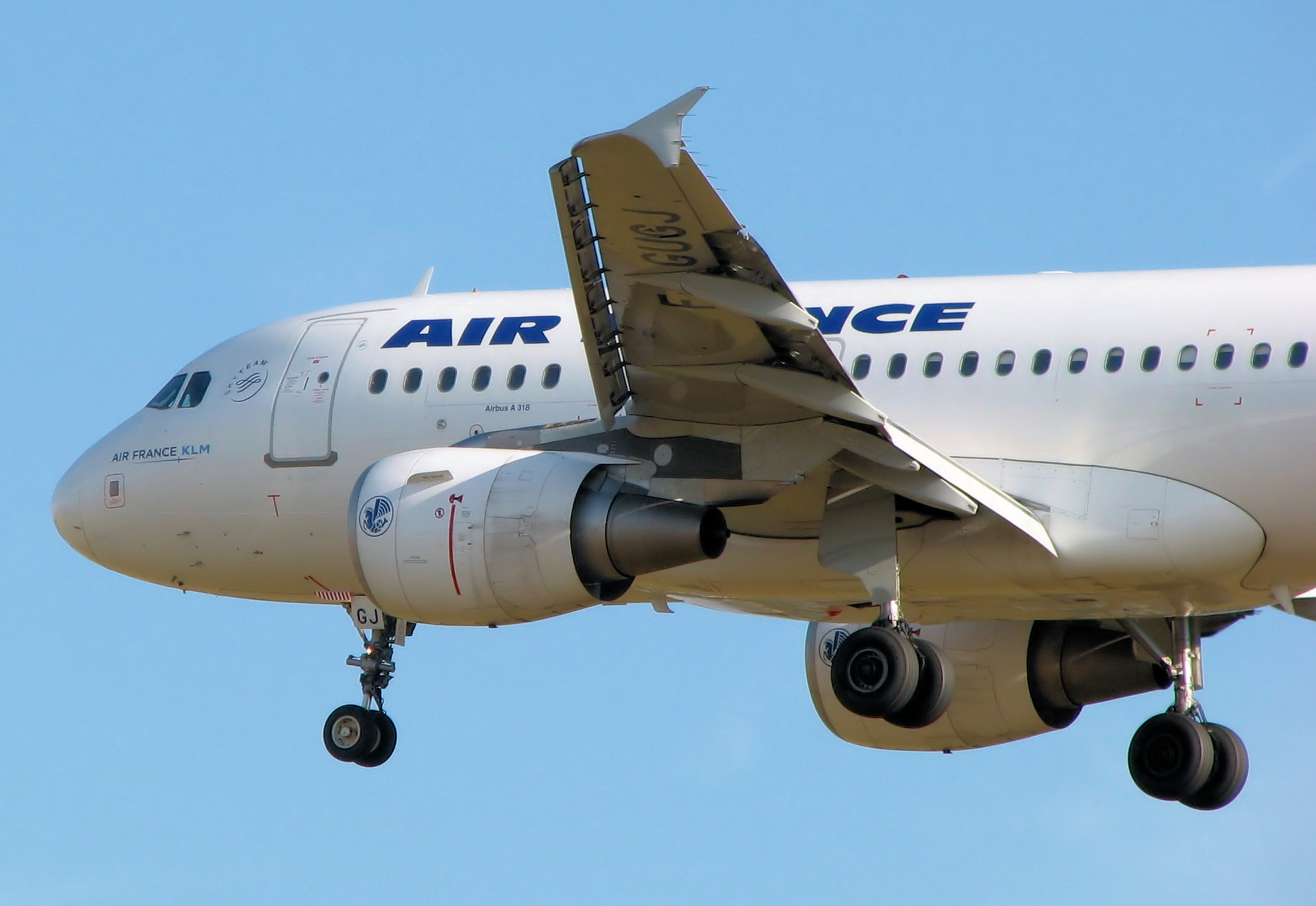
Leading-edge slats deployed on an Airbus A318-100

A leading-edge slat is an aerodynamic surface running spanwise just ahead of the wing leading edge. It creates a leading edge slot between the slat and wing which directs air over the wing surface, helping to maintain smooth airflow at low speeds and high angles of attack. This delays the stall, allowing the aircraft to fly at a higher angle of attack. Slats may be made fixed, or retractable in normal flight to minimize drag.

== Dogtooth extension ==
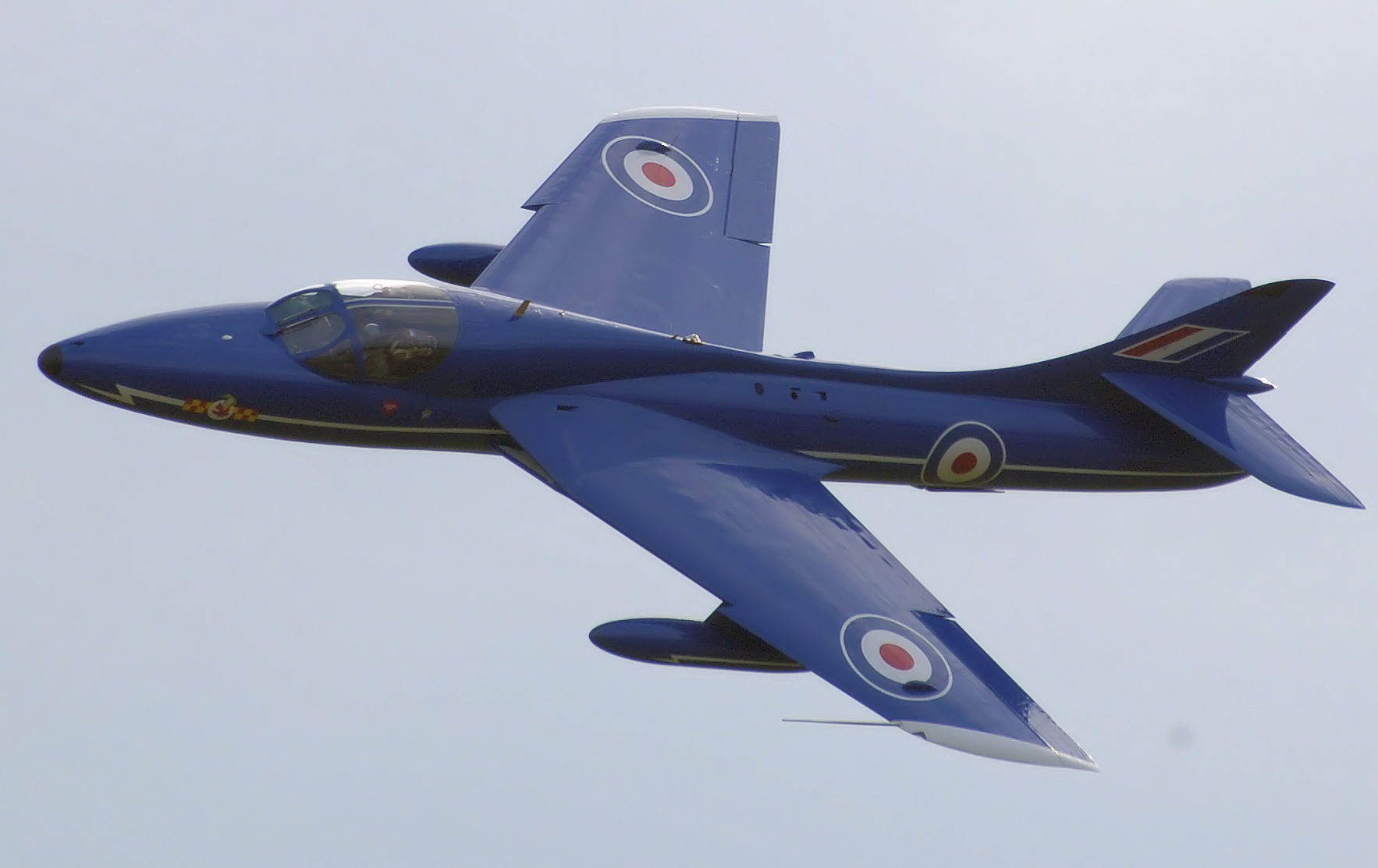
Dog tooth on the wing of a Hawker Hunter

A dogtooth is a small, sharp zig-zag break in the leading edge of a wing. It is usually used on a swept wing, to generate a vortex flow field to prevent separated flow from progressing outboard at high angle of attack. The effect is the same as a wing fence. It can also be used on straight wings in a drooped leading edge arrangement.

Many high-performance aircraft use the dogtooth design, which induces a vortex over the wing to control boundary layer spanwise extension, increasing lift and improving resistance to stall. Some of the best-known uses of the dogtooth are in the stabilizer of the F-15 Eagle and the wings of the F-4 Phantom II, F/A-18 Super Hornet, CF-105 Arrow, F-8 Crusader, and the Ilyushin Il-62. Where the dogtooth is added as an afterthought, as for example on the Hawker Hunter and some variants of the Quest Kodiak, the dogtooth is created by adding an extension to the outer section of the leading edge.

== Leading-edge cuff ==
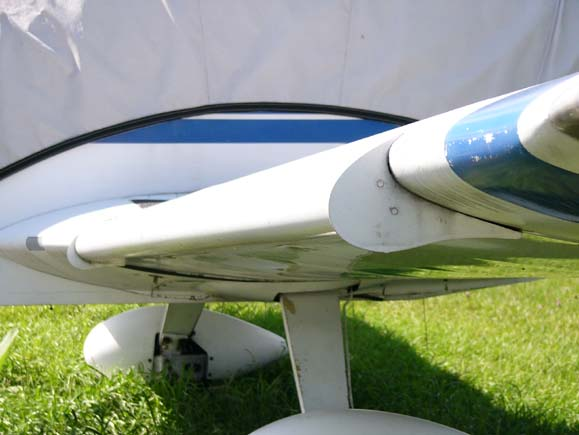
Experimental drooped leading-edge cuff on an American Aviation AA-1 Yankee

A leading edge cuff (or wing cuff) is a fixed aerodynamic device employed on fixed-wing aircraft to introduce a sharp discontinuity in the leading edge of the wing in the same way as a dogtooth. It also typically has a slightly drooped leading edge to improve low-speed characteristics.

== Leading-edge root extension ==
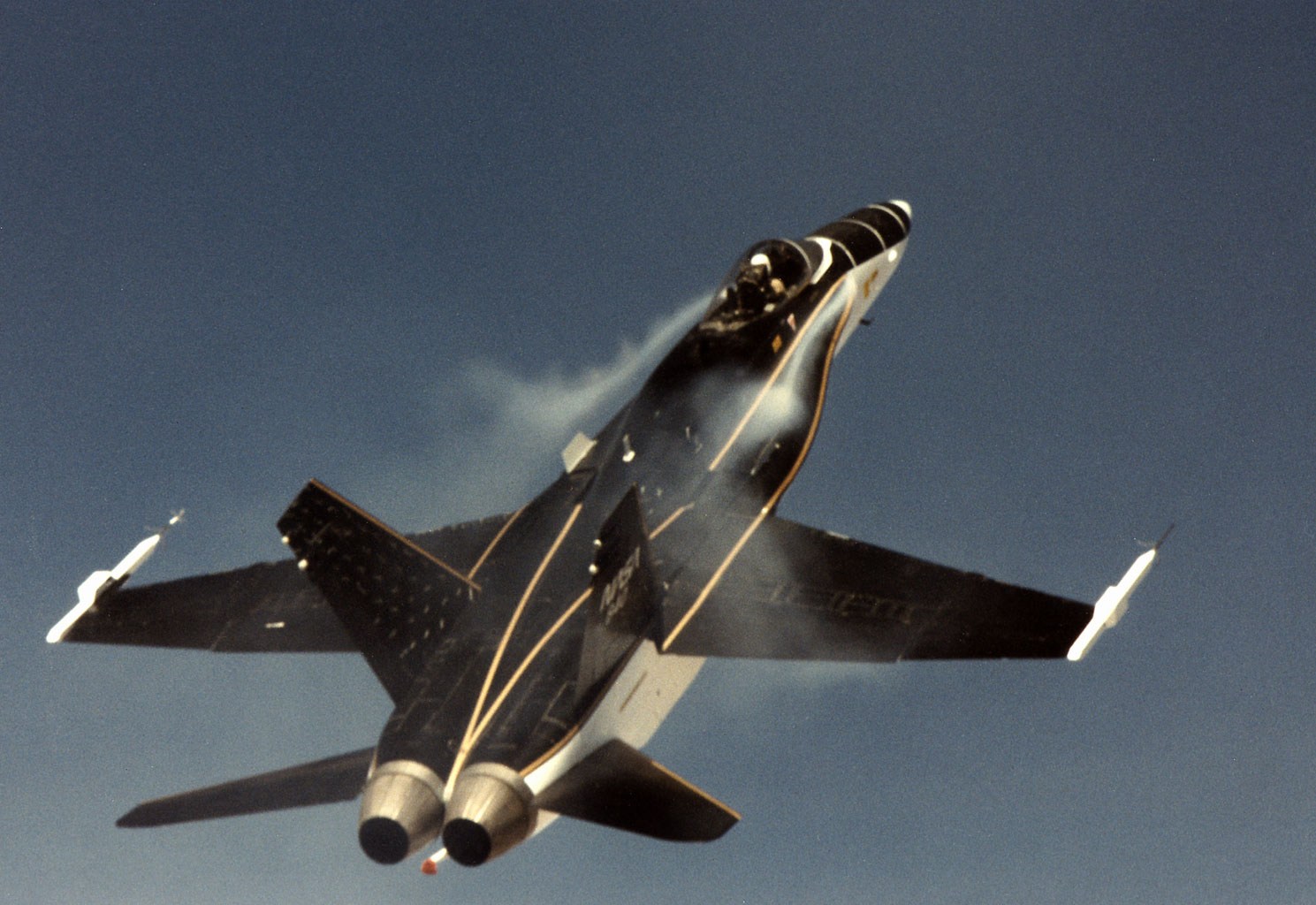
Condensation vortex flows along the LERX of an F/A-18

A leading-edge root extension (LERX) is a small fillet, typically roughly triangular in shape, running forward from the leading edge of the wing root to a point along the fuselage. These are often called simply leading-edge extensions (LEX), although they are not the only kind. To avoid ambiguity, this article uses the term LERX.

On a modern fighter aircraft, LERXes induce controlled airflow over the wing at high angles of attack, so delaying the stall and consequent loss of lift. In cruising flight, the effect of the LERX is minimal. However, at high angles of attack, as often encountered in a dogfight or during takeoff and landing, the LERX generates a high-speed vortex that attaches to the top of the wing. The vortex action maintains the attachment of the airflow to the upper-wing surface well past the normal stall point at which the airflow separates from the wing surface, thus sustaining lift at very high angles.

LERX were first used on the Northrop F-5 "Freedom Fighter" which flew in 1959, and have since become commonplace on many combat aircraft. The F/A-18 Hornet has especially large examples, as does the Sukhoi Su-27 and the CAC/PAC JF-17 Thunder. The Su-27 LERX helps make some advanced maneuvers possible, such as the Pugachev's Cobra, the Cobra Turn and the Kulbit.

A long, narrow sideways extension to the fuselage, attached in this position, is an example of a chine.

== Leading-edge vortex controller ==
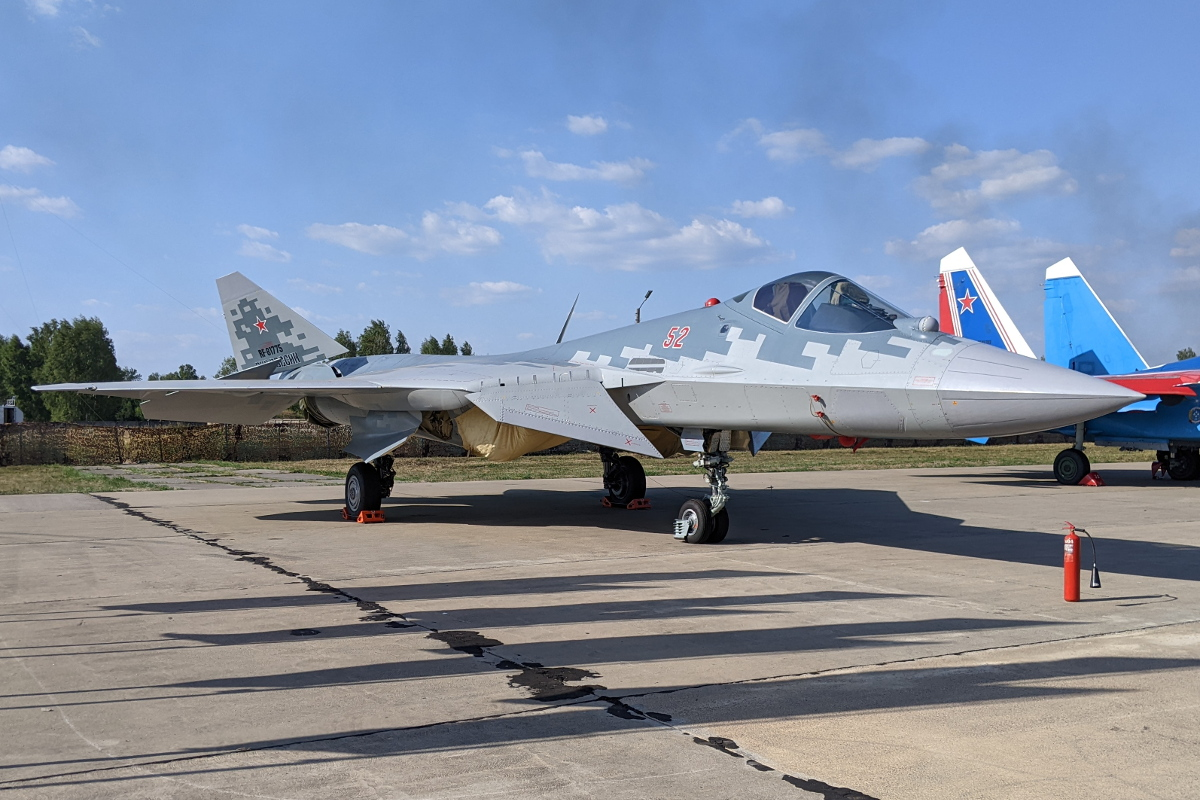
Su-57 with its LEVCONs deployed.

Leading-edge vortex controller (LEVCON) systems are a continuation of leading-edge root extension (LERX) technology, but with actuation that allows the leading edge vortices to be modified without adjusting the aircraft's attitude. Otherwise they operate on the same principles as the LERX system to create lift augmenting leading edge vortices during high angle of attack flight.

This system has been incorporated in the Russian Sukhoi Su-57 and Indian HAL LCA Navy.

The LEVCONs actuation ability also improves its performance over the LERX system in other areas. When combined with the thrust vectoring controller (TVC), the aircraft controllability at extreme angles of attack is further increased, which assists in stunts which require supermaneuverability such as Pugachev's Cobra. Additionally, on the Sukhoi Su-57 the LEVCON system is used for increased departure-resistance in the event of TVC failure at a post-stall attitude. It can also be used for trimming the aircraft, and optimizing the lift to drag ratio during cruise.

== See also ==
- Index of aviation articles
- Canard (aeronautics)
- Krueger flap
- Strake (aviation)
- Vortex generator
