= Vortex generator =

Aerodynamic device

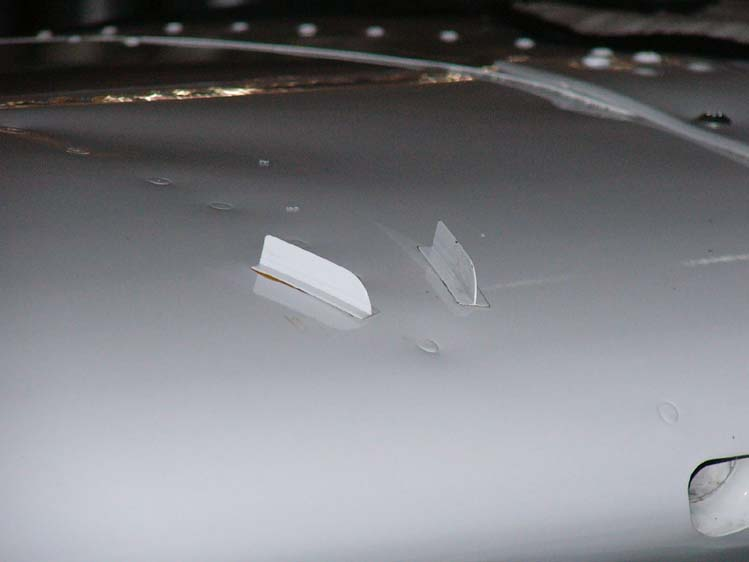
Aftermarket Micro Aerodynamics vortex generators mounted on the wing of a Cessna 182K

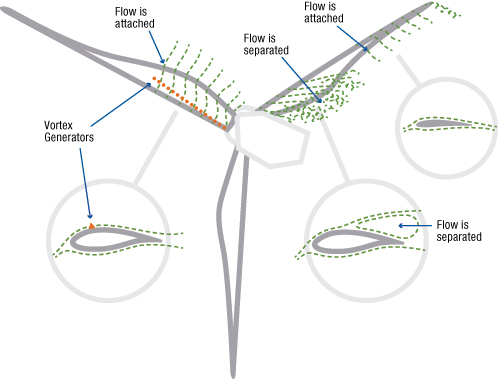
Sketch describing how vortex generators improve flow characteristics on a wind turbine

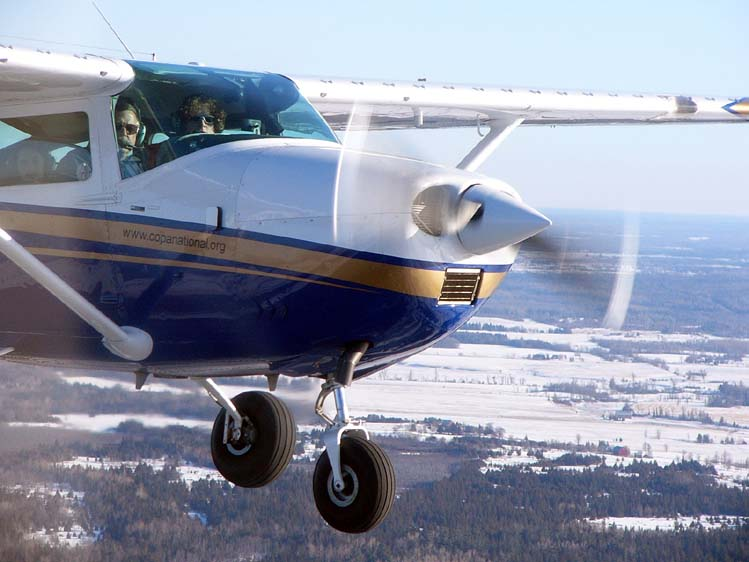
1967 Model Cessna 182K in flight showing after-market vortex generators on the wing leading edge

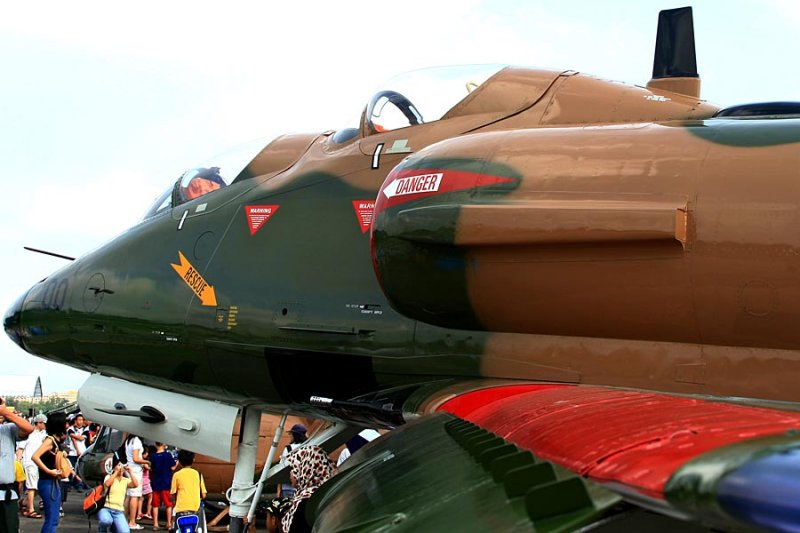
TA-4SU Super Skyhawk showing the row of vortex generators on the drooped leading edge slats.

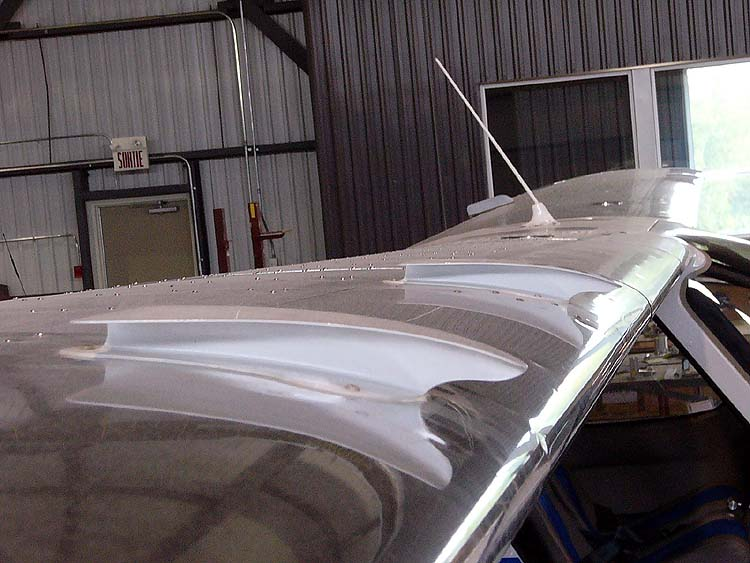
The Symphony SA-160 was designed with two unusual vortex generators on its wing to ensure aileron effectiveness through the stall

A vortex generator (VG) is an aerodynamic device, consisting of a small vane usually attached to a lifting surface (or airfoil, such as an aircraft wing) or a rotor blade of a wind turbine. VGs may also be attached to some part of an aerodynamic vehicle such as an aircraft fuselage or a car. When the airfoil or the body is in motion relative to the air, the VG creates a vortex, which, by removing some part of the slow-moving boundary layer in contact with the airfoil surface, delays local flow separation and aerodynamic stalling, thereby improving the effectiveness of wings and control surfaces, such as flaps, elevators, ailerons, and rudders.

== Method of operation ==
Vortex generators are most often used to delay flow separation. To accomplish this they are often placed on the external surfaces of vehicles and wind turbine blades. On both aircraft and wind turbine blades they are usually installed quite close to the leading edge of the aerofoil in order to maintain steady airflow over the control surfaces at the trailing edge. VGs are typically rectangular or triangular, about as tall as the local boundary layer, and run in spanwise lines usually near the thickest part of the wing. They can be seen on the wings and vertical tails of many airliners.

Vortex generators are positioned obliquely so that they have an angle of attack with respect to the local airflow in order to create a tip vortex which draws energetic, rapidly moving outside air into the slow-moving boundary layer in contact with the surface. A turbulent boundary layer is less likely to separate than a laminar one, and is therefore desirable to ensure effectiveness of trailing-edge control surfaces. Vortex generators are used to trigger this transition. Other devices such as vortilons, leading-edge extensions, and leading-edge cuffs, also delay flow separation at high angles of attack by re-energizing the boundary layer.

Examples of aircraft which use VGs include the ST Aerospace A-4SU Super Skyhawk and Symphony SA-160. For swept-wing transonic designs, VGs alleviate potential shock-stall problems (e.g., Harrier, Blackburn Buccaneer, Gloster Javelin).

== Aftermarket installation ==
Many aircraft carry vane vortex generators from time of manufacture, but there are also aftermarket suppliers who sell VG kits to improve the STOL performance of some light aircraft. Aftermarket suppliers claim (i) that VGs lower stall speed and reduce take-off and landing speeds, and (ii) that VGs increase the effectiveness of ailerons, elevators and rudders, thereby improving controllability and safety at low speeds. For home-built and experimental kitplanes, VGs are cheap, cost-effective and can be installed quickly; but for certified aircraft installations, certification costs can be high, making the modification a relatively expensive process.

Owners fit aftermarket VGs primarily to gain benefits at low speeds, but a downside is that such VGs may reduce cruise speed slightly. In tests performed on a Cessna 182 and a Piper PA-28-235 Cherokee, independent reviewers have documented a loss of cruise speed of 1.5 to 2.0 kn (2.8 to 3.7 km/h). However, these losses are relatively minor, since an aircraft wing at high speed has a small angle of attack, thereby reducing VG drag to a minimum.

Owners have reported that on the ground, it can be harder to clear snow and ice from wing surfaces with VGs than from a smooth wing, but VGs are not generally prone to inflight icing as they reside within the boundary layer of airflow. VGs may also have sharp edges which can tear the fabric of airframe covers and may thus require special covers to be made.

For twin-engined aircraft, manufacturers claim that VGs reduce single-engine control speed (Vmca), increase zero fuel and gross weight, improve the effectiveness of ailerons and rudder, provide a smoother ride in turbulence and make the aircraft a more stable instrument platform.

== Increase in maximum takeoff weight ==
Some VG kits available for light twin-engine airplanes may allow an increase in maximum takeoff weight. The maximum takeoff weight of a twin-engine airplane is determined by structural requirements and single-engine climb performance requirements (which are lower for a lower stall speed). For many light twin-engine airplanes, the single-engine climb performance requirements determine a lower maximum weight rather than the structural requirements. Consequently, anything that can be done to improve the single-engine-inoperative climb performance will bring about an increase in maximum takeoff weight.

In the US from 1945 until 1991, the one-engine-inoperative climb requirement for multi-engine airplanes with a maximum takeoff weight of 6,000 lb (2,700 kg) or less was as follows:

All multi-engine airplanes having a stalling speed $V_{s0}$ greater than 70 miles per hour shall have a steady rate of climb of at least $0.02(V_{s0})^2$ in feet per minute at an altitude of 5,000 feet with the critical engine inoperative and the remaining engines operating at not more than maximum continuous power, the inoperative propeller in the minimum drag position, landing gear retracted, wing flaps in the most favorable position …

where $V_{s0}$ is the stalling speed in the landing configuration in miles per hour.

Installation of vortex generators can usually bring about a slight reduction in stalling speed of an airplane and therefore reduce the required one-engine-inoperative climb performance. The reduced requirement for climb performance allows an increase in maximum takeoff weight, at least up to the maximum weight allowed by structural requirements. An increase in maximum weight allowed by structural requirements can usually be achieved by specifying a maximum zero fuel weight or, if a maximum zero fuel weight is already specified as one of the airplane's limitations, by specifying a new higher maximum zero fuel weight. For these reasons, vortex generator kits for many light twin-engine airplanes are accompanied by a reduction in maximum zero fuel weight and an increase in maximum takeoff weight.

The one-engine-inoperative rate-of-climb requirement does not apply to single-engine airplanes, so gains in the maximum takeoff weight (based on stall speed or structural considerations) are less significant compared to those for 1945–1991 twins.

After 1991, the airworthiness certification requirements in the USA specify the one-engine-inoperative climb requirement as a gradient independent of stalling speed, so there is less opportunity for vortex generators to increase the maximum takeoff weight of multi-engine airplanes whose certification basis is FAR 23 at amendment 23-42 or later.

== Maximum landing weight ==
Because the landing weights of most light aircraft are determined by structural considerations and not by stall speed, most VG kits increase only the takeoff weight and not the landing weight. Any increase in landing weight would require either structural modifications or re-testing the aircraft at the higher landing weight to demonstrate that the certification requirements are still met. However, after a lengthy flight, sufficient fuel may have been used, thereby bringing the aircraft back below the permitted maximum landing weight.

== Aircraft noise reduction ==
Vortex generators have been used on the wing underside of Airbus A320 family aircraft to reduce noise generated by airflow over circular pressure equalisation vents for the fuel tanks. Lufthansa claims a noise reduction of up to 2 dB can thus be achieved.

== See also ==
- Index of aviation articles
- Turbulator
- Boundary layer suction
- Boundary layer control
- Circulation control wing
