= Hillson Bi-mono =

Bi-mono
- 3-way drawing

General information
- Type: Experimental aircraft
- National origin: United Kingdom
- Manufacturer: F Hills & Sons
- Number built: 1

History
- First flight: 1941

The Hillson Bi-mono was a British experimental aircraft of the 1940s. It was designed to test the idea of "slip-wings", where the aircraft could take off as a biplane, jettison the upper, disposable wing, and continue flying as a monoplane. A single example was built, which successfully demonstrated jettisoning of the slip wing in flight.

== Design and development ==
In the 1930s, as take-off weights of aircraft continued to increase, designers grew increasingly concerned about the effects that these weights would have on take-off runs, and several designers investigated the concept of a "slip-wing", which could be jettisoned after take-off. Amongst the proponents of the "slip-wing" was Noel Pemberton Billing, the founder of Supermarine, who wrote several articles in the aviation press promoting the idea, either with a manned, reusable auxiliary wing, or a disposable or "scrap-wing". Blackburn Aircraft also investigated "slip-wings".

Following the outbreak of the Second World War, F Hills and Son, a light aircraft manufacturer based at Trafford Park, Manchester offered a design for a light fighter aircraft to the British Air Ministry. The fighter would be cheap to build and could be operated from small fields or open roads. To give the required take-off performance, the design was to be fitted with a disposable "slip-wing". While the proposal was not accepted by the Air Ministry, Hills and Sons decided to continue with the project as a private venture, and so built a scale test-bed, to prove the slip-wing process.

The test bed, known as the Bi-mono, was a small tractor monoplane with a fabric-covered steel-tube construction fuselage and a wooden wing. It had a fixed tailwheel undercarriage while an enclosed cockpit was provided for the pilot. The auxiliary wing was attached to the top of the cockpit canopy and to the lower wing by interplane struts. Two different upper wings were flown. The one used initially had a wingspan of 32 ft (9.8 m) but the later, shorter wing's span of 20 ft (6.1 m) was the same as that of the lower one. The aircraft was powered by a single de Havilland Gipsy Six engine.

The Bi-mono was not the only slip-wing project built by Hills and Sons, as they were also contracted by Pemberton Billing to build his PB.37 design for a slip-wing dive-bomber, with a pusher monoplane lower component powered by a 290 hp (216 kW) engine, while the manned slip-wing upper component was a tractor monoplane powered by a 40 hp (30 kW) engine. Construction work started on the PB.37 early in 1940, but work was abandoned in July 1940 when construction was almost finished but the aircraft was unflown.

== Operational history ==
The Bi-mono, which carried no serial number or civil registration, made its maiden flight from Barton Aerodrome during 1941. Test flights were made both as a monoplane and as a biplane, with the shorter upper wing being chosen. In order to avoid the potential hazards to people on the ground of dropping the wing, wing jettisoning tests were carried out from Squires Gate Airport, Blackpool, with the upper wing being successfully dropped over the Irish Sea on 16 July 1941. The test proved successful, with no great change in trim and a few hundred feet in altitude being lost when the upper wing was jettisoned.

The Bi-mono was subject to further testing by the Aeroplane and Armament Experimental Establishment at Boscombe Down from October 1941. The A&AEE found that the maximum speed of the biplane configuration was slower than the stalling speed of the monoplane configuration. Its landing characteristics were likened to a kangaroo.

Hills and Sons went on to further develop the slip-wing concept, flying the Hillson FH.40, a Hawker Hurricane fitted with a slip-wing.

== Specifications (short upper wing) ==
Data from Nothing Ventured...Part 1"

General characteristics

- Crew: 1
- Length: 19 ft 6 in (5.94 m)
- Wingspan: 20 ft 0 in (6.10 m)
- Height: 7 ft 0 in (2.13 m) as biplane - 6 ft 4 in (1.93 m) as monoplane
- Wing area: 132 sq ft (12.3 m^{2}) as biplane - 66 sq ft (6.13 m^{2}) as monoplane
- Airfoil: Lower wing RAF 34, Upper wing Clark Y
- Gross weight: 1,940 lb (880 kg) (biplane)
- Powerplant: 1 × de Havilland Gipsy Six air-cooled six-cylinder inline engine, 200 hp (150 kW)
