= Antonov An-72 =

Transport aircraft by Antonov

An-72 Cheburashka
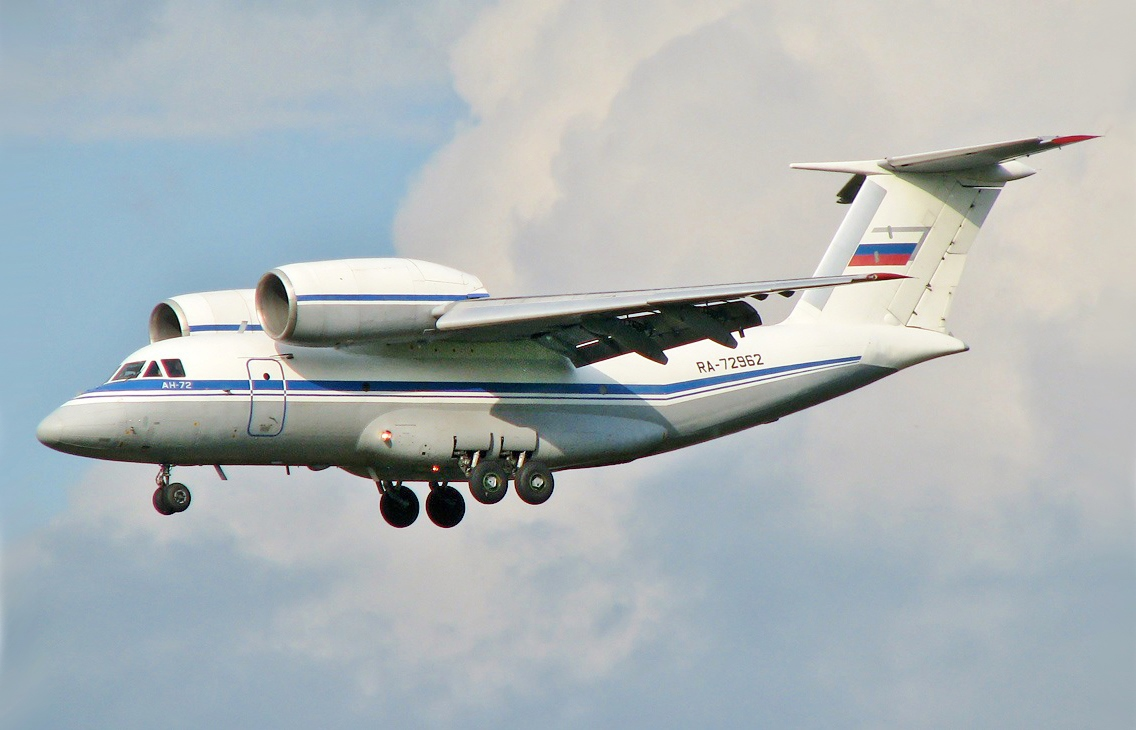
- A Russian Air Force An-72 on short final in to Chkalovsky Airport

General information
- Type: Transport aircraft
- National origin: Soviet Union
- Manufacturer: Antonov
- Status: In service
- Primary users: Russian Aerospace Forces: Russian Navy; Angolan Air Force; Soviet Air Force (historical)
- Number built: 133

History
- Manufactured: 1977–2002
- First flight: 31 August 1977
- Developed into: Antonov An-71; Antonov An-74

The Antonov An-72 (NATO reporting name: Coaler) is a transport aircraft, developed and produced by the Ukrainian aircraft manufacturer Antonov. The An-72 and the related An-74 get their nickname, Cheburashka, from the large engine intake ducts, which resemble the oversized ears of the popular Soviet animated character of the same name.

Design work on the An-72 commenced during the early 1970s, likely as the Soviet Union's response to the American Advanced Medium STOL Transport (AMST) programme that was ultimately terminated. It was developed in relative secrecy as a short takeoff and landing (STOL) transport aircraft and was intended to serve as a jet-powered replacement for the Antonov An-26. The An-72 made the use of the Coandă effect to improve its STOL performance by directing engine exhaust gases over the upper surface of the wing to boost lift. This performance directed numerous other design features across the aircraft, including its use of a T-tail and the specifics of its flight control system. It was also equipped with an automatic navigation system and a robust undercarriage, the latter feature facilitated the use of austere airstrips.

The An-72's maiden flight took place on 31 August 1977. Quantity production did not proceed until the late 1980s, although the type did see active service with the Soviet Air Force prior to its dissolution. The An-72's export prospects had been hampered by the airlifter's development being concealed even from Western certifying bodies. Following the dissolution of the Soviet Union, various successor states, including Russia and Ukraine, inherited the type and continued to operate it. In addition to its use as a military airlifter, some An-72 variants have found success as commercial freighters with various airlines operating the type. An An-72 derivative, the An-74, is designed to operate under the harsh weather conditions of the polar regions.

== Design and development ==
The origins of the An-72 can be traced back to the 1970s; early work on the programme appears to have been performed under a high level of secrecy. It has been speculated that the An-72's development had been initiated as a Soviet response to the American Advanced Medium STOL Transport (AMST) that had been initiated during the 1960s, but ultimately never resulted in any production aircraft. (Note: "An-72 Coaler (Antonov)". GlobalSecurity.org. 9 July 2011.) Aviation author Bill Sweetman observed that the An-72 bore a close resemblance to the Boeing YC-14, one of the AMST designs that had been submitted to the United States Air Force as a prospective tactical airlifter. Officially, the primary purpose of the An-72 programme was to produce a successor to the turboprop-powered Antonov An-26.

The An-72 was powered by a pair of Lotarev D-36 turbofan engines (these have previously been used on the Yakovlev Yak-42); (Note: Penney, Stewart (4 August 1999). "Military Aircraft Directory Part 1". London, UK: FlightGlobal.) these were mounted in a relatively high over-wing position that was relatively close to the centreline, which allowed the aircraft to make use of the Coandă effect (another benefit was to reduce instances of foreign object damage). A substantial portion of the aircraft's design was shaped by this use of jet deflection across the upper surface of the wing; beyond the positioning of the engines, a T-tail configuration was also necessary in order to keep the tail plane clear of the engine wake. This T-tail was equipped with a swept fin, which helped to lengthen the tail moment arm and to accommodate trim changes. The wing of the AN-72, unlike the straight wing of the YC-14, is swept and a noticeable anhedral; the centre section is unswept. It is furnished with multiple flaps, which move on tracks; the outboard flaps are double-slotted while slats are also fitted on the leading edge.

The fuselage of the An-72 was sized to provide slightly greater internal width than that of the preceding An-26. A large nose radome is usually fitted. The landing gear comprises four independent single-wheel main gear legs that retract inwards into sizable fairings. The automatic flight control system was believed to be particularly challenging to develop due to the aircraft's STOL capabilities. An automatic navigation system that incorporated a Doppler radar unit was also installed. The An-72 is capable of operating from austere airstrips even under icy conditions; specifically, the combination of a robust undercarriage and high-flotation tyres permit operations on sand, grass, or other unpaved surfaces. The rear fuselage of the aircraft has a hinged loading ramp with a rear fairing that slides backwards and up to clear the opening. Up to 7.5 tonnes (7.4 long tons; 8.3 short tons) can be airdropped. The cabin featured side-mounted folding seats for up to 52 passengers, as well as provisioned for up to 24 casualties in litters along with 12 seated personnel and an attendant in a medical evacuation configuration.

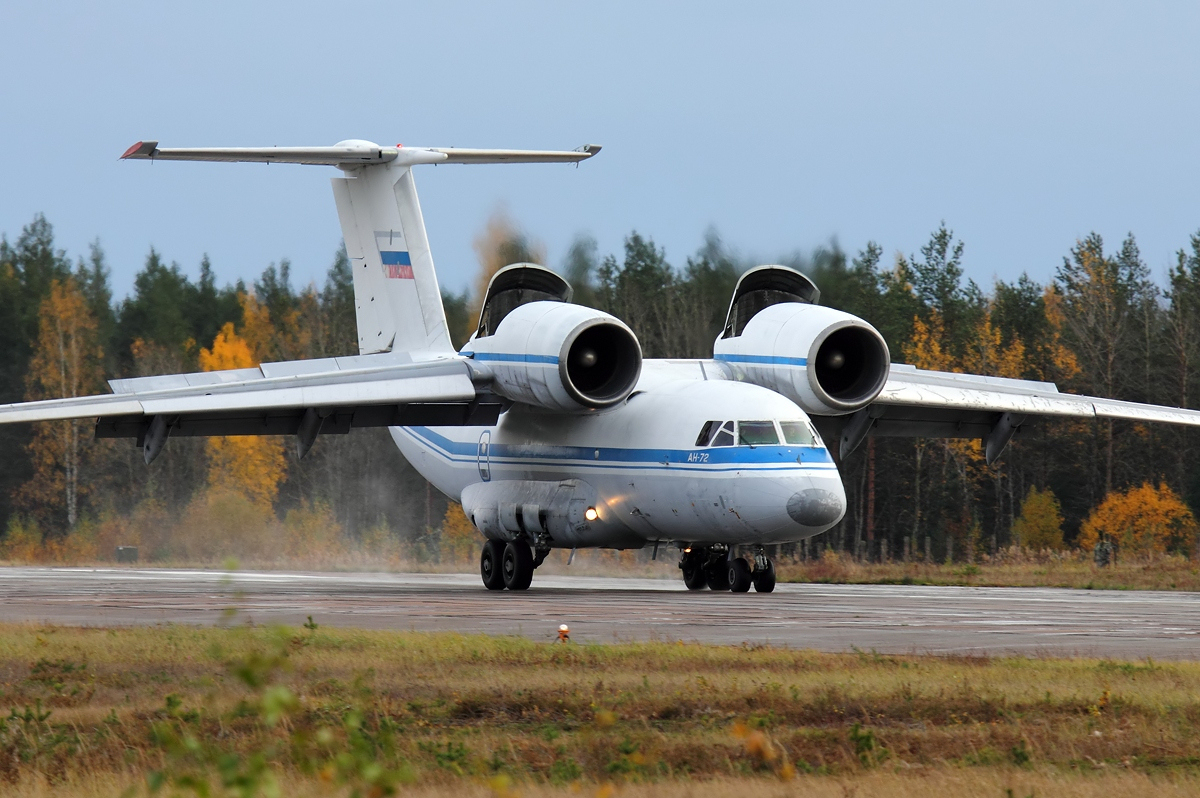
The unusual engine placement on the An-72, which permits the use of the Coandă effect to achieve improved STOL performance

On 31 August 1977, the prototype An-72 performed its maiden flight; its STOL capabilities were not used during the initial flight. At the time, there was no other aircraft in the same class as the An-72 on account of its capabilities and the limited perceived market for such a specialised airlifter in Western nations. Despite this, its export prospects were hindered from the onset due to the type having been developed in isolation from non-Soviet certificating authorities. Various refinements and modifications were made between the first prototype and production aircraft; these included the lengthening of the fuselage and an increase in wing span. By 1990, quantity production of the An-72 had commenced, 20 aircraft were being completed each year prior to the dissolution of the Soviet Union in the early 1990s.

Produced in tandem with the An-72 was the An-74 derivative. This aircraft is oriented around operations under the inhospitable weather conditions in polar regions, for which it can be outfitted with wheel-skis landing gear, de-icing equipment, and a number of other upgrades, allowing the aircraft to support activities in Arctic or Antarctic environments. Other An-72 versions include the An-72S VIP transport and An-72P maritime patrol aircraft. The An-72's STOL performance includes a take-off roll of 620 m (2,000 ft) and a landing distance of 420 m (1,400 ft).

== Operational history ==
In 2018, six An-72 aircraft were reported to be upgraded for the Russian Aerospace Forces and Navy to carry more fuel and payload for Arctic operations.

== Variants ==
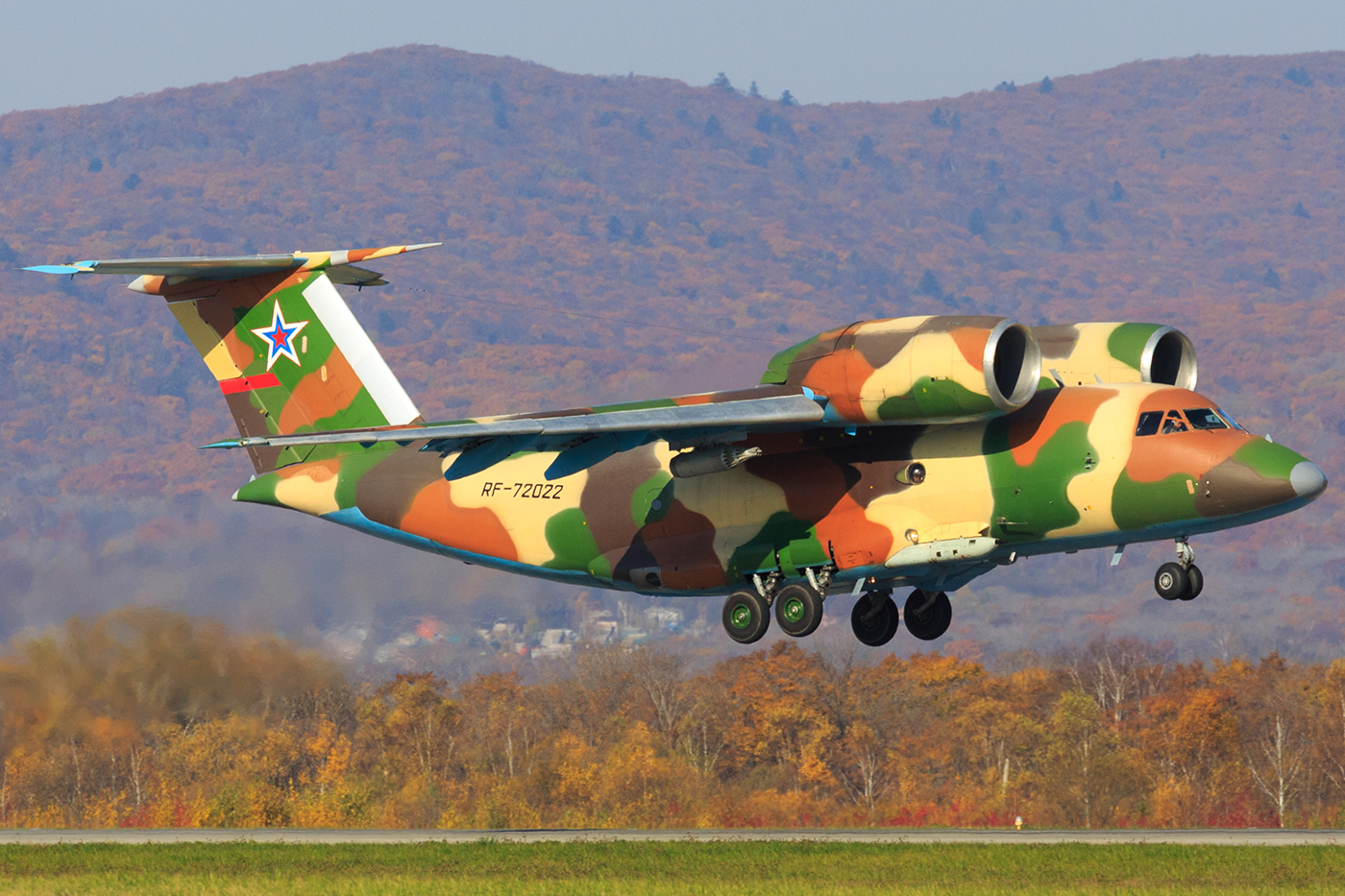
Russian Border Guard An-72P at Vladivostok Airport

- An-71 "Madcap": Prototype AWACS aircraft developed from the An-72.
- An-72 "Coaler-A": Preproduction aircraft. Two flying prototypes, one static test airframe and eight preproduction machines.
- An-72A "Coaler-C": Initial production STOL transport with a longer fuselage and increased wingspan.
- An-72AT – "Coaler-C": Freight version of the An-72A compatible with standard international shipping containers.
- An-72S – "Coaler-C": Executive VIP transport fitted with a galley in a front cabin, work and rest areas in a central cabin, and 24 armchairs in a rear cabin, can also be reconfigured for transporting freight or 38 passengers or as an air ambulance carrying eight stretchers.
- An-72P: Patrol aircraft. Armed with one 23 millimetres (0.91 in) GSh-23L cannon plus bombs and/or rockets.
- An-72R (also known as An-72BR): Prototype electronic intelligence (ELINT) aircraft, with conformal antenna fairings running up each side of the fuselage. Known as 'Aircraft 88' during development and erroneously known as An-88.
- An-72-100: Demilitarized An-72.
- An-72-100D: Demilitarized An-72S.
- An-74: Arctic/Antarctic support model with room for five crew, increased fuel capacity, larger radar in bulged nose radome, improved navigation equipment, better de-icing equipment, and can be fitted with wheel-skis landing gear.

== Operators ==
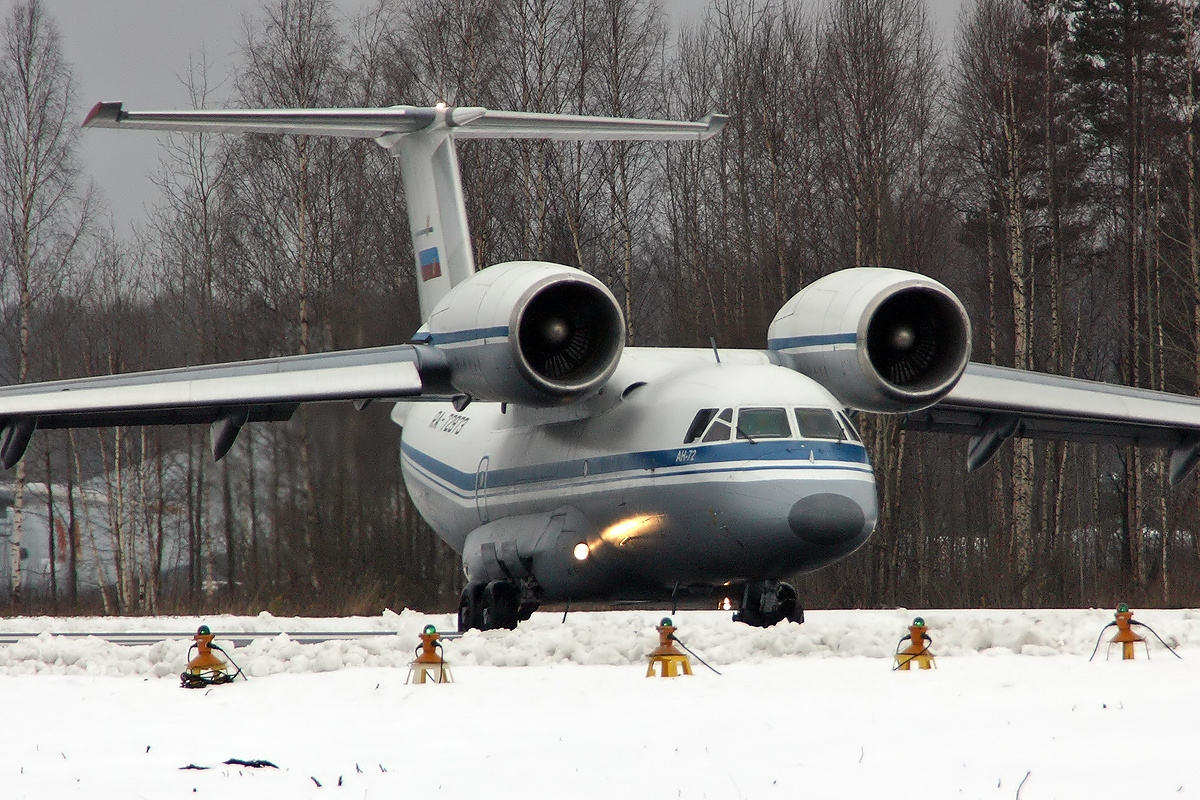
A Russian Navy An-72 showing the front view that resembles 'Cheburashka'.

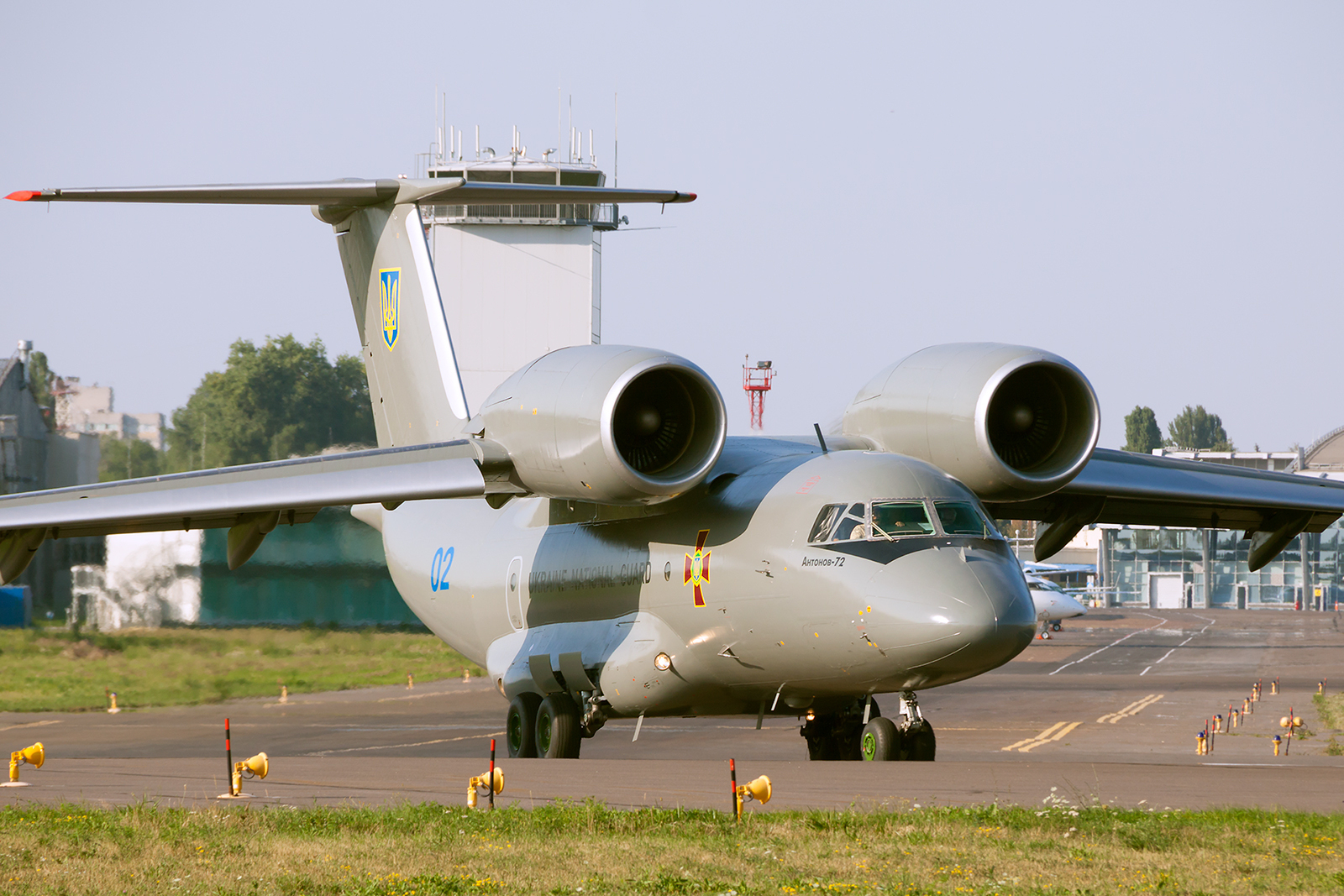
Ukraine National Guard An-72 at Zhulyany Airport

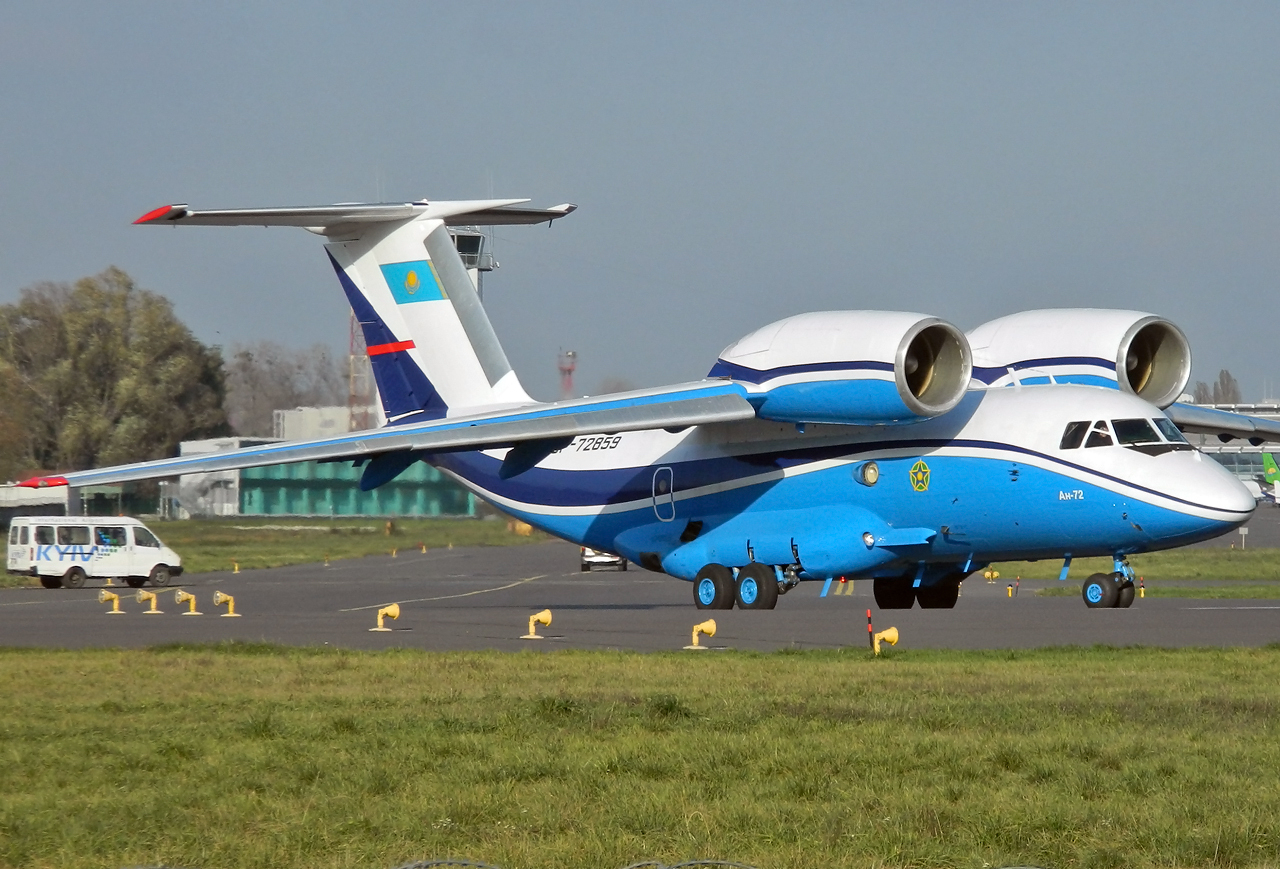
Kazakhstan Border Guard Antonov An-72-100

=== Civilian operators ===
In August 2006, 51 An-72 and Antonov An-74 aircraft were in airline service. The major operators included Badr Airlines (three), and Shar Ink (eight). Motor Sich Airlines (one). Some 17 other airlines operated this aircraft.

=== Military operators ===
As of February 2026, 51 aircraft were in military service.

- Angola
  - Angolan Air Force
- Equatorial Guinea
  - Equatorial Guinea Air Corps
- Kazakhstan
  - Kazakhstan Air Force
- Libya
  - Libyan Air Force
- Russia
  - Russian Aerospace Forces
  - Russian Navy
- Sudan
  - Sudanese Air Force
- Ukraine
  - Ukrainian Air Guard
  - State Border Guard Service of Ukraine

=== Former military operators ===
- Democratic Republic of the Congo
  - Air Force of the Democratic Republic of the Congo
- Georgia
  - Georgian Air Force
- Moldova
  - Moldovan Air Force
- Peru
  - Peruvian Air Force
- Soviet Union
  - Soviet Air Force

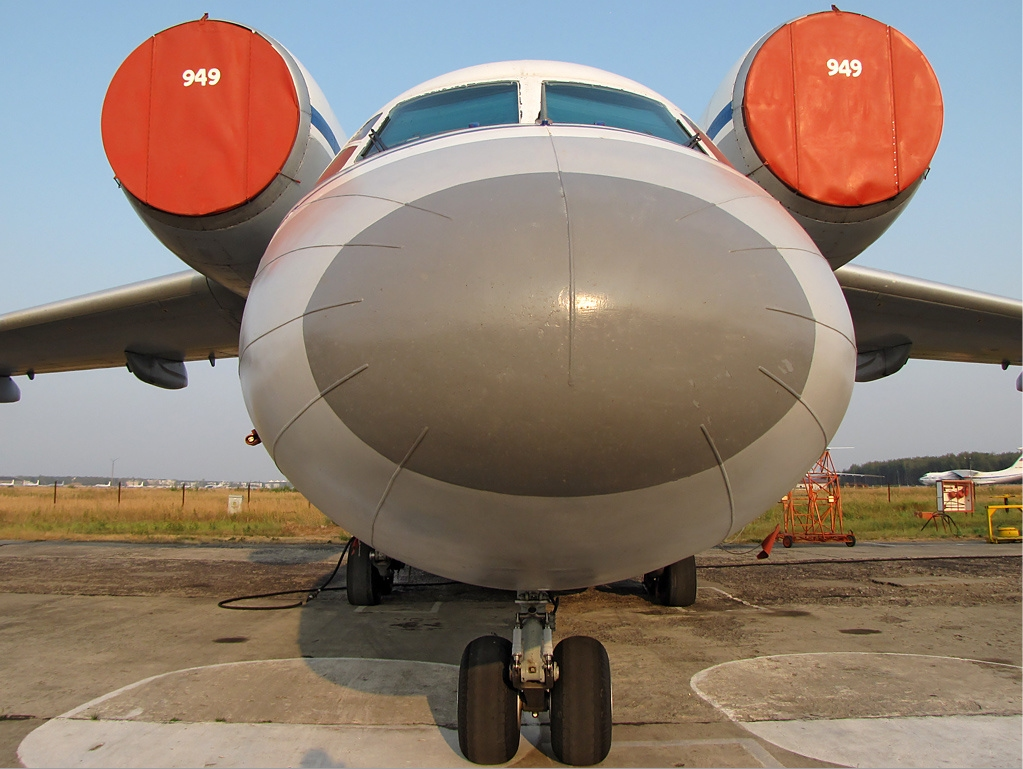
The An-72 is said to resemble Cheburashka when viewed from the front.

== Accidents and incidents ==
As of May 2022, there had been 24 known accidents and incidents involving the An-72 or An-74; of these, seven were reported to involve fatalities: (Note: "ASN Aviation Safety Database". Aviation Safety Network.)

- 10 February 1995 — An Antonov An-72 chase plane had a mid-air collision while following the Antonov An-70 prototype aircraft during a test flight. The collision caused the An-70 to crash into a forested area, killing all seven An-70 crew members. The An-72 lost a right wing flap, but it was able to return to base safely.
- 22 December 1997 — ER-ACF, an Antonov An-72 disappeared on a cargo flight from Port Bouet Airport, Côte d'Ivoire to Rundu Airport, Namibia. The aircraft and its five crew members disappeared without a trace over the South Atlantic. The cause of the incident remains undetermined.
- 21 April 2002 — ES-NOP, an Antonov An-72 leased by Enimex and operated by Trigana Air was damaged in a hard landing at Wamena, Indonesia and a minor fire broke out. Due to the nearest fire truck being inoperable, some firefighters ran to the accident scene with hand-held fire extinguishers. The delayed response led to unrecoverable damage to the aircraft, which had to be written off. There were no fatalities.
- 25 December 2012 — An An-72 carrying Kazakhstani border patrol officials crashed in Shymkent, killing all 27 people on board.
- 10 October 2019 — An An-72 operated for the DRC Air Force with 4 crew and 4 passengers crashed in Congo; none survived. (Note: "An-72 crash site located in Democratic Republic of Congo". TASS. Moscow. 11 October 2019.) (Note: "ASN Aircraft accident Antonov An-72 EK-72903 Kole". Aviation Safety Network.)
- 12 December 2024 — An An-72 operated by the Russian Navy exploded at the Ostafyevo airfield in the Moscow region. The explosion occurred from the detonation of the main power unit. The value of the destroyed aircraft was approximately US$4.5 million.
- 2 April 2026 — An An-72P variant in Kirovske operated by the Russian military was hit with a Ukrainian FP-2 missile by the Unmanned Systems Forces.

== Specifications (An-72) ==

Data from The Osprey Encyclopædia of Russian Aircraft 1875–1995

General characteristics

- Crew: five
- Capacity: up to 52 passengers or 10 tonnes of cargo
- Length: 28.07 m (92 ft 1 in)
- Wingspan: 31.89 m (104 ft 7.5 in)
- Height: 8.65 m (28 ft 4.5 in)
- Wing area: 98.62 m^{2} (1,062 sq ft)
- Empty weight: 19,050 kg (42,000 lb)
- Gross weight: 34,500 kg (76,058 lb)
- Powerplant: 2 × Lotarev D-36 series 1A Turbofan, 63.9 kN (14,330 lbf) thrust each

Performance

- Maximum speed: 700 km/h (435 mph, 378 kn)
- Range: 4,325 km (2,688 mi, 2,336 nmi)

== See also ==
Related development

- Antonov An-71
- Antonov An-74
- Antonov An-148
- Antonov An-178

Aircraft of comparable role, configuration, and era

- Boeing YC-14

Related lists

- List of military aircraft of the Soviet Union and the CIS
- List of STOL aircraft
- List of aircraft
