= Antonov An-74 =

Soviet/Ukrainian military transport aircraft

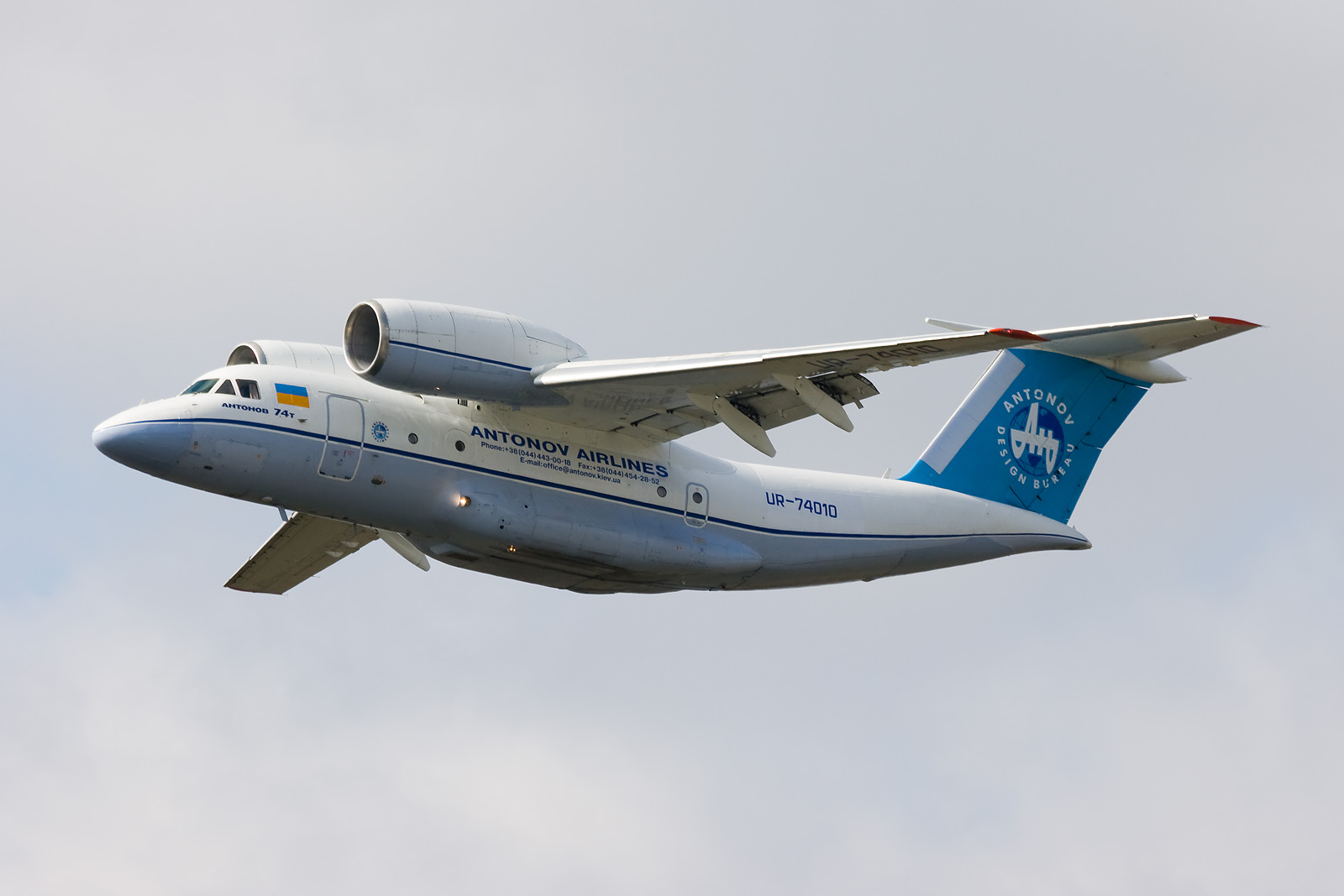
- An An-74T formerly operated by Antonov Airlines

General information
- Type: Transport aircraft
- National origin: Soviet Union / Ukraine
- Manufacturer: Antonov
- Status: In service
- Primary users: Islamic Revolutionary Guard Corps Aerospace Force Utair; Egyptian Air Force; Pouya Air
- Number built: 62

History
- Manufactured: 1986–2004
- Introduction date: 1983
- First flight: September 29, 1983
- Developed from: Antonov An-72

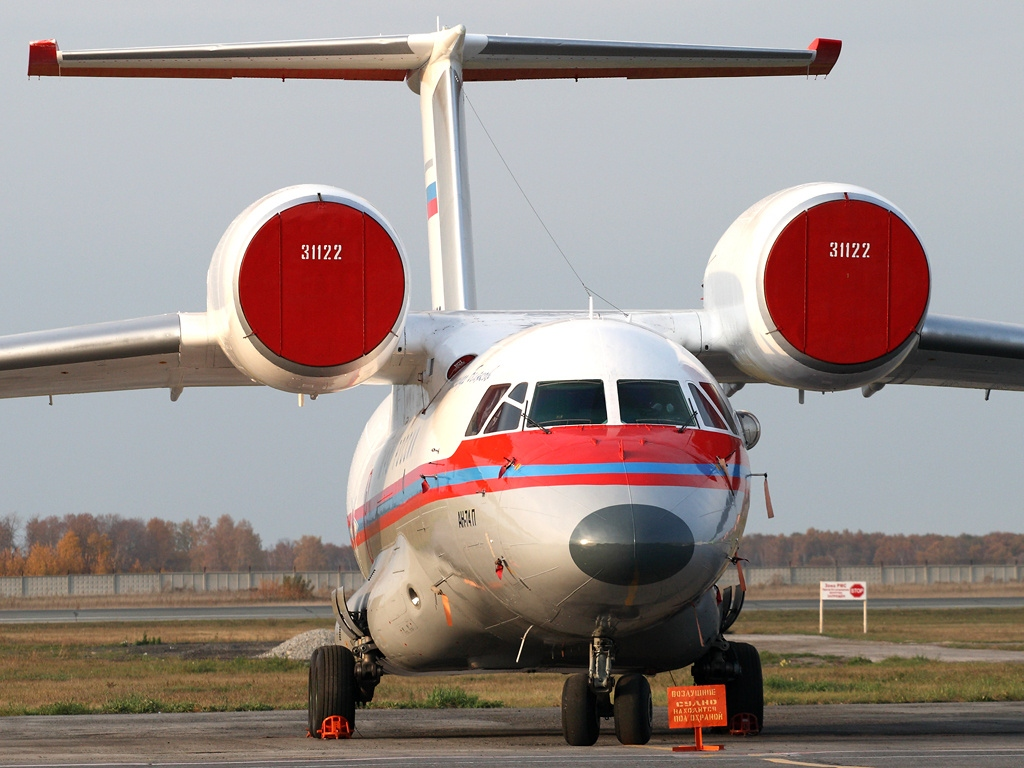
Front view which suggested the nickname "Cheburashka"

The Antonov An-74 (Russian: Антонов Ан-74, NATO reporting name: Coaler) is a Soviet/Ukrainian transport aircraft developed by Antonov. It is a development of the An-72, with upgraded equipment, upgraded radar, extended range, a crew of five, a larger avionics bay and capabilities to be equipped with ski gear. Production ceased in 2004.

The An-72 and An-74 get their nickname, Cheburashka, from the large engine intake ducts, which resemble the oversized ears of the popular Soviet animated character of the same name.

== Design and development ==
The An-74 was initially an upgrade of the An-72 test aircraft, intended to be used in the Arctic and Antarctica; and had the designation An-72A "Arctic". The aircraft's main purpose is to deliver cargo, equipment and personnel over short- and medium-range routes in any climatic conditions ranging from −60 to 45 °C (−76 to 113 °F) and at any latitude, including the North Pole, and high altitudes. It can operate to and from low grade airstrips such as concrete, pebble, ice and snow aerodromes.

Produced in tandem with the An-72, the An-74 can be fitted with wheel-ski landing gear, de-icing equipment and a number of other upgrades allowing the aircraft to support operations in Arctic or Antarctic environments.

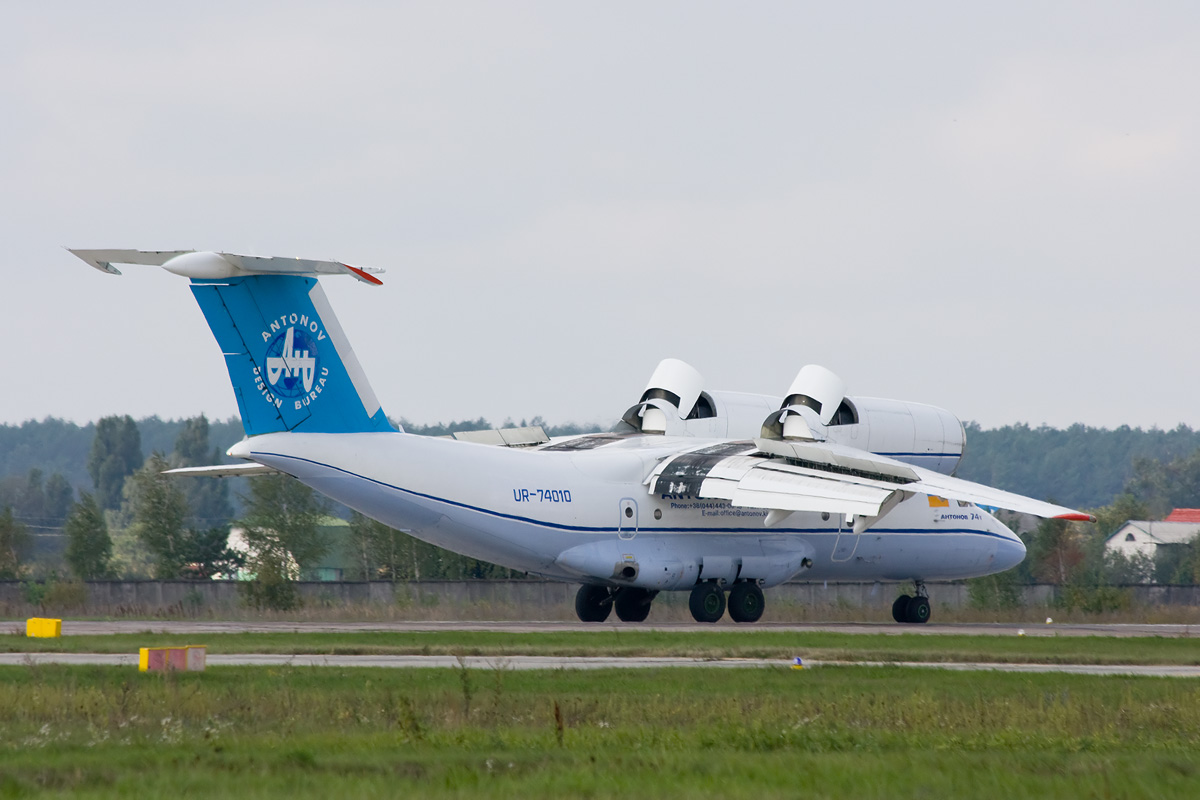
An-74 on landing with thrust reversers deployed

An unusual design feature of the An-74 (as well as An-72) is the use of the Coandă effect to improve STOL performance, utilizing engine exhaust gases blown over the wing's upper surface to boost lift. The powerplant used is the Lotarev D-36 turbofan engine. The An-74 bears some resemblance to the Boeing YC-14, a prototype design from the early 1970s which had also used overwing engines and the Coandă effect.

The rear fuselage of the aircraft has a hinged loading ramp with a rear fairing that slides backwards and up to clear the opening. The An-74 has a payload of around 11 tons including up to ten passengers in the cargo version, or up to 52 seats in the passenger version; the operating ceiling is 10,100 metres (33,100 ft) and cruising speed is 550 to 700 kilometres per hour (300 to 380 kn; 340 to 430 mph). The aircraft may also be used for highly specialized operations:

- pilotage and vessel escort;
- establishing and servicing of drifting stations;
- research operations in Arctic or Antarctic regions;
- visual ice patrol;
- fishery reconnaissance.

== Operational history ==
The first An-74 flight took place on September 29, 1983, four years after the An-72, its parent aircraft. Almost immediately after, cold-weather testing and Arctic operations began taking place, fulfilling the intentions of the aircraft designers. Notably, an An-74 evacuated the crew of Arctic station SP-32 on March 6, 2004.

As of January 1, 2006, twenty-three out of thirty aircraft registered in Russia were in operation.

== Variants ==
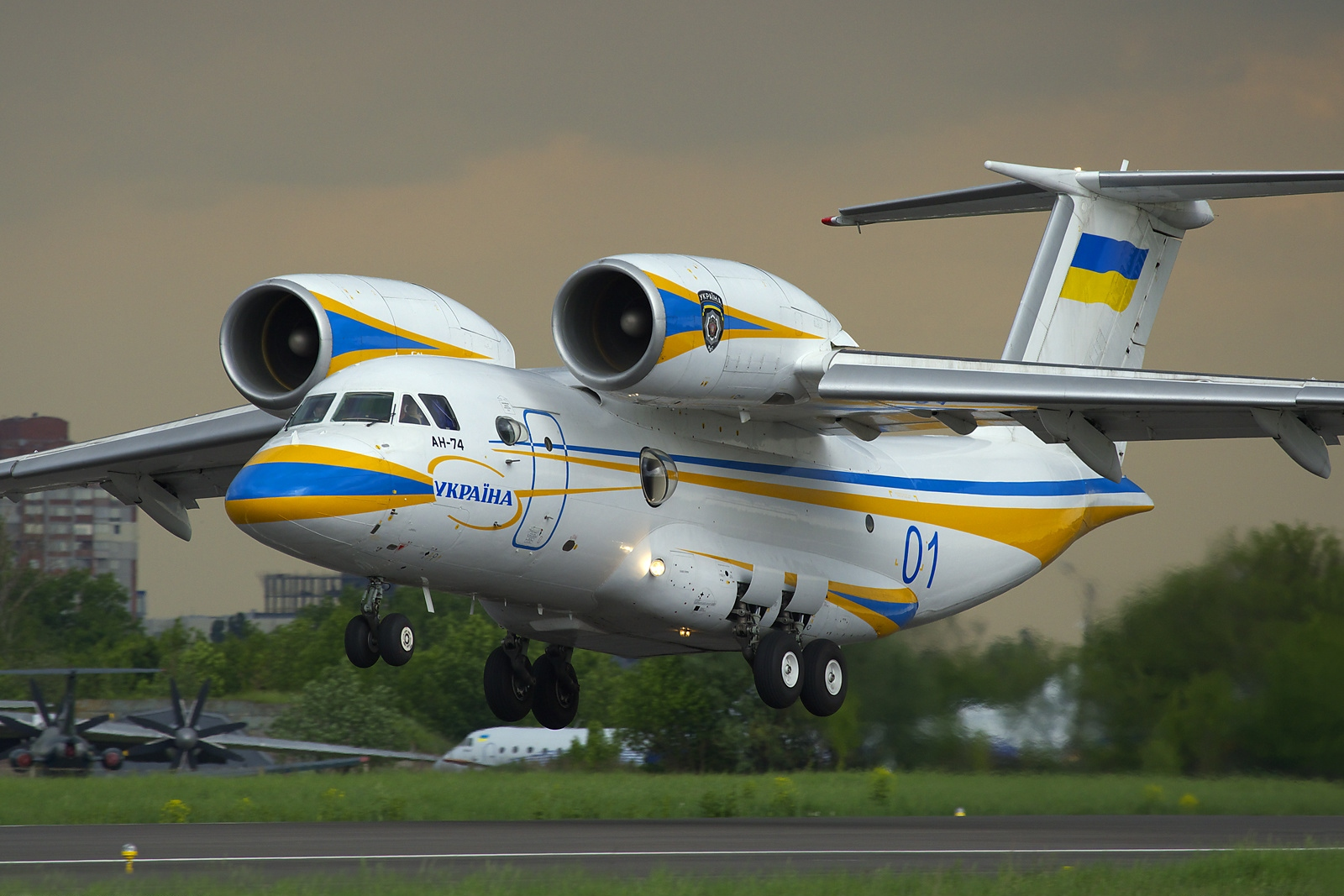
Ministry of Internal Affairs of Ukraine An-74TK-200VIP

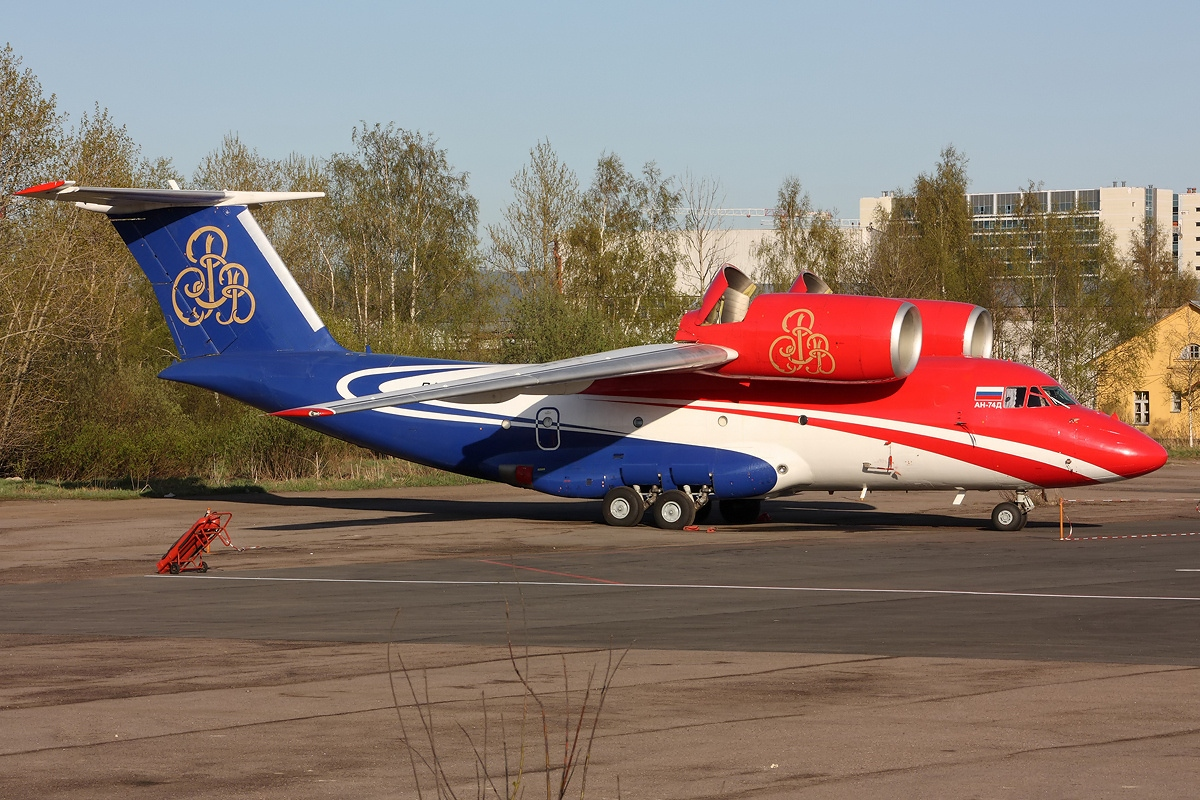
Shar Ink An-74D

- An-74: Arctic/Antarctic support model with room for five crew, increased fuel capacity, larger radar in bulged nose radome, improved navigation equipment, better de-icing equipment, and can be fitted with wheel-skis landing gear.
- An-74-200: Military transport based on the An-74T
- An-74-200D: VIP/executive transport version of the An-74TK-200. Also called An-74D.
- An-74A: Passenger or freighter model.
- An-74MP: Marine Patrol version. Can transport 44 soldiers, 22 paratroops, 16 stretchers with medical staff, or ten tonnes of cargo.
- An-74T: Freighter version equipped with an internal winch, roller equipment, and cargo mooring points, can also be fitted with static lines for paratroops or dropping air cargo.
- An-74T-100: Cargo version with four crew.
- An-74T-200: Cargo version with two crew.
- An-74T-200A: Military Transport aircraft
- An-74TK-100: Convertible version of the An-74T-100. It could be configured for passengers, cargo or both.
- An-74TK-100S: Medevac version of An-74TK-100.
- An-74TK-200: Convertible version of the An-74T-200.
- An-74TK-200C: Cargo variant of An-74TK-200
- An-74TK-200S: Medevac version of An-74T-200.
- An-74TK-300: Combi aircraft with underslung engines. Developed into the An-148.
- An-74TK-300D: VIP version of An-74TK-300.
- An-74-400: Proposed stretch model of the An-74TK-300 with a fuselage insert to extend its length by 26 ft (8 m) and uprated engines. Also called An-174.
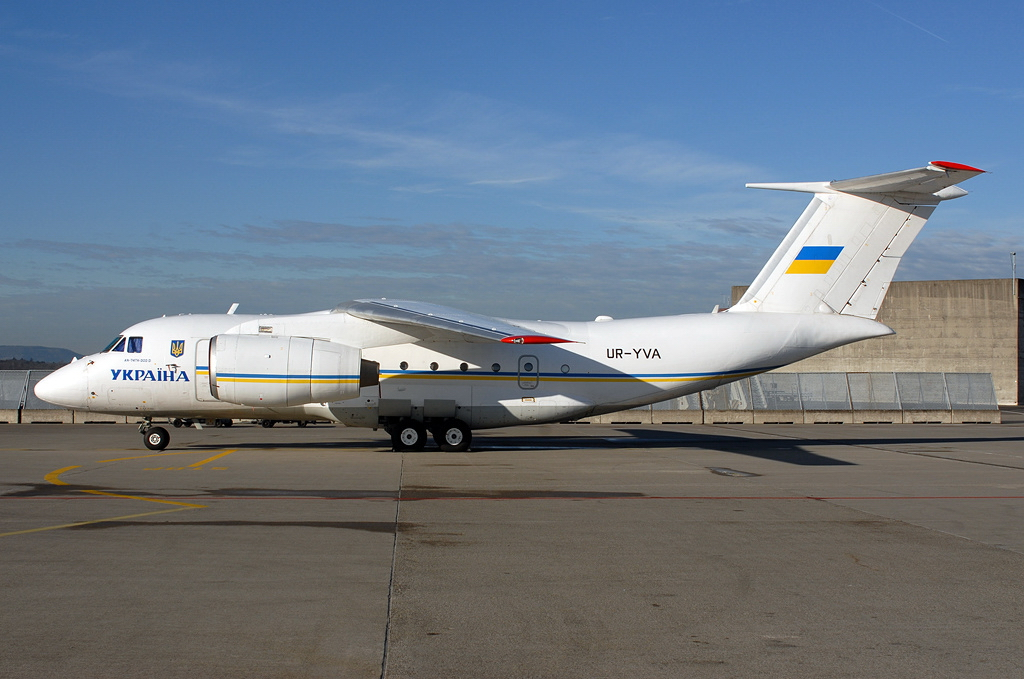
- The An-74TK-300D variant, with underslung engines
  An-148: An-74 model designed primarily for civil customers with more fuel-efficient, conventionally mounted engines that trade the STOL capabilities of earlier models for lower operating costs and higher speed. Additional emphasis is placed on improved avionics and passenger comfort features. It was initially designated An-74TK-300, making its first flight in 2004.

== Operators ==
=== Civilian ===
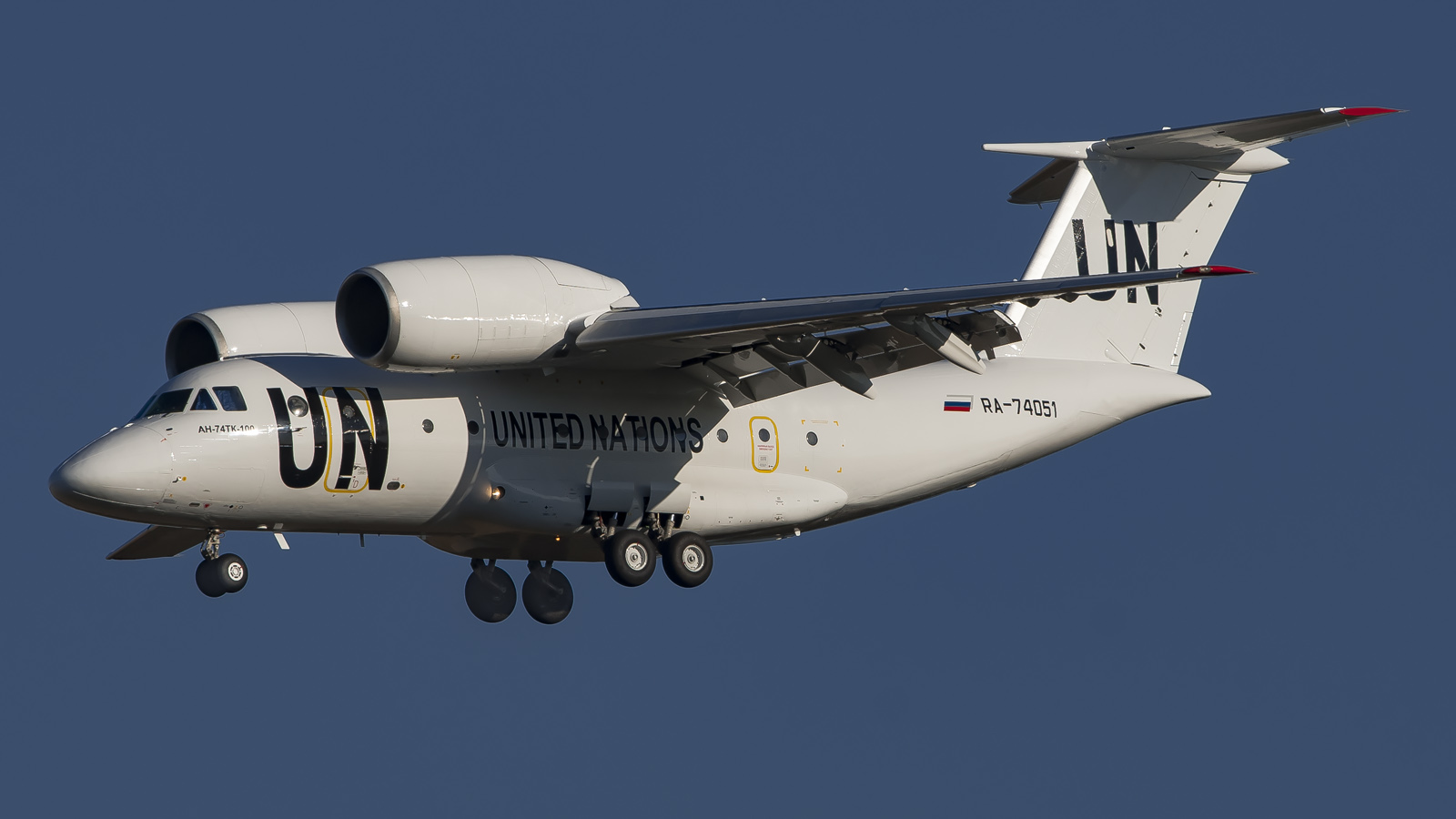
An UTair Cargo An-74TK-100 with United Nations livery

Iran

- Pouya Air

Russia

- UTair Cargo
- Shar Ink
- 2nd Sverdlovsk Air Enterprise

Ukraine

- Motor Sich Airlines
- Constanta Airline

=== Military ===
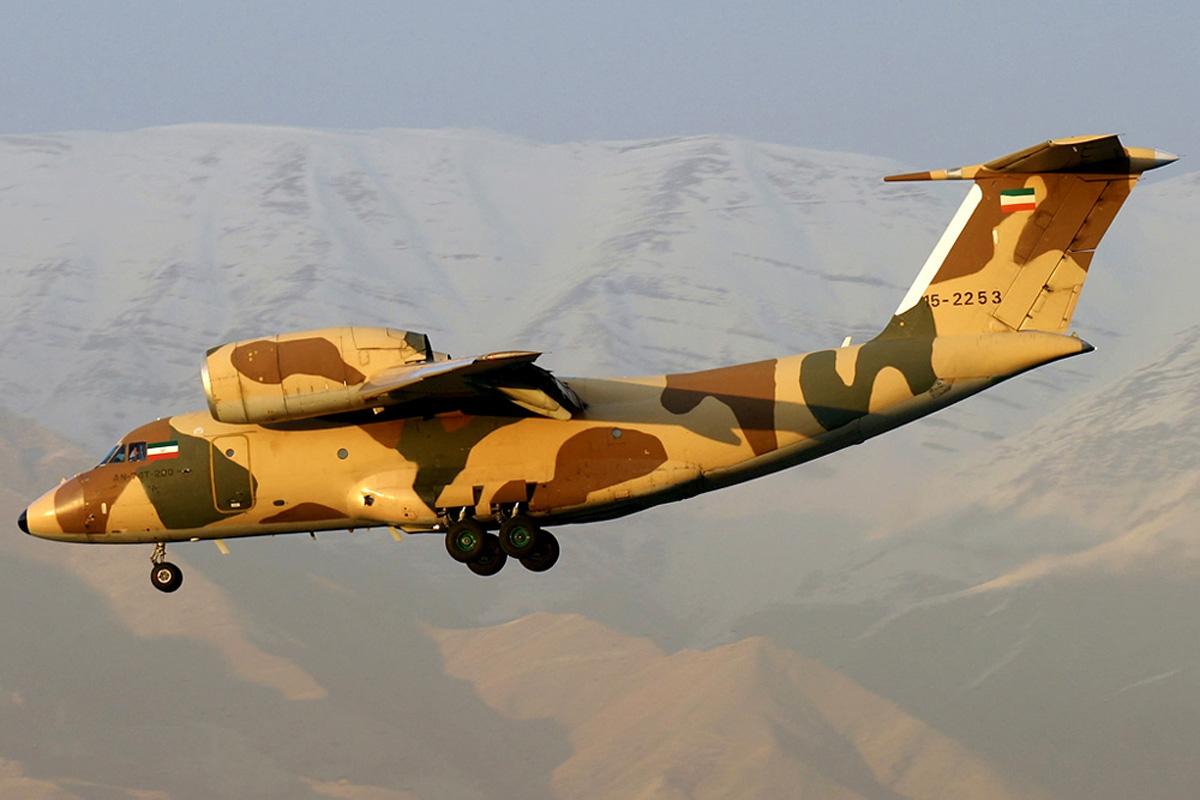
An An-74TK-200 of the Iranian Islamic Revolutionary Guard Corps

Egypt

- Egyptian Air Force: Three (An-74T-200A). Options for six additional aircraft were not exercised.

Iran

- Iranian Revolutionary Guard: Four (An-74TK-200), seven (An-74T-200);

Turkmenistan

- Turkmen Air Force: Two (An-74TK-200)

== Notable accidents and incidents ==
- On 16 September 1991, an An-74 carrying a cargo shipment of fish from Petropavlovsk-Kamchatskiy to Kyiv via Lensk and Omsk crashed after takeoff from Lensk Airport, killing all 13 people on board. The cause of the accident was an overloading of the aircraft, combined with the premature retraction of the wing flaps.
- On 23 April 2006, a Libyan Air Force An-74TK-200 carrying food aid to Chad crashed near the village of Kousséri in neighbouring Cameroon after abandoning its landing at N'Djamena. All six Ukrainian crew members were confirmed dead.
- On 27 November 2006, an Iranian Revolutionary Guards Corps Antonov An-74, serial number 15-2255, crashed on takeoff at Tehran Mehrabad Airport. There were 37 fatalities, out of 38 occupants on board the aircraft.
- On 30 March 2010, an An-74 (RA-74017) operated by the Russian Federal Security Service (FSB) crashed during takeoff at Ivanovo Severny Air Base. The thrust reverser on the left engine reportedly deployed accidentally, causing the aircraft to veer off the runway. There were no fatalities, but the aircraft was damaged beyond repair.
- On 17 May 2014, a Lao People's Liberation Army Air Force An-74TK-300 carrying Laos Defence Minister Douangchay Phichit and other senior officials crashed in the north of the country in the Xiangkhouang Province, nearly 500 kilometres (310 mi) from the capital Vientiane.
- On 29 July 2017, An-74TK100 UR-CKC of CAVOK Air crashed on take-off from São Tomé International Airport and was damaged beyond repair. A birdstrike was reported and the aircraft overran the end of the runway whilst attempting to abort the take-off.
- On 3 August 2020, An-74TK-100 RA-74044 of UTair was written off during a runway excursion after arriving at Gao International Airport, Mali from Modibo Keita International Airport. The aircraft had been carrying out operations for the United Nations task force MINUSMA. No fatalities were reported, but all 11 people on board sustained injuries of varying severity.
- On 24 February 2022, an unknown Antonov An-74 was reported to have been destroyed by Russian artillery along with the Antonov An-225 and other aircraft in the battle in Hostomel, Kyiv.

== Specifications ==
Data from The Osprey Encyclopaedia of Russian Aircraft 1875–1995

General characteristics

- Crew: five (captain, first officer, navigator, flight engineer, loadmaster)
- Capacity: up to 52 passengers
- Length: 28.07 m (92 ft 1 in)
- Wingspan: 31.89 m (104 ft 7.5 in)
- Height: 8.65 m (28 ft 4.5 in)
- Wing area: 98.62 m^{2} (1,062 sq ft)
- Empty weight: 19,050 kg (42,000 lb)
- Gross weight: 34,500 kg (76,058 lb)
- Powerplant: 2 × Lotarev D-36 series 1A , 63.9 kN (14,330 lbf) thrust each

Performance

- Maximum speed: 700 km/h (435 mph, 378 kn)
- Cruise speed: 550 or 600 km/h (342 or 373 mph, 297 or 324 kn)
- Range: 4,325 km (2,688 mi, 2,336 nmi)
- Service ceiling: 10,100 m (33,136 ft)

== See also ==
Related development

- Antonov An-71
- Antonov An-72
- Antonov An-148
- Antonov An-178

Aircraft of comparable role, configuration, and era

- Boeing YC-14
- Embraer C-390
- Kawasaki C-2

Related lists

- List of military aircraft of the Soviet Union and the CIS
- List of STOL aircraft
- List of aircraft
