= AMST =

AMST may refer to:

- Academy for Medical Science Technology, part of high school Bergen County Academies in New Jersey, US
- Advanced Medium STOL Transport
- Academy of Medical Sciences and Technology, Khartoum
