= List of STOL aircraft =

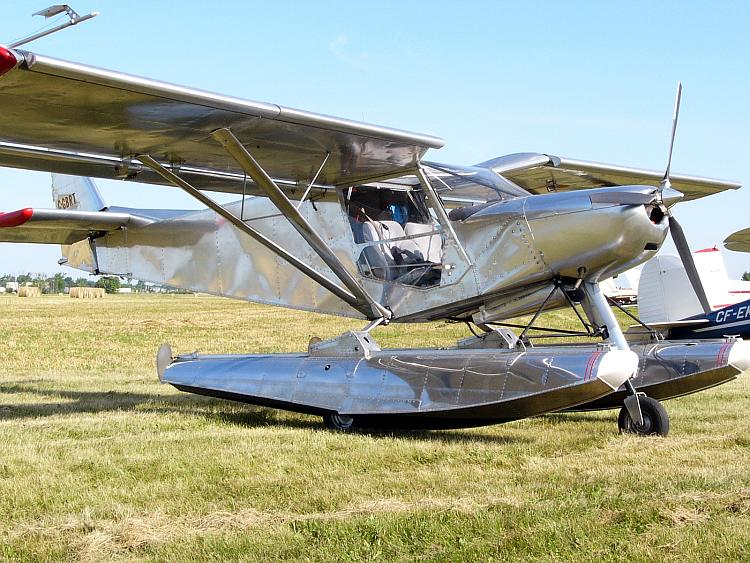
A typical purpose-designed light STOL aircraft, the Zenith STOL CH 701

This is a list of aircraft which classified as having Short Takeoff and Landing, or STOL, characteristics.

The STOL class excludes vertical takeoff and landing (VTOL) types, rotorcraft, aerostats and most light aircraft.

== List of aircraft ==
Type	Country	Date	Role	Status	Take-off to 50 ft (15 m)	Landing from 50 ft (15 m)	Notes
AAC Angel	US	1984	Utility	Production	1,404 ft (428 m)	1,046 ft (319 m)	
Aircraft Industries L 410 NG	Czech Republic	2015	Utility	Production	1,936 ft (590 m)	1,969 ft (600 m)	
Antonov An-14	Soviet Union	1958	Transport	Production	656 ft (200 m)	985 ft (300 m)	
Antonov An-72	Soviet Union	1977	Transport	Production	1,312 ft (400 m)	1,148 ft (350 m)	
Auster AOP.9	UK	1954	Artillery observer	Production	675 ft (206 m)	150 ft (46 m)	
Australian Aircraft Kits Hornet STOL	Australia	2004	Ultralight	Production	656 ft (200 m)	623 ft (190 m)	
Bounsall Super Prospector	US	1990	Homebuilt	Production	300 ft (91 m)	250 ft (76 m)	
Boeing YC-14	US	1976	Transport	Prototype (Cancelled)			
Britten-Norman Defender	UK	1970	Transport	Production	1,050 ft (320 m)	995 ft (303 m)	
Boeing/NASA C-8A AWJSRA	US	1972	Jet flap STOL research	Production			Augmented Wing Jet-flap STOL Research Aircraft
Britten-Norman Islander	UK	1965	Airliner	Production	1,100 ft (335 m)	960 ft (293 m)	
CASA C-212 Aviocar	Spain	1974	Transport	Production	2,001 ft (610 m)	1,516 ft (462 m)	Airliner, cargo and ground attack variants
Conroy Stolifter	US	1968	Utility	Prototype	450 ft (137 m)	400 ft (122 m)	Converted Cessna Skymaster.
De Havilland Canada DHC-2 Beaver Mk 1	Canada	1947	Transport	Production	1,015 ft (309 m)	1,000 ft (305 m)	
De Havilland Canada DHC-2 Beaver Mk III	Canada	1947	Transport	Production	920 ft (280 m)	870 ft (265 m)	
De Havilland Canada DHC-3 Otter	Canada	1951	Transport	Production	1,155 ft (352 m)	880 ft (268 m)	
De Havilland Canada DHC-4 Caribou	Canada	1959	Transport	Production	1,040 ft (317 m)	590 ft (180 m)	
De Havilland Canada DHC-5 Buffalo	Canada	1965	Utility	Production	2,100 ft (640 m)	2,100 ft (640 m)	
De Havilland Canada DHC-6 Twin Otter	Canada	1966	Utility	Production	1,200 ft (366 m)	1,050 ft (320 m)	
De Havilland Canada Dash 7	Canada	1975	Airliner	Production	1,200 ft (366 m)	1,050 ft (320 m)	
Dornier Do 27	Germany	1955	Utility	Production	558 ft (170 m)	525 ft (160 m)	
Dornier Do 28	Germany	1959	Utility	Production	1,020 ft (311 m)	1,000 ft (305 m)	
Dornier 228	Germany	1981	Utility	Production	2,600 ft (792 m)	1,480 ft (451 m)	
Dornier Do 29	Germany	1958	Utility	Prototype / research			
Dornier P.360	Germany	1967	Military transport aircraft	Prototype / research			Similar to Armstrong Whitworth AW.681
Evangel 4500	US	1964	Transport	Production	1,125 ft (343 m)	1,140 ft (347 m)	
Fieseler Fi 156 Storch	Germany	1936	Utility	Production	350 ft (107 m)	310 ft (94 m)	
Helio Courier H-295	US	1955	Utility	Production	610 ft (186 m)	520 ft (158 m)	"Helioplane #1" demonstrator first flew 1949
IAI Arava	Israel	1972	Transport	Production	984 ft (300 m)	902 ft (275 m)	
Javelin V6 STOL	US	1949	Homebuilt	Production	150 ft (46 m)	300 ft (91 m)	Piper PA-20 Pacer conversion.
Just Superstol	US	2012	Homebuilt	Production	550 ft (168 m)	450 ft (137 m)	
Kokusai Ki-76	Japan	1942	Liaison	Production			Inspired by the Fieseler Fi 156
Knapp Lil Cub	US	2013	Homebuilt	Prototype			
Let L-410 Turbolet	Czech Republic	1969	Utility	Production	1,673 ft (510 m)	1,640 ft (500 m)	
Maule M-5	US	1974	Utility	Production	550 ft (168 m)	600 ft (183 m)	
McDonnell Douglas YC-15	US	1975	Transport	Prototype (Cancelled)			
Murphy Radical	Canada	2016	Utility	Production	400 ft (122 m)	300 ft (91 m)	
NAL Quiet STOL research aircraft ASKA	Japan	1985	Research	Prototype			
NASA Quiet Short-Haul Research Aircraft	US	1974	Research	Prototype			
PAC P-750 XSTOL	New Zealand	2001	Utility	Production	1,196 ft (365 m)	950 ft (290 m)	
Peterson 260SE/Wren 460	US	1988	Utility	Production	1,000 ft (305 m)	1,000 ft (305 m)	Conversion of Cessna 182.
Pilatus PC-6 Porter	Switzerland	1959	Utility	Production	600 ft (183 m)	550 ft (168 m)	
Piper J-3 Cub	US	1938	Utility	Production	755 ft (230 m)	885 ft (270 m)	
PZL-104 Wilga	Poland	1962	Utility	Production	625 ft (191 m)	780 ft (238 m)	
PZL-105M	Poland	1989	Utility	Prototype	1,109 ft (338 m)	1,070 ft (326 m)	
Quest Kodiak	US	2005	Transport	Production	760 ft (232 m)	915 ft (279 m)	
Scottish Aviation Pioneer	UK	1947	Transport	Production	555 ft (169 m)	660 ft (201 m)	
Scottish Aviation Twin Pioneer	UK	1955	Transport	Production	1,071 ft (326 m)	870 ft (265 m)	
ShinMaywa US-2	Japan	2007	Air-Sea Rescue	Production	920 ft (280 m)	1,080 ft (329 m)	
Short SC.7 Skyvan	UK	1963	Transport	Production	1,050 ft (320 m)	1,485 ft (453 m)	
SIAI-Marchetti FN.333 Riviera	Italy	1952	Amphibian	Production	1,400 ft (427 m)	1,100 ft (335 m)	
SIAI-Marchetti SM.1019	Italy	1969	Utility	Production	1,185 ft (361 m)	922 ft (281 m)	
Slepcev Storch	Serbia	1994	Ultralight	Production	126 ft (38 m)	110 ft (34 m)	Scale replica of Fieseler Fi 156 Storch.
Spectrum SA-550	US	1983	Transport	Production	675 ft (206 m)	675 ft (206 m)	Converted Cessna Skymaster.
Sukhoi Su-80	Russian Federation	2001	Transport	Production	2,686 ft (819 m)	1,715 ft (523 m)	
Westland Lysander I	UK	1936	Army cooperation	Production	690 ft (210 m)	990 ft (300 m)	
Zenith STOL CH 701	US	1986	Trainer	Production	1,257 ft (383 m)	1,257 ft (383 m)	
Zenith STOL CH 801	US	2011	Homebuilt	Production	400 ft (122 m)	300 ft (91 m)	
Electra EL-2 Goldfinch	US	2023	demonstrator	testing	300 ft (91 m)	300 ft (91 m)	

== See also ==
- List of VTOL aircraft
