= McDonnell Douglas YC-15 =

American prototype military transport aircraft

YC-15
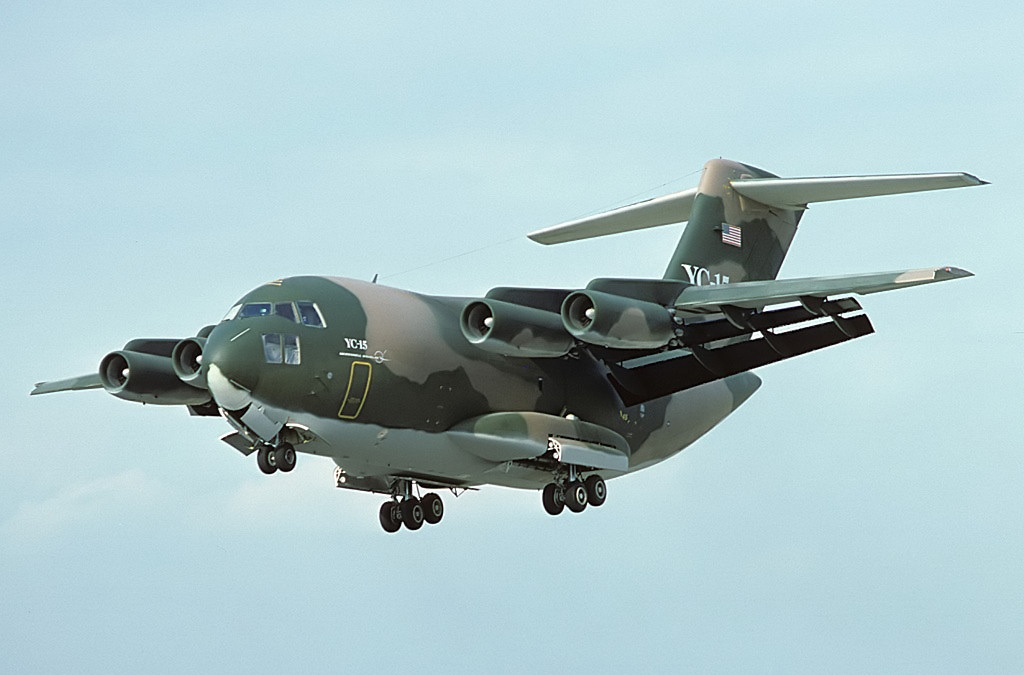
- Second YC-15 prototype in flight

General information
- Type: Tactical airlifter
- National origin: United States
- Manufacturer: McDonnell Douglas
- Status: Cancelled
- Number built: 2

History
- First flight: 26 August 1975
- Developed into: Boeing C-17 Globemaster III

The McDonnell Douglas YC-15 is a prototype four-engine short take-off and landing (STOL) tactical transport. It was McDonnell Douglas' entrant into the United States Air Force's Advanced Medium STOL Transport (AMST) competition to replace the Lockheed C-130 Hercules as the USAF's standard STOL tactical transport. In the end, neither the YC-15 nor the Boeing YC-14 was ordered into production, although the YC-15's basic design would be used to form the successful McDonnell Douglas (later Boeing) C-17 Globemaster III.

== Design and development ==
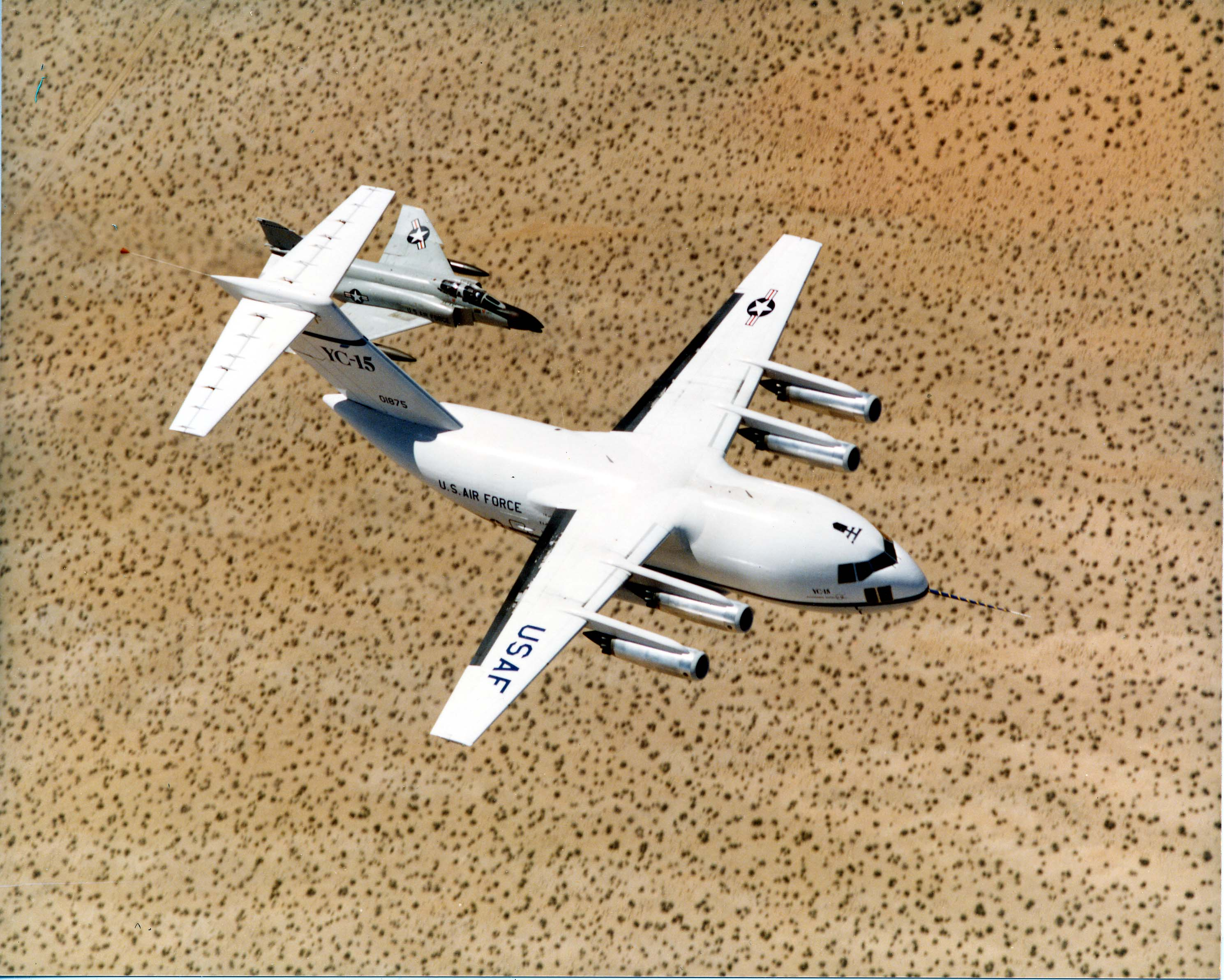
First YC-15 prototype conducting flight testing, accompanied by an F-4 Phantom II

In 1968, the USAF started work on a series of prototype proposals, which would lead to both the AMST project and the Light Weight Fighter. The official Request for proposal (RFP) was issued in January 1972, asking for operations into a 2,000-foot (610 m) semi-prepared field with a 27,000-pound (12,000 kg) payload and a 400-nautical-mile (460 mi; 740 km) mission radius. For comparison, the C-130 of that era required about 4,000 feet (1,200 m) for this load. Proposals were submitted by Bell, Boeing, Fairchild, McDonnell Douglas and the Lockheed/North American Rockwell team at this stage of the competition. On 10 November 1972, the two top bids (from Boeing and McDonnell Douglas) were selected. The companies were awarded development contracts for two prototypes each. McDonnell Douglas' prototype was designated YC-15.

McDonnell Douglas's design incorporated a supercritical wing, the result of NASA research carried out by the already famous Richard Whitcomb. This wing design dramatically lowers transonic wave drag by as much as 30% compared to more conventional profiles, while at the same time offering excellent low-speed lift. Most contemporary aircraft used swept wings to lower wave drag, but this led to poor low-speed handling, which made them unsuitable for STOL operations.

The design team also chose to use externally blown flaps to increase lift. This system uses double-slotted flaps to direct part of the jet exhaust downwards, while the rest of the exhaust passed through the flap and then followed the downward curve due to the Coandă effect. Although the effects had been studied for some time at NASA, along with similar concepts, until the introduction of the turbofan the hot and concentrated exhaust of existing engines made the system difficult to use. By the time of the AMST project, engines had changed dramatically and now provided larger volumes of less-concentrated and much cooler air. The YC-15 prototype was the first jet powered aircraft to use externally blown flaps.

For later prototypes, there were several modifications including a computer on the YC-15 was devised that would calculate the best flap angle for various flight conditions given the current gross weight. Together these modifications offered a reduction in approach speed of 10 kn.

For the YC-15, four engines were used, versions of the Pratt & Whitney JT8D-17 widely used on the Boeing 727 and Douglas DC-9. The YC-15 borrowed components from other McDonnell Douglas aircraft, with its nose gear coming from the Douglas DC-8 and the nose section and cockpit being derived from the Douglas DC-10. Parts borrowed from other aircraft included the Universal Aerial Refueling Receptacle Slipway Installation (UARRSI), taken from a Fairchild A-10, anti-tipover stabilizer struts from the Lockheed C-141 Starlifter, pumps taken from the McDonnell Douglas F-15 Eagle, Lockheed C-5 Galaxy, DC-9 and C-141 and actuators taken from the C-5 Galaxy and DC-10. In addition, the environmental cooling system was composed of components taken from the DC-9, C-141 and Boeing KC-135.

The YC-15 interior cargo hold was large, with dimensions 47 x 11.8 x 11.4 feet.

The YC-15 was the first aircraft to offer pilots a heads up display. It was especially designed to help with short field landings, showing the pilot the horizon, flight path scale, airspeed indexer and touchdown point.

== Operational history ==
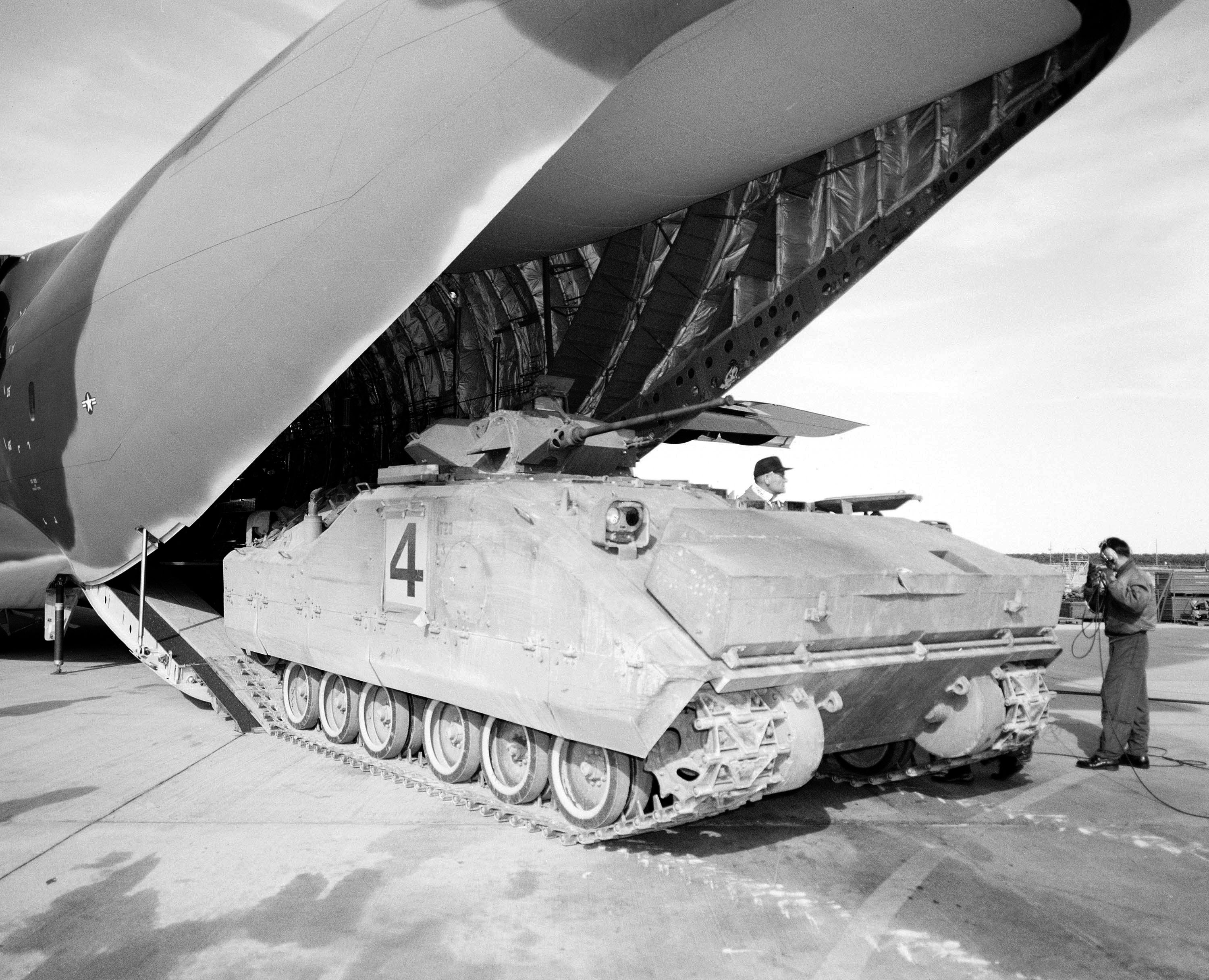
XM723 prototype being offloaded from a YC-15 during a test, 1977

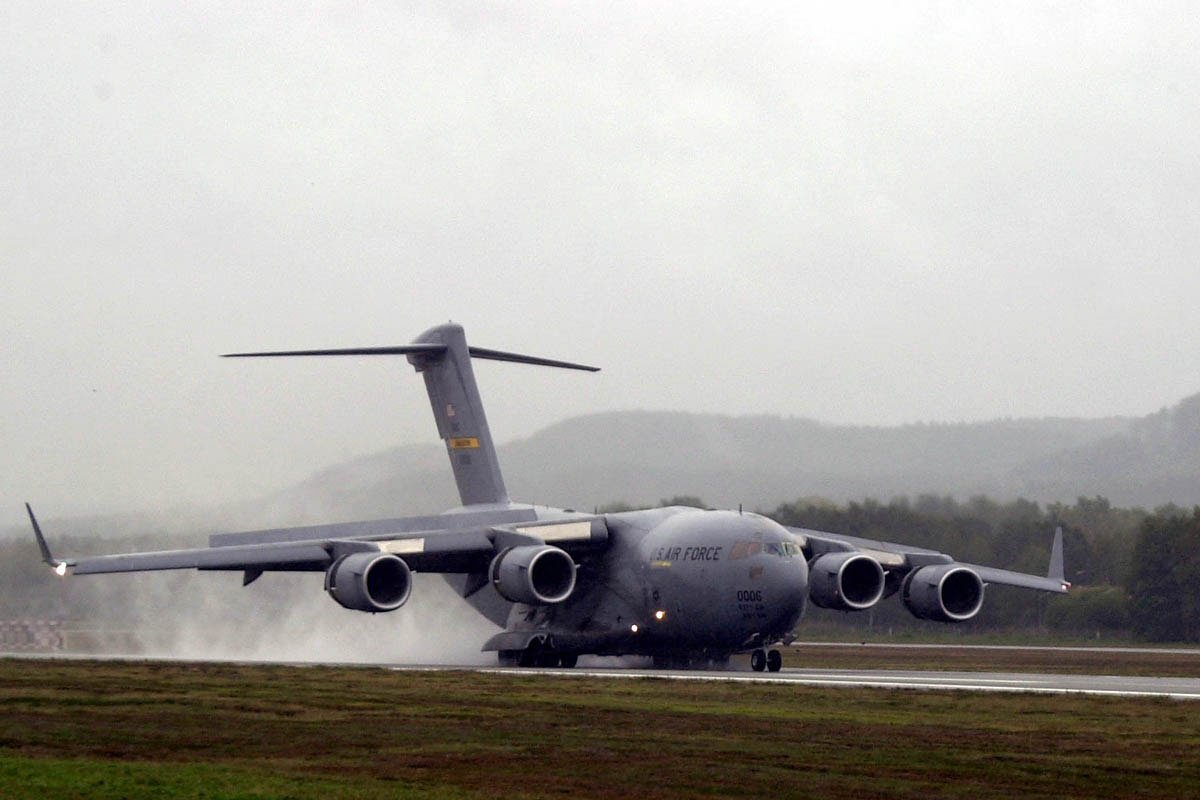
The larger C-17 Globemaster III, derived from the YC-15, shares a similar configuration, although it has swept wings.

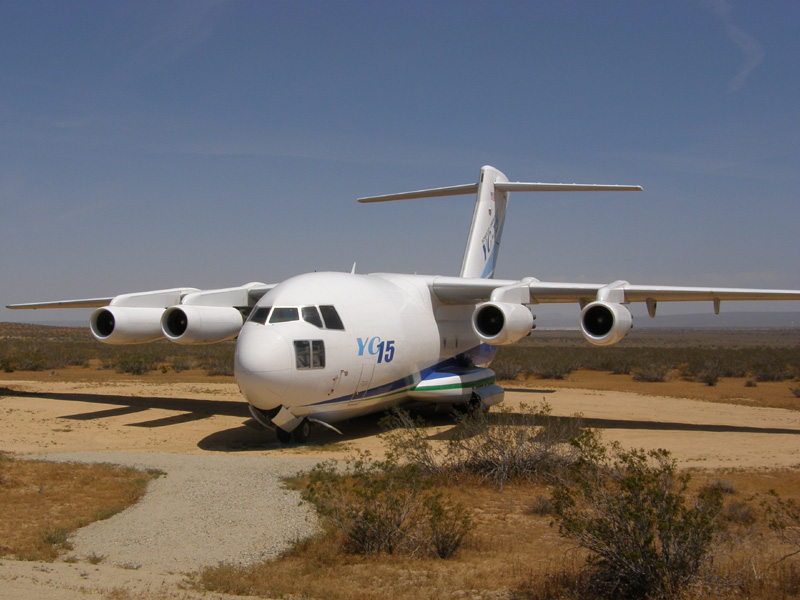
The first YC-15 in the Century Circle display at Edwards Air Force Base

Two YC-15s were built, one with a wingspan of 110 feet (34 m) (#72-1876) and one of 132 feet (40 m) (#72-1875). Both were 124 feet (38 m) long and powered by four Pratt & Whitney JT8D-17 engines, each with 15,500 pounds-force (69,000 N) of thrust.

The first flight was on 26 August 1975. The second prototype followed in December. They were tested for some time at McDonnell Douglas as the Boeing entry was not ready until almost a year later. In November 1976, both designs were transferred to Edwards Air Force Base for head-to-head testing, including lifting heavy loads like tanks and artillery from dirt airfields at Graham Ranch, off the end of Runway 22.

In Phase II of the flight test program, a "refanned" Pratt & Whitney JT8D-209 was tested in No. 1 nacelle of 72–1876, and a CFM International CFM56 was tested in the No. 1 nacelle of 72–1875. In addition, a new wing with increased chord and span was flown on 72–1875.

The YC-15 met specifications under most, but not all, conditions. It was a very good STOL plane for its size. At a gross weight of 149,300lbs, the YC-15 flew short landing approaches at only 87 kn at a 6 degree glide slope yielding a sink rate of 15.4 feet per second, compared with normal approaches that were made at about 127 kn with a typical 8-12 feet per second sink rate. For short landings, the touch down aim-point was only about 300 feet from the runway end. Pilots of the YC-15 tested both no-flare and with-flare landing techniques in STOL mode. Because of slow actuation of the thrust reversers, testing at Edwards AFB showed the plane was unable to consistently stop in “hot-and-high” conditions in the required 2000 feet.

However, the seeds of the AMST program's demise had already been sown. In March 1976, the Air Force Chief of Staff, Gen. David C. Jones, asked the Air Force Systems Command to see if it was possible to use a single model of the AMST for both strategic and tactical airlift roles, or alternatively, if it was possible to develop non-STOL derivatives of the AMST for the strategic airlift role. This led to a series of studies that basically stated that such a modification was not easy, and would require major changes to either design to produce a much larger aircraft.

The increasing importance of the strategic vs. tactical mission eventually led to the end of the AMST program in December 1979. Then, in November 1979, the C-X Task Force formed to develop the required strategic aircraft with tactical capability. The C-X program selected a proposal for an enlarged and upgraded YC-15 that was later developed into the C-17 Globemaster III. The Lockheed C-130 Hercules would be further improved into the C-130J and remains in service.

After the flight test program, the two aircraft were stored at the AMARC, located at Davis-Monthan Air Force Base. One aircraft (72-1875) was subsequently moved to the nearby Pima Air & Space Museum in 1981, but was returned to flying status by McDonnell Douglas in 1996; it was first reflown on 11 April 1997. On 16 April 1997, the aircraft was ferried to Long Beach, California to support the C-17 program. On 11 July 1998, the aircraft suffered a massive failure of the No. 1 engine during flight and made an emergency landing at Palmdale, California. On inspection, the aircraft was deemed too expensive to repair and was stored at Palmdale. In 2008, the aircraft was moved by road to Edwards AFB, where it is now on display at the Air Force Flight Test Center Museum's "Century Circle" display area, just outside the base's west gate. The other airframe (72–1876), which had remained on Celebrity Row at the AMARC for many years, was destroyed in place in April 2012.

== Specifications ==
Data from The Observer's Book of Aircraft.

General characteristics

- Crew: 3
- Capacity: Up to 150 troops or 78,000 lb (35,000 kg) of cargo
- Length: 124 ft 3 in (37.9 m)
- Wingspan: 110 ft 3 in or 132 ft 7 in (33.6 or 40.4 m)
- Height: 43 ft 4 in (13.2 m)
- Wing area: 1,740 sq ft (160 m^{2})
- Empty weight: 105,000 lb (47,600 kg)
- Max takeoff weight: 216,680 lb (98,285 kg)
- Powerplant: 4 × Pratt & Whitney JT8D-17 turbofans, 16,000 lbf (71 kN) thrust each

Performance

- Maximum speed: 590 mph (950 km/h, 510 kn)
- Cruise speed: 543 mph (872 km/h, 471 kn)
- Range: 2,995 mi (4,800 km, 2,600 nmi) with a 38,000-pound (17,000 kg) payload
- Service ceiling: 30,000 ft (9,100 m)

== See also ==
Related development

- Boeing C-17 Globemaster III

Aircraft of comparable role, configuration, and era

- Armstrong Whitworth AW.681
- Boeing YC-14
- Kawasaki C-1

Related lists

- List of STOL aircraft
