= 1997 Renan Antonov An-72 disappearance =

1997 aviation incident

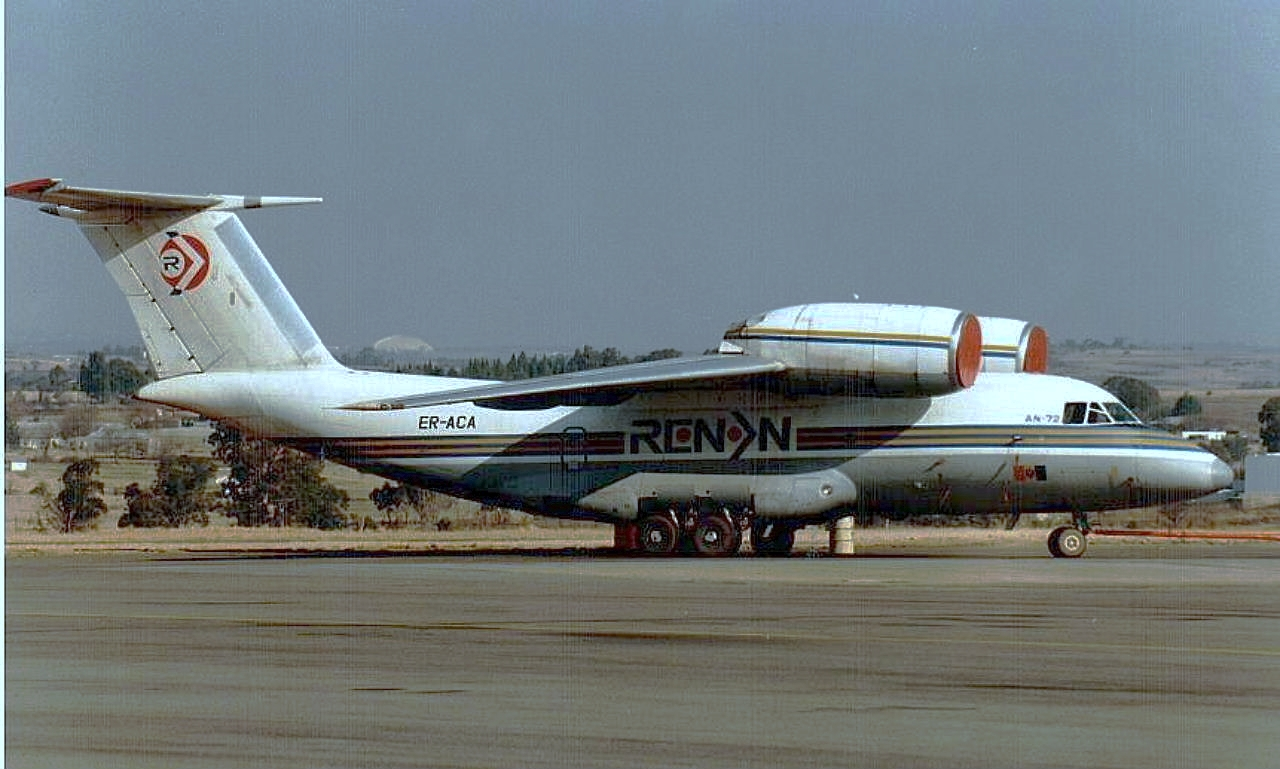
- An Antonov An-72, similar to the missing aircraft

Disappearance
- Date: 22 December 1997
- Summary: Aircraft disappearance, allegedly shot down by Angolan Air Force
- Site: Atlantic Ocean, off the coast of Angola

Aircraft
- Aircraft type: Antonov An-72
- Operator: Renan
- Registration: ER-ACF
- Flight origin: Abidjan, Ivory Coast
- Destination: Rundu, Namibia
- Occupants: 11
- Passengers: 5
- Crew: 6
- Fatalities: 11
- Survivors: 0

On 22 December 1997, an Antonov An-72 cargo aircraft of the Moldovan airline Renan, with a crew of six Moldovans and five Lebanese passengers, disappeared without a trace while on a flight from Abidjan, Ivory Coast, to Rundu, Namibia. According to some reports, the aircraft was shot down by the Angolan Air Force. All 11 people on board are presumed dead.

== Background ==
After the dissolution of the Soviet Union in the 1990s, many highly qualified specialists, including military and civilian pilots, lost their jobs. A pilot's salary in the CIS countries was $50–100 per month, while their Western counterparts earned up to $18,000. In search of income, pilots from the former USSR agreed to work in developing countries, primarily in Africa, for $1,000–3,000 per month.

Contracts were often legally illiterate; pilots could not control the cargo they carried and were forced to work "at their own risk". The complex military-political situation in countries such as Angola (where a civil war was ongoing), tropical rains that washed away runways, and corruption among local officials severely complicated the work of CIS crews. In just four months of 1999, eight aircraft with Russian crews were shot down in Angola. In total, 17 crews were killed or went missing in Angola during the 1990s.

== Aircraft ==
The missing aircraft was an Antonov An-72 (registration ER-ACF, MSN 36572094888). It was powered by two D-36 engines and belonged to the Moldovan transport and commercial aviation company Renan. In December 1997, it was operating under contract with the Congolese airline Air Pelican. According to representatives of Air Pelican, the aircraft was used to transport "consumer goods within the African continent".

== Crew and passengers ==
On board were six crew members — citizens of Moldova. The captain was Pavel Gorchinsky, a graduate of the Aktobe Higher Flight School of Civil Aviation and an international-class pilot. The other crew members were Anatoly Lemeshkin, Valery Kulagin, Mikhail Safronovich, Alexander Kolesnikov, and Pyotr Kristav. There were also five passengers on board — citizens of Lebanon. In total, there were 11 people on board.

== Disappearance ==
On 22 December 1997, the An-72 took off from Abidjan Airport in Ivory Coast at 15:25 UTC. It was bound for Rundu, Namibia, carrying some form of cargo. The estimated arrival time was 07:00 UTC the next day.

While flying along the coast of Angola, the crew contacted air traffic control. Controllers demanded that the aircraft divert inland for inspection, but the crew refused and continued on its original route.

The aircraft's owner later attempted to conceal the fact of the disappearance. For some time, the owner claimed that the aircraft had been assigned a new registration — ER-AER — which was in fact fake.

The Angolan authorities have repeatedly denied that the aircraft was ever in their country's airspace.

== Investigation and theories ==
One of the most widespread theories is that the An-72 was shot down by the Angolan Air Force over the Atlantic Ocean after refusing to comply with controllers' demands.

== Aftermath ==
The airline Renan conducted its own investigation, during which its director traveled to South Africa and Abidjan. According to his statements, French pilots flew over southern Angola and allegedly saw the An-72, but were unable to make contact with the crew due to the complex political situation. Relatives of the missing expressed doubts about the effectiveness of these efforts, believing the airline would prefer to collect insurance for the aircraft rather than spend money on a search.

Family members of the crew contacted the Ministry of Foreign Affairs of Moldova, the Ministry of Foreign Affairs of Russia, Interpol, the International Committee of the Red Cross, and even the television program Wait for Me. Interpol expressed a willingness to assist in the search, but according to Moldovan journalists, the airline rejected this offer. The Moldovan MFA, according to the captain's father, initially ignored the family's requests.

Years later, Renan provided moral and material support to the families, but the mystery of the crew's disappearance remains unsolved. As of 2021, no new information about the missing aircraft had surfaced.

== See also ==
- List of missing aircraft
