= Boeing YC-14 =

Military transport aircraft prototype by Boeing

YC-14
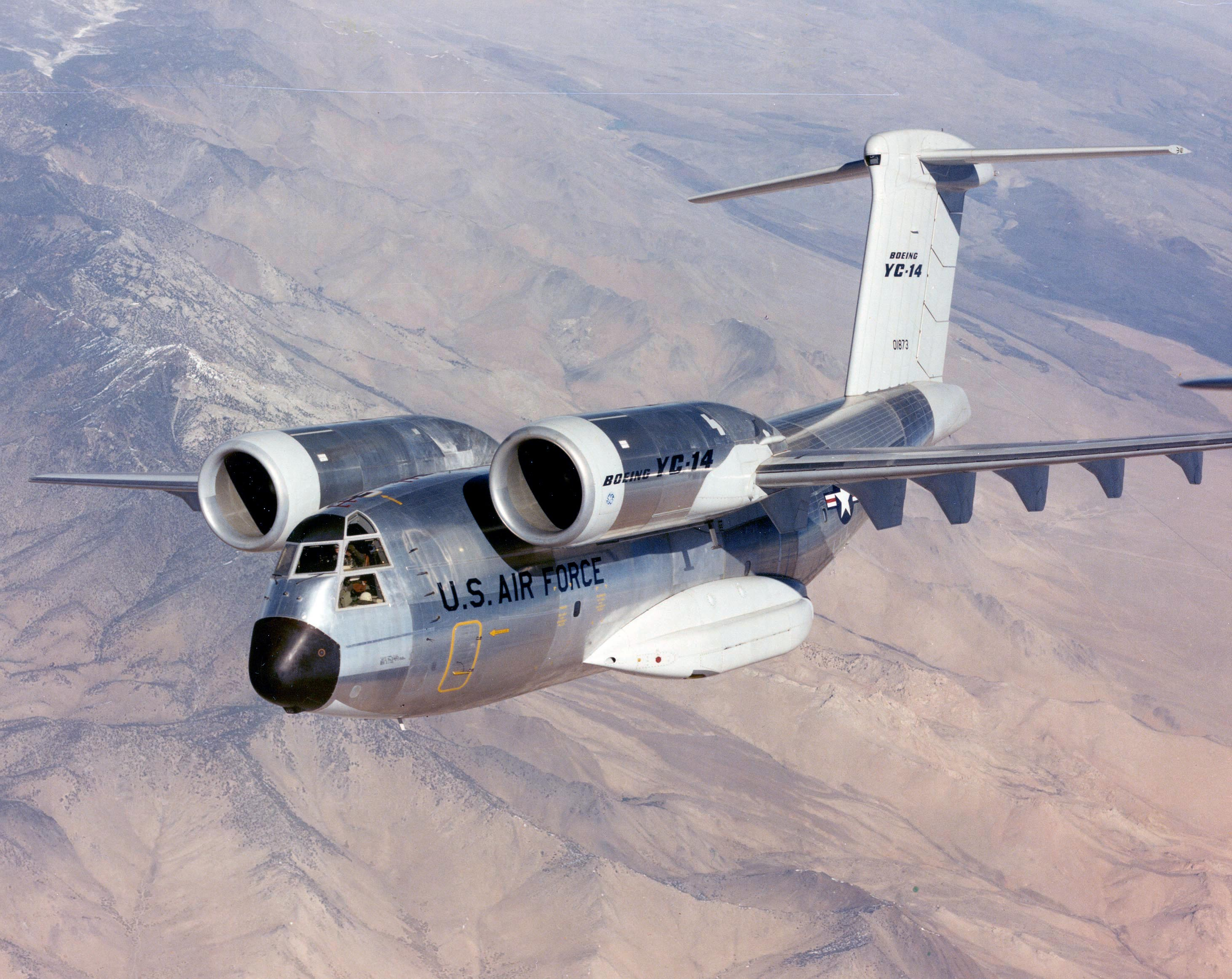
- One of the two YC-14 prototypes conducting flight testing.

General information
- Type: Tactical airlifter
- Manufacturer: Boeing
- Status: Canceled
- Primary user: United States Air Force
- Number built: 2

History
- First flight: 9 August 1976

The Boeing YC-14 is a twinjet short take-off and landing (STOL) tactical military transport aircraft. It was Boeing's entrant into the United States Air Force's Advanced Medium STOL Transport (AMST) competition, which aimed to replace the Lockheed C-130 Hercules as the USAF's standard STOL tactical transport. Although both the YC-14 and the competing McDonnell Douglas YC-15 were successful, neither aircraft entered production. The AMST project was ended in 1979 and replaced by the C-X program.

== Design and development ==
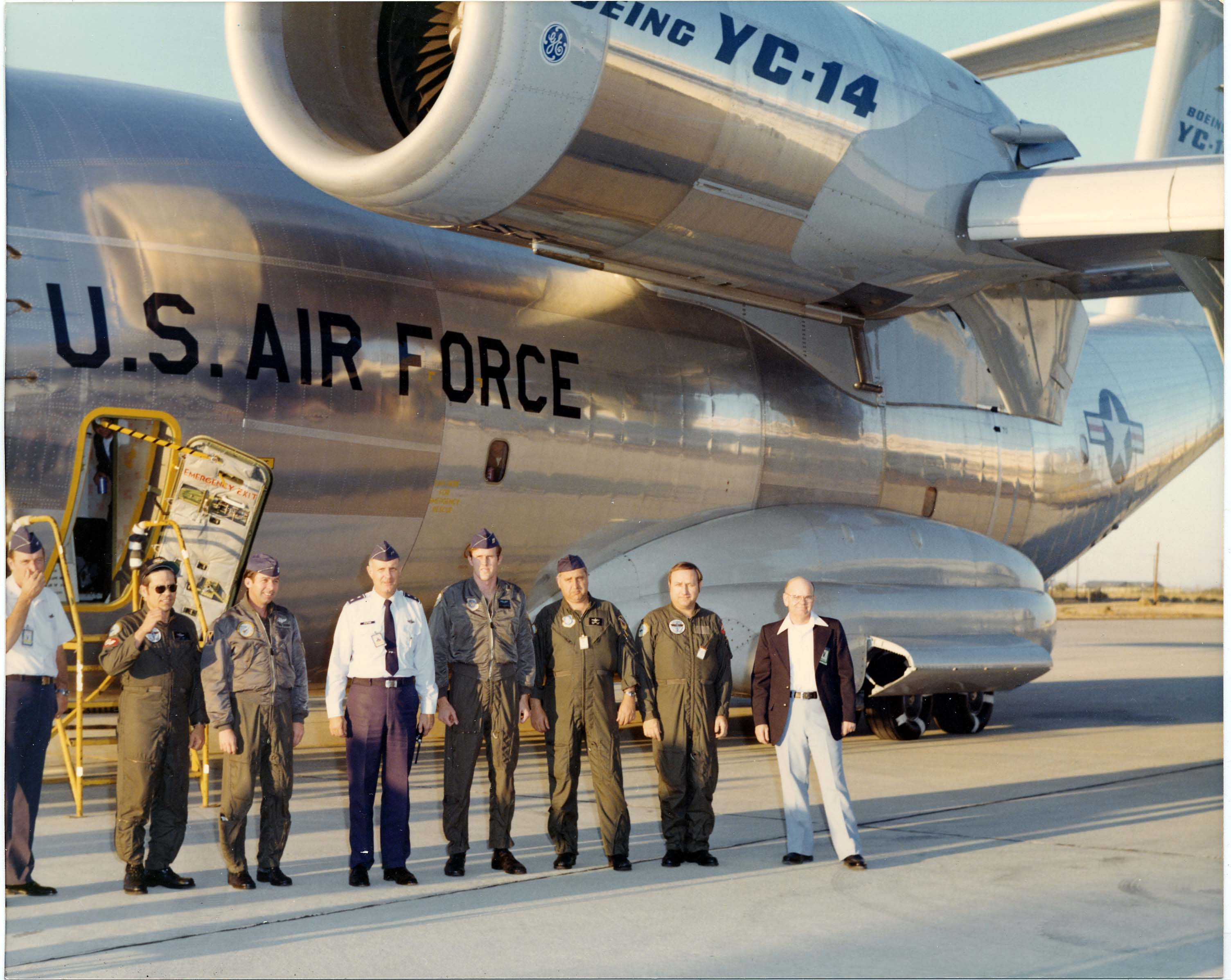
YC-14 and crew

In mid-1970, the USAF began a paper study, the Tactical Aircraft Investigation (TAI), with Boeing, McDonnell Douglas, and other companies to look at possible tactical transport aircraft designs. This study was a precursor to what became the Advanced Medium STOL Transport program. As a part of this program, Boeing began to look at various high-lift aircraft configurations. Boeing had earlier proposed an underwing externally blown flap solution for their competitor for the Lockheed C-5 Galaxy, and had put this to good use when it modified its losing entry into the Boeing 747. The company had also done studies with the original Boeing 707 prototype, the Boeing 367-80, adding extensive leading and trailing edge devices using blown flaps. For the TAI studies, Boeing again looked at those mechanisms, as well as new mechanisms like boundary layer control. However, none of these studied designs were particularly appealing to Boeing.

The Boeing engineers were aware that NASA had carried out a series of "powered lift" studies some time earlier, including both externally blown flaps, as well as upper-surface blowing (USB), an unusual variation. In the USB system, the engine is arranged over the top surface of the wing, blowing over the flaps. When the flaps are lowered, the Coandă effect makes the jet exhaust "stick" to the flaps and bend down toward the ground. They searched for additional research on the concept and found that half-span upper-surface blowing research had been conducted in the NASA Langley 12-foot (3.7 m) tunnel. An examination of the preliminary results suggested that the system was as effective as any of the other concepts previously studied. Boeing immediately started to build wind-tunnel models to verify the NASA data with layouts more closely matching their own designs. By the end of 1971, several models were being actively studied.

Another NASA project the engineers were interested in was the supercritical airfoil, designed by Richard Whitcomb. The supercritical design promised to lower transonic drag greatly, as much as a swept wing in some situations. This allowed an aircraft with such a wing to have low drag in cruise while also having a wing planform more suitable for lower-speed flight—swept wings have several undesirable characteristics at low speed. Additionally, the design has a larger leading edge radius that makes it particularly suitable for low-speed high-lift applications like a transport. Boeing incorporated the concept into their design, the first non-experimental aircraft to do so.

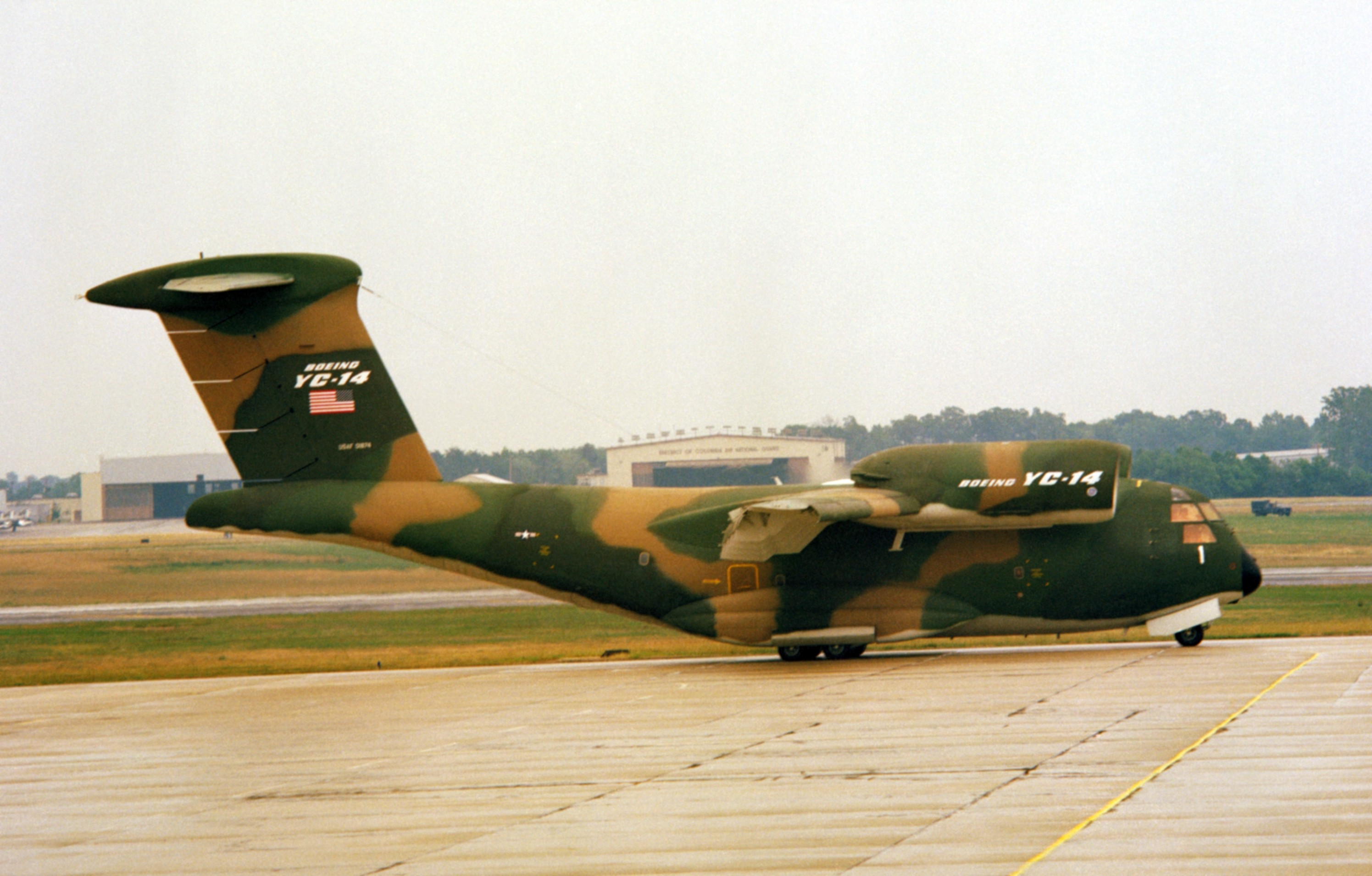
Camouflaged 72-1874 at Andrews AFB, 1976

The request for proposal (RFP) was issued in January 1972, asking for operations into a 2,000-foot (610 m) semi-prepared field at 500 nautical miles (930 km) with a 27,000 lb (12,000 kg) payload in both directions with no refueling. For comparison, the C-130 of that era required about 4,000 ft (1,200 m) for this load. Five companies submitted designs at this stage of the competition, Boeing with their Model 953 in March 1972. On 10 November 1972 the downselect was carried out, and Boeing and McDonnell Douglas won development contracts for two prototypes each.

Wind tunnel tests continued through this period. In November, John K. Wimpress again visited Langley looking for an update on NASA's own USB program. Joe Johnson and Dudley Hammond both reported on testing and showed Wimpress data that verified the high-lift performance that Boeing had quoted in its proposal. By December 1975, Boeing and NASA Langley had arranged a contract for a full-scale USB testbed, which Boeing built at their Tulalip test facility consisting of a 1/4-scale wing with one JT-15D engine and a partial fuselage. Langley was particularly interested in the effectiveness of the D-shaped nozzle that directed the jet flow over the upper surface of the wing, as well as the resulting sound levels, at that time a major focus of NASA's civilian aerodynamics research.

Two major problems were found and corrected during testing. The first was a problem with air circulating around the wing when operating at low speeds close to the ground, which had a serious effect on the spreading of the jet flow through the nozzle. This led to flow separation near the flap, and a decrease in the effectiveness of the USB system. In response, Boeing added a series of vortex generators on the upper surface of the wing, which retracted when the flap was raised above 30°. Additionally, the tail surfaces were initially placed well aft in order to maximize control effectiveness. This positioning turned out to interfere with the airflow over the wings during USB operations, and a new tail with a more vertical profile was introduced to move the elevator forward.

== Operational history ==
The first Boeing YC-14 (serial number 72-1873) flew on 9 August 1976. Two aircraft were built, the second being s/n 72-1874. The competing YC-15 had started flights almost a year earlier. Head-to-head flight testing at Edwards Air Force Base started in early November 1976. During flight testing, the YC-14 was flown at speeds as low as 59 kn (68 mph; 109 km/h) and as high as Mach 0.78 at 38,000 feet (11,600 m). It was capable of taking off and landing in a distance of 800 ft (240 m).

However, it was found that the YC-14's drag was 11% higher than originally predicted. Modifications developed in wind tunnel testing, comprising the addition of vortex generators to the upper aft portion of the nacelles, deletion of the nozzle door actuator fairing, alterations to the aft end of the landing gear pods and the addition of aft fuselage strakes, reduced this drag increment to 7%. The YC-14 also demonstrated the capability to carry the 109,200-pound (49,500 kg) M60A2 main battle tank, which was not demonstrated with the YC-15.

At the completion of testing in the late summer of 1977, the YC-14 prototypes were returned to Boeing. The prototypes were not scrapped; one is stored at the 309th Aerospace Maintenance and Regeneration Group (AMARG), located at Davis-Monthan Air Force Base and the other is on display at the nearby Pima Air & Space Museum.

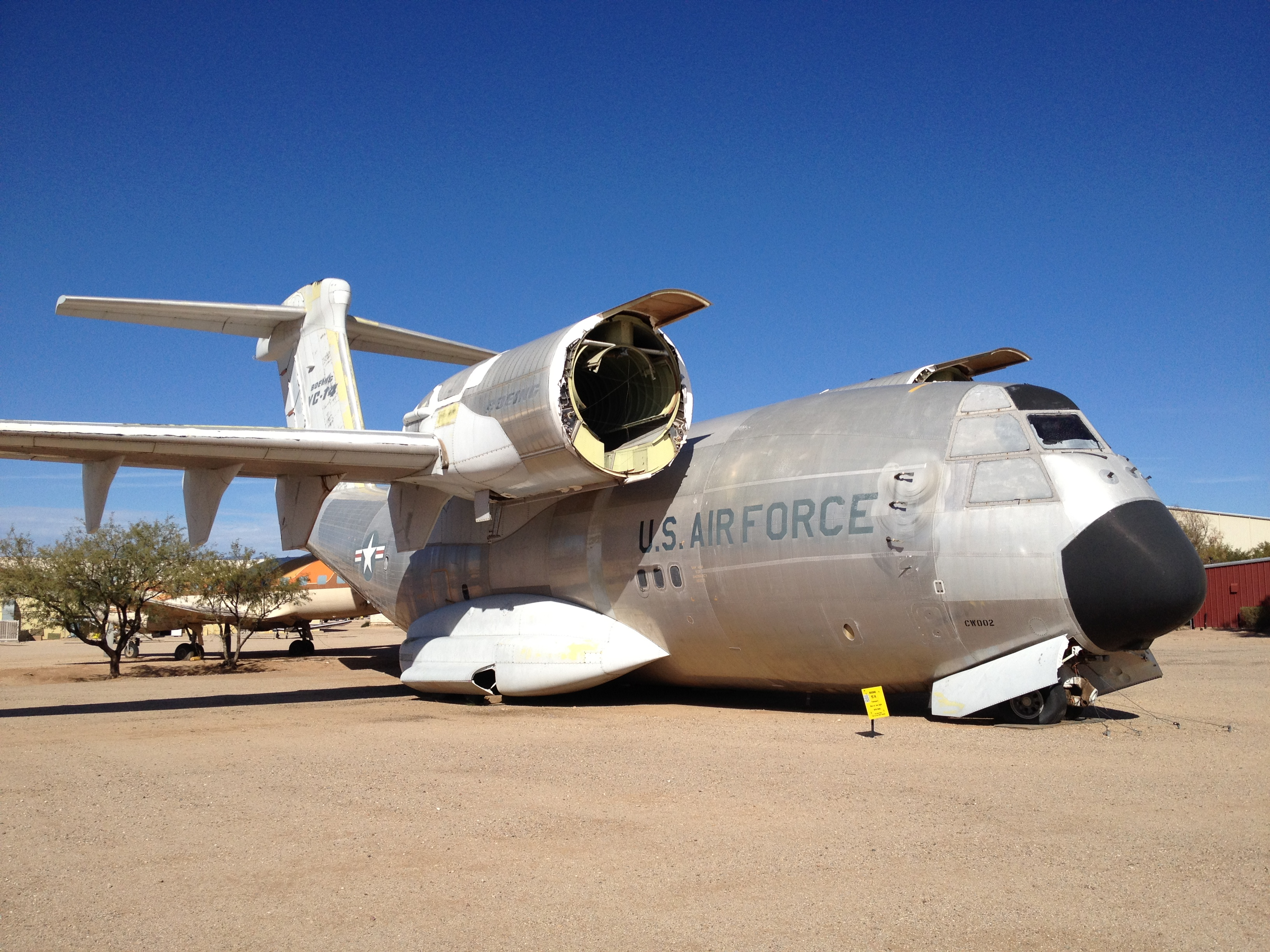
The first YC-14 on display at Pima Air Museum

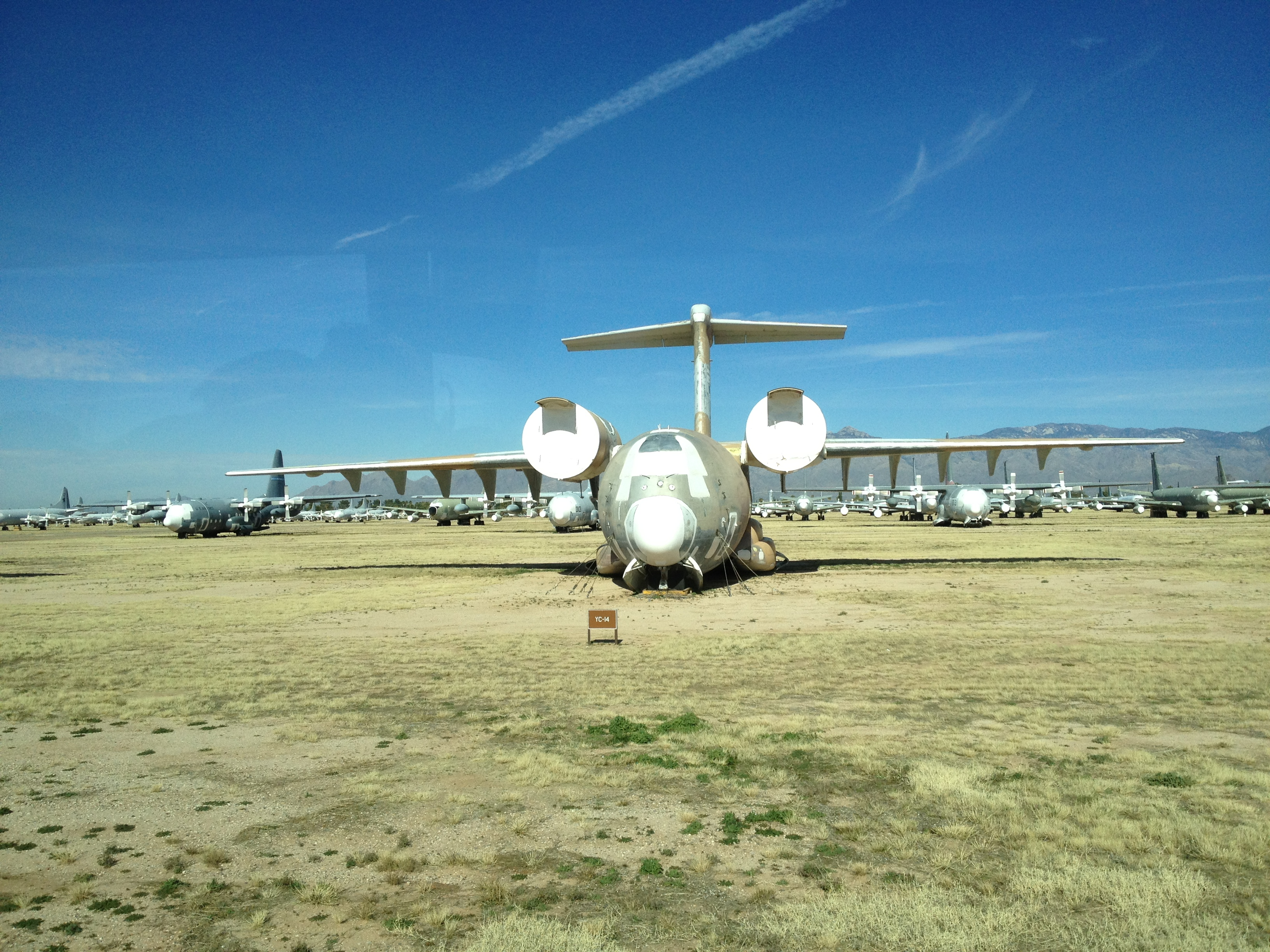
The second YC-14 stored at Davis Monthan Air Force Base

By this point, the seeds of the AMST program's demise had already been sown. In March 1976, the Air Force Chief of Staff, Gen. David C. Jones, asked the Air Force Systems Command to see if it would be possible to use a single model of the AMST for both strategic and tactical airlift roles, or alternatively, if it would be possible to develop conventional derivatives of the AMST for the strategic airlift role. This led to a series of studies that basically stated that such a modification was not easy, and would require major changes to either design to produce a much larger aircraft.

Both the YC-14 and YC-15 met or exceeded the AMST specifications under most conditions. However, the increasing importance of the strategic vs. tactical mission eventually led to the end of the AMST program in December 1979. Then, in November 1979, the C-X Task Force formed to develop the required strategic aircraft with tactical capability. The C-X program selected a proposal for an enlarged and upgraded YC-15 that was later developed into C-17 Globemaster III.

Upper surface blowing remains a fairly rare concept in use, and has been seen only on a few other aircraft, such as the Antonov An-72.

== Aircraft on display ==
- Aircraft serial number 72-1873, the first aircraft, is on display at the Pima Air & Space Museum in Tucson, Arizona.
- Aircraft serial number 72-1874, the second aircraft, is in storage at the 309th AMARG boneyard at Davis Monthan Air Force Base (32.17184°N 110.84743°W).

== Specifications ==
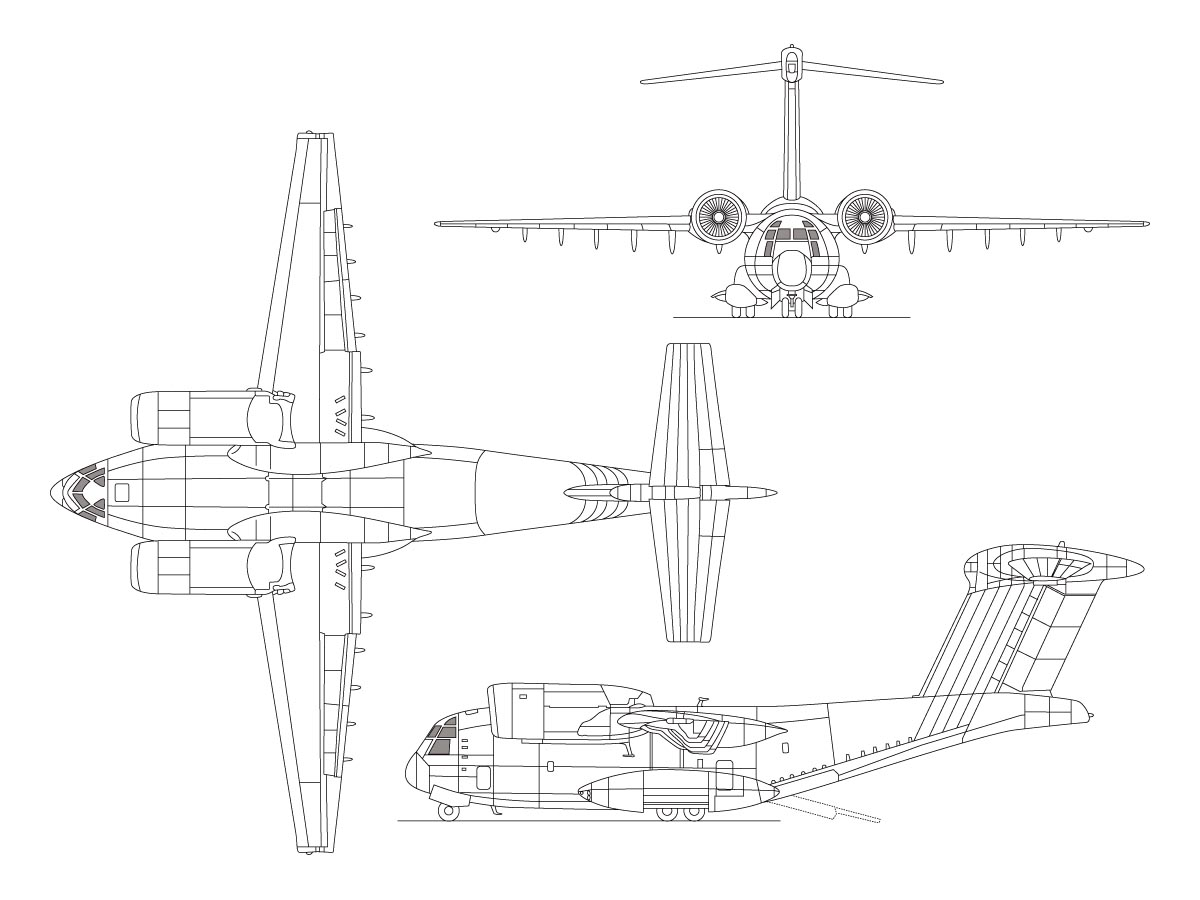
Orthographically projected diagram of the YC-14

Data from Boeing Aircraft since 1976

General characteristics

- Crew: 3
- Capacity: 150 troops or 69,000 lb (31,400 kg) (STOL: 27,000 lb (12,300 kg))
- Length: 131 ft 8 in (40.14 m)
- Wingspan: 129 ft 0 in (39.32 m)
- Height: 48 ft 4 in (14.74 m)
- Wing area: 1,762 sq ft (163.7 m^{2})
- Empty weight: 117,500 lb (53,410 kg)
- Max takeoff weight: 251,000 lb (113,850 kg) (conventional landing and takeoff), 170,000 lb (77,270 kg) (STOL)
- Powerplant: 2 × General Electric CF6-50D turbofans, 51,000 lbf (230 kN) thrust each

Performance

- Maximum speed: 504 mph (811 km/h, 438 kn)
- Cruise speed: 449 mph (723 km/h, 390 kn)
- Ferry range: 3,190 mi (5,136 km, 2,734 nmi)
- Service ceiling: 45,000 ft (13,716 m)
- Rate of climb: 6,350 ft/min (32.3 m/s)

== See also ==
Aircraft of comparable role, configuration, and era

- Antonov An-72 'Coaler'
- McDonnell Douglas YC-15

Related lists

- List of military aircraft of the United States
- List of STOL aircraft
