= Shar Ink =

Russian charter cargo airline

IATA	ICAO	Call sign
—	UGP	—
- Founded: 1992 December 22
- Ceased operations: 2019
- Hubs: Ostafyevo, Moscow
- Fleet size: 6
- Headquarters: Ostafyevo, Moscow
- Website: shar-avia.ru

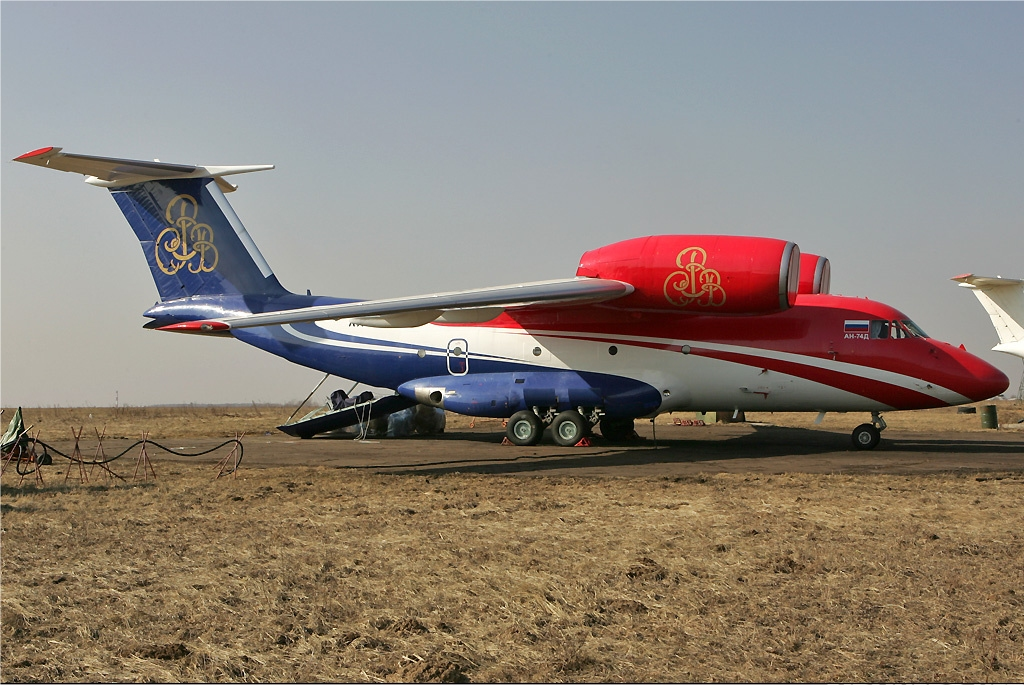
Antonov An-74

Shar Ink, (also known as Shar-Avia and Ball Inc. Ltd.), was a Russian charter cargo airline based in Moscow. In 2009, the company announced that it would be co-operating with a new airline called I-Fly. The airline ceased all operations in 2019.

== Fleet ==
Aircraft type	Active	Notes
Antonov An-74TK-100	2	RA-74005, RA-74020 active. RA-74001 derelict
Antonov An-74D	0	RA-74047 stored
Antonov An-74-200	2	RA-74015, RA-74027 active. RA-74041 moved on to Badr Airlines for African aid missions
Ilyushin IL-76	1	RA-76403. RA-76446 moved on to Continent (airline)
Agusta A-109E Power	1	RA-01901
