= Advanced Medium STOL Transport =

Military aircraft project

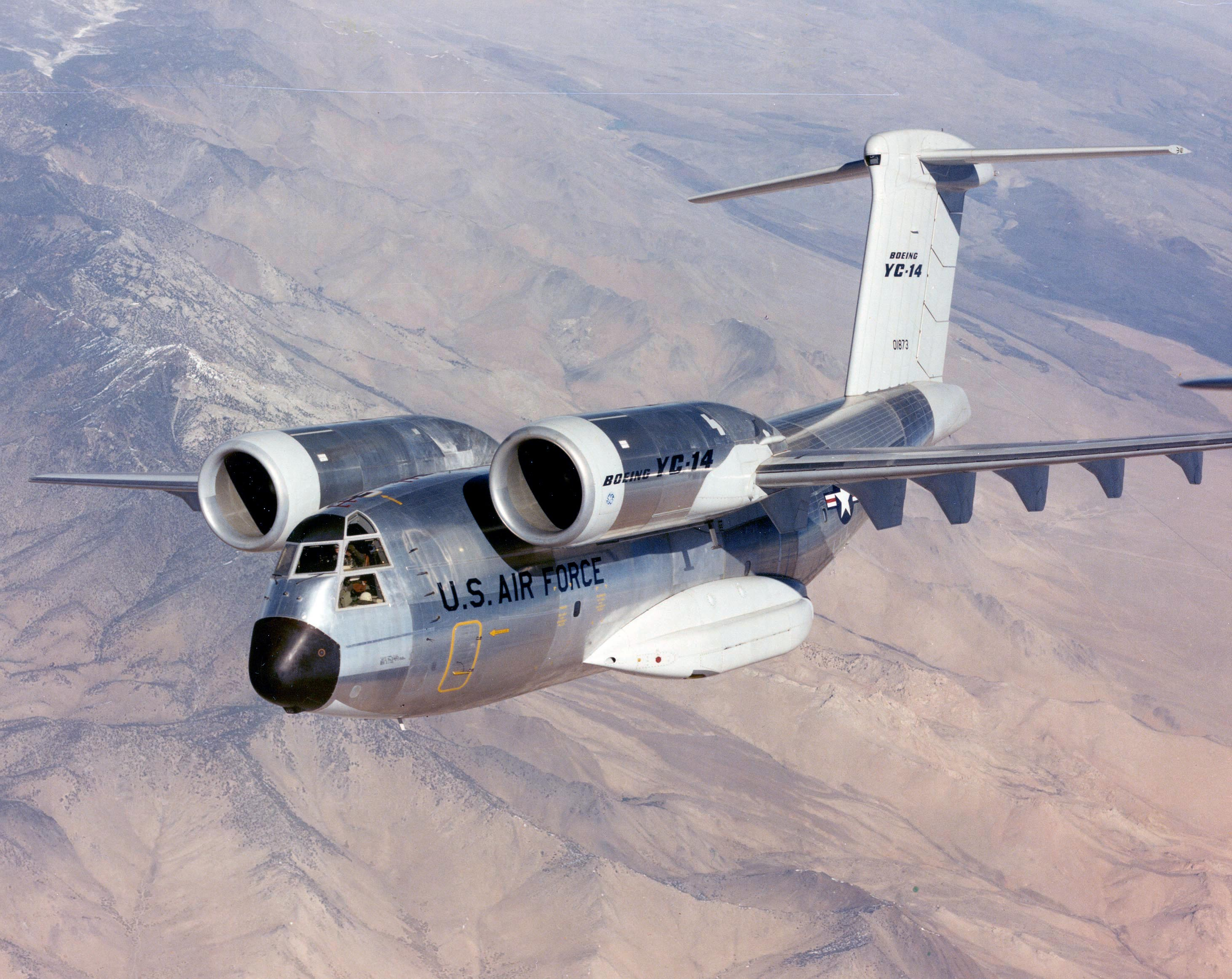
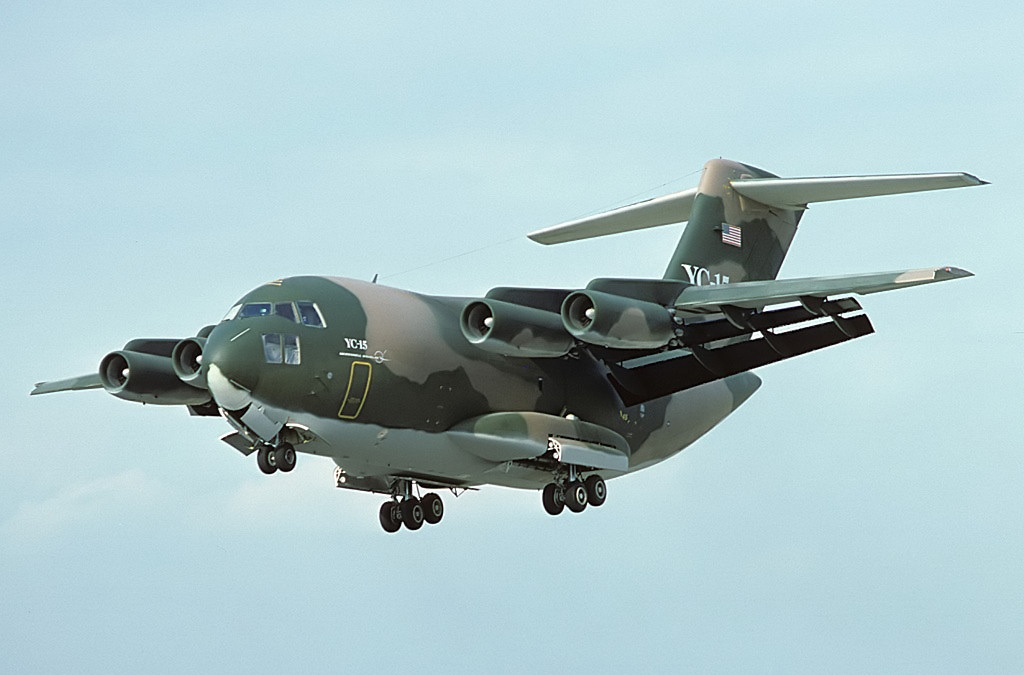
- Boeing YC-14 McDonnell Douglas YC-15

General information
- Project for: Tactical transport
- Issued by: United States Air Force
- Prototypes: Boeing YC-14; McDonnell Douglas YC-15

History
- Outcome: Canceled
- Successors: C-X program

The Advanced Medium STOL Transport (AMST) project was intended to replace the Lockheed C-130 Hercules tactical transport in United States Air Force service with a new aircraft with improved STOL performance. Increased need for strategic airlift led the Air Force to cancel the AMST program and seek a larger airlifter. Under the C-X program, the YC-15's basic design would become the successful McDonnell Douglas (later Boeing) C-17 Globemaster III.

== History ==
The Advanced Medium STOL Transport project arose from a USAF requirement released in 1968. The official RFP was issued in 1972, asking for a C-130-class aircraft with short take-off and landing capability. This included operating from a 2,000-foot (610 m) semi-prepared field with a 400-nautical-mile (740 km) radius with a 27,000-pound (12,000 kg) payload. The C-130 of that era required about 4,000-foot (1,200 m) for this load.

Five companies (Bell, Boeing, Fairchild, McDonnell Douglas and the Lockheed/North American Rockwell team) submitted designs at this stage of the competition. On 10 November 1972, the downselection was carried out, and Boeing and McDonnell Douglas won development contracts for two prototypes each. This resulted in the YC-14 and YC-15, respectively.

Both the Boeing YC-14 and McDonnell-Douglas YC-15 met the specifications of the contest under most conditions. Both types had higher drag than expected, which decreased performance. In the end, it was found more economical to just continue production of the Lockheed C-130 Hercules, which the AMST might have replaced. The C-130 continues in production to this date.

On the Boeing YC-14, the upper-surface-blowing design for high aerodynamic lift used two jet engines that blew high-velocity airstreams over the inboard section of the wing and over special trailing-edge flaps. The large multisection flaps extended rearward and downward from the wing's trailing edge to increase the wing area, thus creating extra lift, which was further augmented by positioning the engines so their jet blast across the upper wing surfaces created still more lift. In addition, the placement of the engines above the wing prevented the engines from ingesting dirt and debris and shielded some of the engine noise from the ground so that the transport could make a quieter approach.

The McDonnell Douglas YC-15 had four engines, while the Boeing version had two. The YC-15 used large double-slotted flaps that extended over 75 percent of the wingspan to enhance STOL capabilities. To save costs, it used a modified DC-8 nosewheel unit and the DC-10 cockpit, adapted for a two-person crew, with two lower windows for visibility during short-field landings.

The increasing importance of strategic vs. tactical missions eventually led to the end of the AMST program in December 1979. Then, in November 1979, the C-X Task Force formed to develop the required strategic aircraft with tactical capability. The C-X program selected a proposal for an enlarged and upgraded YC-15 and one prototype (72-1875) was reclaimed from the Pima Air & Space Museum refurbished and returned to Edwards AFB, CA for flight testing that was later incorporated into development of the C-17 Globemaster III.
