= Sweeping jet actuators =

Sweeping jet actuators are a type of active flow control technology based on fluidic oscillators used to produce sweeping jets. The first use of fluidic oscillators in the form of sweeping jets for flow control was demonstrated by Raman et al., 1999.<Cavity Resonance Suppression Using Miniature Fluidic Oscillators, G. Raman, S. Raghu and T.J. Bencic' AIAA-99-1900, 5th AIAA/CEAS Aeroacoustics Conference, Seattle, WA, May 10–12, 1999> and later by several authors working in the area of flow control. Many organizations have been working on the use of such actuators for flow control. Boeing, NASA and the University of Arizona Department of Aerospace and Mechanical Engineering, Illinois Institute of Technology, [Advanced Fluidics], Technische Universität Berlin are a few of them. They are slots built into the control surface of an airfoil that build on the same principles as that of blown flaps; that by actively blowing air over the surface of an airfoil the effective lift produced by it is increased.

== Mechanism ==
The impetus behind the research into sweeping jet actuators lies in the realization that any vertical tail structure on an aircraft is a parasitic surface in level flight. The design specification that must be met by the vertical stabilizer of any multi-engined aircraft is that it be able to produce enough lift to counteract any thrust asymmetry that would come as a result of engine failure during rotation (takeoff); but in any condition that is not an emergency or where a yaw moment is not desired the vertical stabilizer will only contribute added weight and drag to the aircraft.

The jet nozzles (located directly upstream of the hinge around which the rudder moves) eject a subsonic stream of air that flows over the rudder and act to retain or reattach the boundary layer to the control surface as it is deflected beyond the incidence angle where natural flow would separate, generating as much as a 30-percent increase in the effective lift produced by the rudder.

== History ==
As of January 2015 sweeping jet actuators have only seen experimental application and are not included as a design feature of any known aircraft.

== See also ==
- Boundary layer control
- Blown flap
- Coandă effect
- High-lift device
- Circulation control wing
- Leading edge slot
- Boundary layer suction
- Vortex generator
- Aerodynamics
- Turbulator
