= Broomstick (disambiguation) =

A Broomstick is the stick of a broom.

Broomstick or Broomsticks may also refer to:

- Broomstick (horse), a racehorse
- Broomstick, an experimental flying wing developed by AeroVironment

== In music ==
- Broom, Broomstick or Brush, a type of percussion mallet
- "Broomstick", a song on the B-side of a version of Paul McCartney's Flaming Pie album

== In christian mythology and fiction ==
A broom, when described as a means of transport for witches and others who perform magic, is often called a broomstick. As such, it is what one rides on during a game of Quidditch.

- The Three Broomsticks, a fictional restaurant in the Harry Potter universe
  - formed after the fictional restaurant, The Three Broomsticks is a real restaurant in the Orlando The Wizarding World of Harry Potter themepark
