= AeroVironment Broomstick =

Unmanned aerial vehicle (UAV)

Broomstick
- AeroVironment Broomstick. It is flying towards the left of the image.

General information
- Type: UAV
- National origin: United States
- Manufacturer: AeroVironment Inc.

History
- First flight: 1987

The AeroVironment Broomstick was an unmanned aerial vehicle developed for DARPA. It was notable for being a flying wing, with propulsion and control being achieved through the use of blown flaps and similar aerodynamic means.

== Design and development ==
The Broomstick was developed in response to a need for a long endurance aircraft with unique characteristics. It was an unswept flying wing configuration, with no dihedral and with all its propulsion and systems being contained within the wing itself. The aircraft used a 50% thick airfoil, which had been developed at the David Taylor Model Basin, located in Bethesda, Maryland. It used differential blowing for boundary layer control, propulsion, and flight control, with no propulsion elements (inlets, exhausts, propellers) being visible outside of the wing.

The Broomstick featured a fixed four wheel undercarriage. There were two vertical fins located by the trailing edge of the wing. A boom trailing behind the wing contained an angle-of-attack sensor, which worked in conjunction with an onboard autopilot.

== Operational history ==
The first flights took place in 1987, and proved the feasibility of using boundary layer control on the 50% thick airfoil. The Broomstick had horizontal and vertical tail surfaces, mounted at the end of an approximately 4 ft long tailboom. Progress was delayed till funding to allow the development of a digital autopilot became available. The Broomstick's first flight as a truly tailless aircraft, without the tailboom, was made on 14 August 1990. Broomstick flew nominally around 15-20 mph.

The Broomstick was the first known aircraft whose propulsion and control was provided entirely by boundary layer control.

== Specifications ==
Data from To Boldly Go Where No Unmanned Aircraft Has Gone Before

General characteristics

- Crew: none
- Wingspan: 25 ft (7.6 m)
- Wing area: 41.66 sq ft (3.870 m^{2})
- Aspect ratio: 15
- Gross weight: 45 lb (20 kg)

Performance

- Cruise speed: 15–20 mph (24–32 km/h, 13–17 kn)

== See also ==
- Unmanned aerial vehicle

Related lists

- List of unmanned aerial vehicles
