= High-lift device =

Wing surface area adjuster, typically for shortening take-off and landing

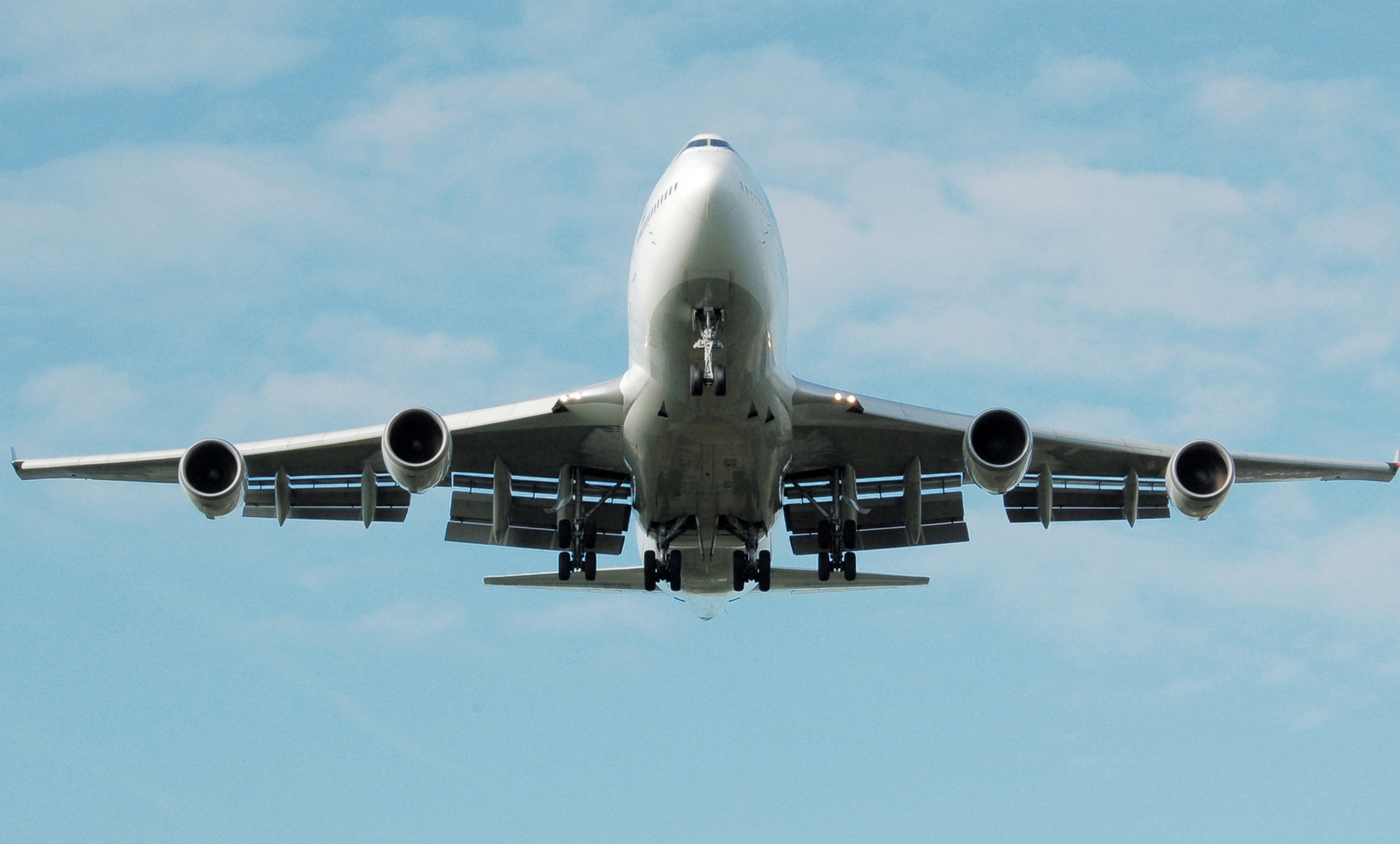
High lift devices on an Air New Zealand Boeing 747-400 (ZK-SUH) on arrival to London Heathrow, England. The triple-slotted trailing edge flaps are well displayed and the Krueger flaps on the leading edge also are visible.

In aircraft design and aerospace engineering, a high-lift device is a component or mechanism on an aircraft's wing that increases the amount of lift produced by the wing. The device may be a fixed component, or a movable mechanism which is deployed when required. Common movable high-lift devices include wing flaps and slats. Fixed devices include leading-edge slots, leading edge root extensions, and boundary layer control systems.

== Purpose ==
The size and lifting capacity of a fixed wing is chosen as a compromise between differing requirements. For example, a larger wing will provide more lift and reduce the distance and speeds required for takeoff and landing, but will increase drag, which reduces performance during the cruising portion of flight. Modern passenger jet wing designs are optimized for speed and efficiency during the cruise portion of flight, since this is where the aircraft spends the vast majority of its flight time. High-lift devices compensate for this design trade-off by adding lift at takeoff and landing, reducing the speed and distance required to safely land the aircraft, and allowing the use of a more efficient wing in flight. The high-lift devices on the Boeing 747-400, for example, increase the wing area by 21% and increase the lift generated by 90%.

== Types of device ==
=== Flaps ===
The most common high-lift device is the flap, a movable portion of the wing that can be lowered to produce extra lift. When a flap is lowered this re-shapes the wing section to give it more camber. Flaps are usually located on the trailing edge of a wing, while leading edge flaps are used occasionally. There are many kinds of trailing-edge flap.

Simple hinged flaps came into common use in the 1930s, along with the arrival of the modern fast monoplane which had higher landing and takeoff speeds than the old biplanes.

In the split flap, the lower surface hinges downwards while the upper surface remains either fixed to the wing or moves independently.

Travelling flaps also extend backwards, to increase the wing chord when deployed, increasing the wing area to help produce yet more lift. These began to appear just before World War II due to the efforts of many different individuals and organizations in the 1920s and 30s.

Slotted flaps comprise several separate small airfoils which separate apart, hinge and even slide past each other when deployed. Such complex flap arrangements are found on many modern aircraft. Large modern airliners make use of triple-slotted flaps to produce the massive lift required during takeoff.

=== Slats and slots ===
Another common high-lift device is the slat, a small aerofoil shaped device attached just in front of the wing leading edge. The slat re-directs the airflow at the front of the wing, allowing it to flow more smoothly over the upper surface when at a high angle of attack. This allows the wing to be operated effectively at the higher angles required to produce more lift. A slot is the gap between the slat and the wing. The slat may be fixed in position, with a slot permanently in place behind it, or it may be retractable so that the slot is closed when not required. If it is fixed, then it may appear as a normal part of the leading edge of a wing, with the slot buried in the wing surface immediately behind it.

A slat or slot may be either full-span, or may be placed on only part of the wing (usually outboard), depending on how the lift characteristics need to be modified for good low speed control. Slots and slats are sometimes used just for the section in front of the ailerons, ensuring that when the rest of the wing stalls, the ailerons remain usable.

The first slats were developed by Gustav Lachmann in 1918 and simultaneously by Handley-Page who received a patent in 1919. By the 1930s automatic slats had been developed, which opened or closed as needed according to the flight conditions. Typically they were operated by airflow pressure against the slat to close it, and small springs to open it at slower speeds when the dynamic pressure reduced, for example when the speed fell or the airflow reached a predetermined angle-of-attack on the wing.

Modern systems, like modern flaps, can be more complex and are typically deployed hydraulically or with servos.

=== Boundary layer control and blown flaps ===
Powered high-lift systems generally use airflow from the engine to shape the flow of air over the wing, replacing or modifying the action of the flaps. Blown flaps take "bleed air" from the jet engine's compressor or engine exhaust and blow it over the rear upper surface of the wing and flap, re-energising the boundary layer and allowing the airflow to remain attached at higher angles of attack. A more advanced version of the blown flap is the circulation control wing, a mechanism that ejects air backwards over a specially designed airfoil to create lift through the Coandă effect. The Blackburn Buccaneer had a sophisticated boundary layer control (BLC) system which involved compressor air blown onto the wings and tailplane to reduce the stalling speed and facilitate operations from smaller aircraft carriers.

Another approach is to use the airflow from the engines directly, by placing a flap so that it deploys into the path of the exhaust. Such flaps require greater strength due to the power of modern engines and also greater heat resistance to the hot exhaust, but the effect on lift can be significant. Examples include the C-17 Globemaster III.

=== Leading edge root extensions ===
More common on modern fighter aircraft but also seen on some civil types, is the leading-edge root extension (LERX), sometimes called just a leading edge extension (LEX). A LERX typically consist of a small triangular fillet attached to the wing leading edge root and to the fuselage. In normal flight the LERX generates little lift. At higher angles of attack, however, it generates a vortex that is positioned to lie on the upper surface of the main wing. The swirling action of the vortex increases the speed of airflow over the wing, so reducing the pressure and providing greater lift. LERX systems are notable for the potentially large angles in which they are effective.

=== Co-Flow Jet ===
A Co-Flow Jet (CFJ) wing has an upper surface with an injection slot after the leading edge and a suction slot before the trailing edge, to augment lift, increase the stall margin and reduce drag. CFJ is promoted by the mechanical and aerospace engineering department of the University of Miami. For a hybrid-electric regional aircraft based on the ATR 72 with the same wing area, size and weight, CFJ improves its cruise lift coefficient for a higher wing loading, allowing more fuel and batteries for longer range.

== See also ==
- Index of aviation articles
- Boundary layer control
- Circulation control wing
- Chine (aircraft)
