= Boundary layer suction =

Boundary layer suction is a boundary layer control technique in which an air pump is used to extract the boundary layer at the wing or the inlet of an aircraft. Improving the air flow can reduce drag. Improvements in fuel efficiency have been estimated as high as 30%.

== Boundary layer ==
The air molecules at the surface of a wing are effectively stationary (see the no-slip condition). If the flow is smooth, known as laminar flow, the velocity of the air increases steadily as measurements are taken further away from the surface. However the smooth flow is often disturbed by the boundary layer breaking away from the surface and creating a low pressure region immediately behind the airfoil (see flow separation). This low pressure region results in increased overall drag. Attempts have been made over the years to delay the onset of this flow separation by careful design and smooth surfaces.

== Use of suction ==
As flow separation results from the velocity deficit that is characteristic of boundary layers, suction attempts to remove the boundary layer from the surface before it can separate. The technology was first developed by Werner Pfenninger in the Second World War and has been researched almost continuously since. In the 1960s, NASA experimented with this concept with the Northrop X-21, a converted Douglas WB-66D. In the 1990s, tests were done by NASA with an F-16XL research aircraft.

Research is going on for its use in gliders at the Technical University of Delft. However, about 500 watts of power would be needed to drive the pumps which would mean covering the glider with solar panels and would increase the cost greatly.

== See also ==
- The pusher configuration is an alternative way to re-energize the boundary layer, but is only used on the fuselage.
- Vortex generator
- Aerodynamics
- Circulation control wing
- Turbulator
