= Boundary layer control =

Fluid dynamics control in engineering

In engineering, boundary layer control refers to methods of controlling the behaviour of fluid flow boundary layers.

It may be desirable to reduce flow separation on fast vehicles to reduce the size of the wake (streamlining), which may reduce drag. Boundary layer separation is generally undesirable in aircraft high lift coefficient systems and jet engine intakes.

Laminar flow produces less skin friction than turbulent but a turbulent boundary layer transfers heat better. Turbulent boundary layers are more resistant to separation.

The energy in a boundary layer may need to be increased to keep it attached to its surface. Fresh air can be introduced through slots or mixed in from above. The low momentum layer at the surface can be sucked away through a perforated surface or bled away when it is in a high pressure duct. It can be scooped off completely by a diverter or internal bleed ducting. Its energy can be increased above that of the free stream by introducing high velocity air.

== Nature ==
British zoologist Sir James Gray stated that dolphins appeared to have a turbulent boundary layer to reduce the likelihood of separation and minimize drag, and that mechanisms for maintaining a laminar boundary layer to reduce skin friction have not been demonstrated for dolphins. This became known as Gray's Paradox.

The wings of birds have a leading edge feature called the Alula which delays wing stalling at low speeds in a similar manner to the leading edge slat on an aircraft wing.

Thin membrane wings found on bats and insects have features which appear to cause favourable roughening at the Reynolds numbers involved, thereby enabling these creatures to fly better than would otherwise be the case.

== Sports ==
Balls may be given features which roughen the surface and extend the hit or throw distance. Roughening causes the boundary layer to become turbulent and remain attached farther round the back before breaking away with a smaller wake than would otherwise be the case. Balls may be struck in different ways to give them spin which makes them follow a curved path. The spin causes boundary layer separation to be biased to one side which produces a side force.

BL control (roughening) was applied to golf balls in the 19th century. The stitching on cricket balls and baseballs acts as a boundary layer control structure.

== On a cylinder ==
In the case of a freestream flow past a cylinder, three methods may be employed to control the boundary layer separation that occurs due to the adverse pressure gradient. Rotation of the cylinder can reduce or eliminate the boundary layer that is formed on the side which is moving in the same direction as the freestream. The side moving against the flow also exhibits only partial separation of the boundary layer. Suction applied through a slit in the cylinder near a separation point can also delay the onset of separation by removing fluid particles that have been slowed in the boundary layer. Alternatively, fluid can be blown from a faired slit such that the slowed fluid is accelerated and thus the point of separation is delayed.

== Maintaining a laminar boundary layer on aircraft ==
Laminar flow airfoils were developed in the 1930s by shaping to maintain a favourable pressure gradient to prevent them becoming turbulent. Their low-drag wind tunnel results led to them being used on aircraft such as the P-51 and B-24 but maintaining laminar flow required low levels of surface roughness and waviness not routinely found in service. Krag states that tests on the P-51 airfoil done in the high speed DVL wind tunnel in Berlin showed the laminar flow effect completely disappeared at real flight Reynolds numbers. Implementing laminar flow in high-Reynolds-number applications generally requires very smooth, wave-free surfaces, which can be difficult to produce and maintain.

Maintaining laminar flow by controlling the pressure distribution on an airfoil is called Natural laminar flow (NLF) and has been achieved by sailplane designers with great success.

On swept wings a favorable pressure gradient becomes destabilizing due to cross flow and suction is necessary to control cross flow. Supplementing the effect of airfoil shaping with boundary layer suction is known as laminar flow control (LFC)

The particular control method required for laminar control depends on Reynolds-number and wing leading edge sweep. Hybrid laminar flow control (HLFC) refers to swept wing technology in which LFC is applied only to the leading edge region of a swept wing and NLF aft of that. NASA-sponsored activities include NLF on engine nacelles and HLFC on wing upper surfaces and tail horizontal and vertical surfaces.

== Aircraft design ==
In aeronautical engineering, boundary layer control may be used to reduce parasitic drag and increase usable angle of attack. Fuselage-mounted engine intakes are sometimes equipped with a splitter plate.

Much research was conducted to study the lift performance enhancement due to suction for aerofoils in the 1920s and 1930s at the Aerodynamische Versuchsanstalt in Göttingen.

An example of an aircraft with active boundary layer control is the Japanese sea plane ShinMaywa US-1. This large, four-engined aircraft was used for anti-submarine warfare (ASW) and search and rescue (SAR). It was capable of STOL operation and very low air speeds. Its replacement in the SAR role, the ShinMaywa US-2, uses a similar system for its capability to fly at 50 knots. This feature is also used in Boeing's 787-9 Dreamliner aircraft.

== See also ==
- Blown flap
- Coandă effect
- High-lift device
- Circulation control wing
- Leading edge slot
- Boundary layer suction
- Vortex generator
- Aerodynamics
- Turbulator
