= Turbulator =

Device on an aircraft surface to induce turbulence

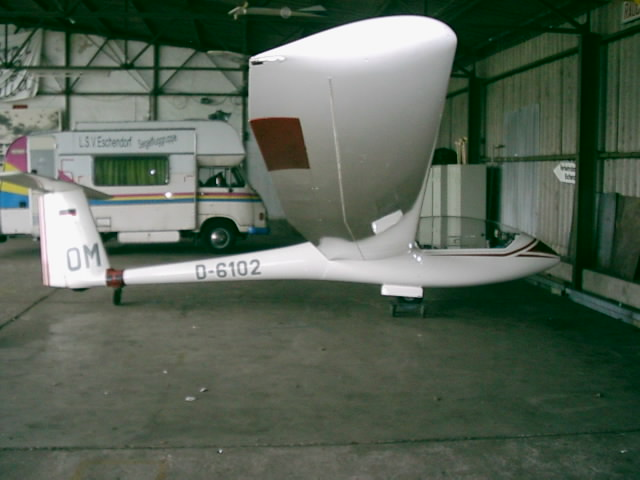
Grob G 102 Astir prototype with turbulator tape under the wing

A turbulator is a device that turns a laminar boundary layer into a turbulent boundary layer.

== Device ==
Turbulent flow can be desired on parts of the surface of an aircraft wing (airfoil) or in industrial applications such as heat exchangers and the mixing of fluids. The term “turbulator” is applied to a variety of applications and is used as a derivative of the word turbulent. However, the word has no commonly accepted technical or scientific meaning. It has been approved as a trademark in the U.S. and other countries in conjunction with machine parts used within rotating drums, sterilizers, heat transfer ovens, mixing and pelletizing machines, and air destratification fans for horticultural and agricultural uses, among others.

In gliders the turbulator is often a thin zig-zag strip that is placed on the lower side of the wing and sometimes on the vertical stabilizer.

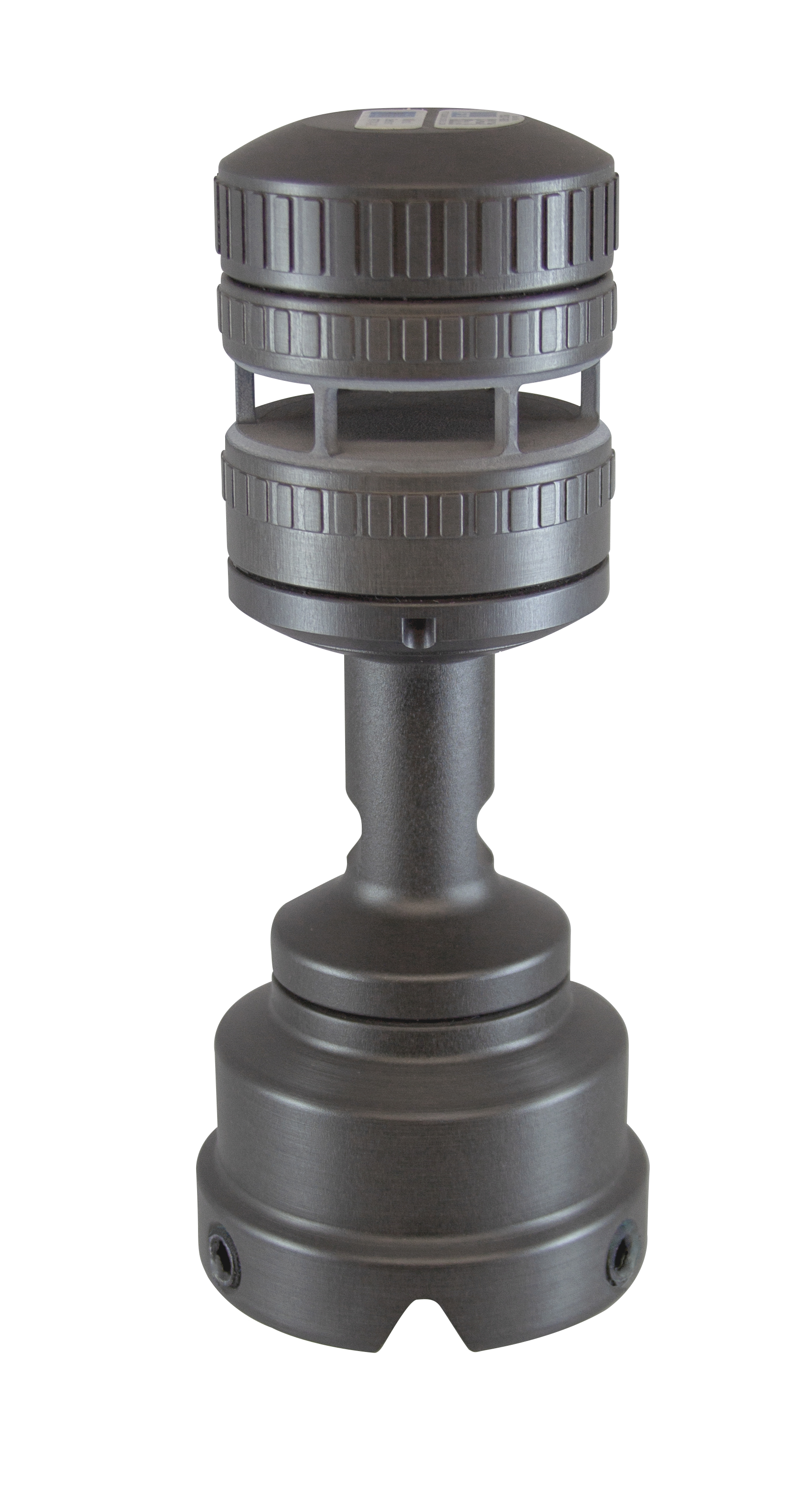
FT742-DM50 ultrasonic wind sensor using turbulators to condition the airflow

In wind sensors (anemometers), the use of turbulators reduces inaccuracies in the measurement of wind speed caused by the unpredictable switching between laminar flow and turbulent flow. Therefore the calibration of the wind sensor can be accomplished more accurately. Since wind direction can be calculated from a number of wind speed measurements, the measurement of the wind direction is also improved.

== See also ==
- Aerodynamics
- Boundary layer control
- Circulation control wing
- Vortex generator
