= Coandă effect =

Tendency of a fluid jet to stay attached to a surface of any form

The Coandă effect (/ˈkwɑːndə/ or /ˈkwæ-/) is the tendency of a fluid jet to stay attached to a surface of any form. Merriam-Webster describes it as "the tendency of a jet of fluid emerging from an orifice to follow an adjacent flat or curved surface and to entrain fluid from the surroundings so that a region of lower pressure develops."

It is named after Romanian inventor Henri Coandă, who was the first to recognize the practical application of the phenomenon in aircraft design around 1910. (Note: "The Coanda effect is a phenomenon that was first observed in 1910 by a mathematician and engineer named Henri Coandă. He discovered that when air was ejected from a rectangular nozzle, it would attach itself to an inclined flat plate connected to the nozzle exit. Emphasizing the need for a sharp angle between the nozzle and the flat plate, Coandă then applied the principle to a series of deflecting surfaces, each at a sharp angle to the previous one, and succeeded in turning flows through angles as large as 180. He stated that "when a jet of fluid is passed over a curved surface, it bends to follow the surface, entraining large amounts of air as it does so," and this phenomenon has become known as the Coandă Effect.(Lubert 2011, pp. 144–153)) It was first documented explicitly in two patents issued in 1936.

== History ==
A description of this phenomenon was provided by Thomas Young in a lecture to The Royal Society in 1800:

The lateral pressure which urges the flame of a candle towards the stream of air from a blowpipe is probably exactly similar to that pressure which eases the inflection of a current of air near an obstacle. Mark the dimple which a slender stream of air makes on the surface of water. Bring a convex body into contact with the side of the stream and the place of the dimple will immediately show the current is deflected towards the body; and if the body be at liberty to move in every direction it will be urged towards the current... (Note: The pressure of the air jet is actually supplementing the pressure of the atmosphere which makes water or other liquids lay smooth. Blow on a part of the water and the pressure is increased a slight amount which naturally makes the water move away. Direct a flame parallel over a liquid or submerge a candle almost to its wick and the liquid will be seen to rise slightly as the heat of the flame lessens the atmospheric pressure pressing on the water. The hotter the flame and the closer to the surface the greater the effect will be seen.(Young 1800))

More than a hundred years later, Henri Coandă identified an application of the effect during experiments with his Coandă-1910 aircraft, which mounted an unusual engine he designed. The motor-driven turbine pushed hot air rearward, and Coandă noticed that the airflow was attracted to nearby surfaces. In 1934, Coandă obtained a patent in France for a "method and apparatus for deviation of a fluid into another fluid". The effect was described as the "deviation of a plain jet of a fluid that penetrates another fluid in the vicinity of a convex wall". The first official documents that explicitly mention the effect were his two 1936 patents. This name was accepted by aerodynamicist Theodore von Kármán, who had a long scientific relationship with Coandă on aerodynamics problems.

== Mechanism ==
Diagrams illustrating mechanism responsible for the Coandă effect
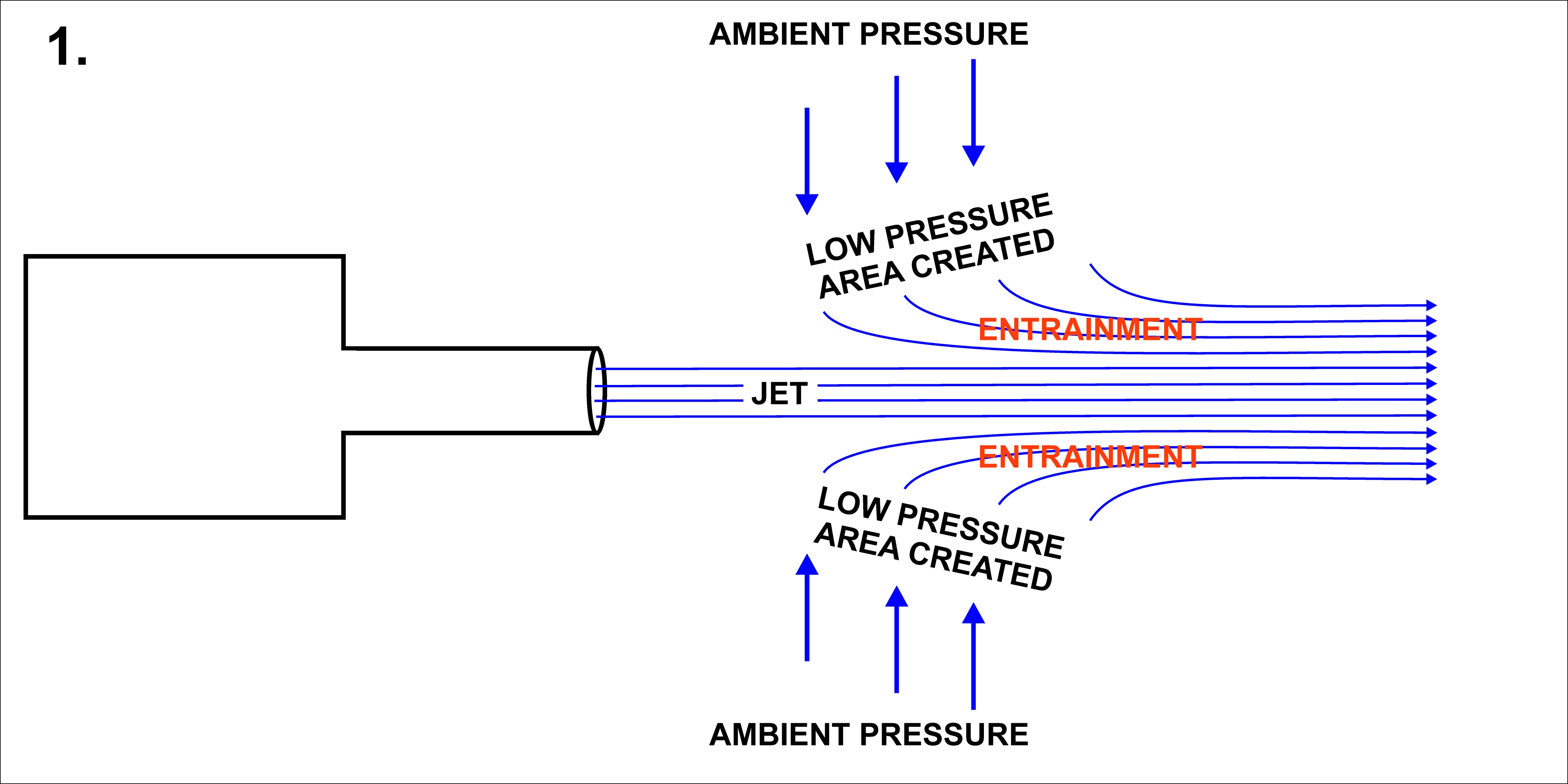
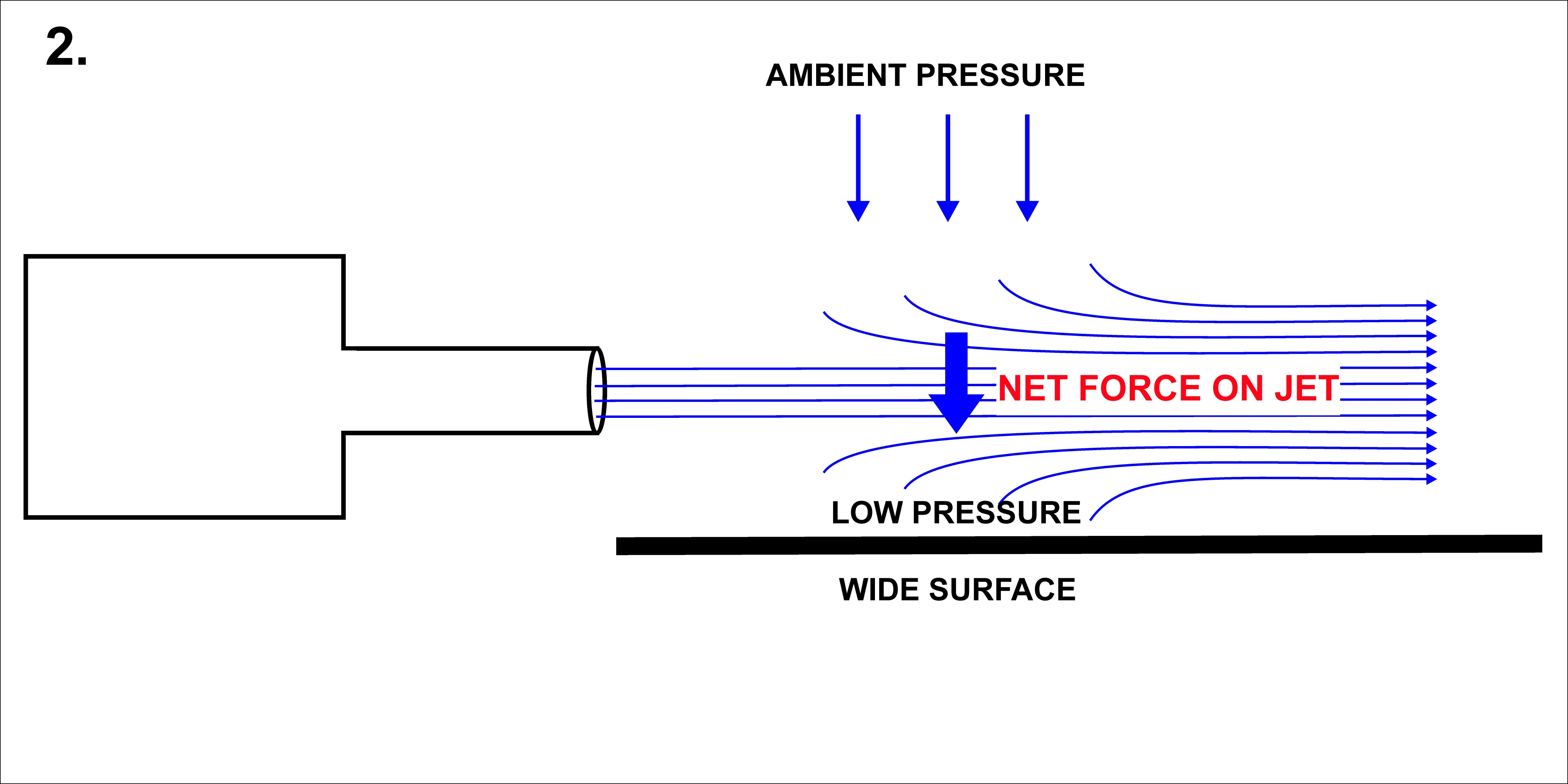
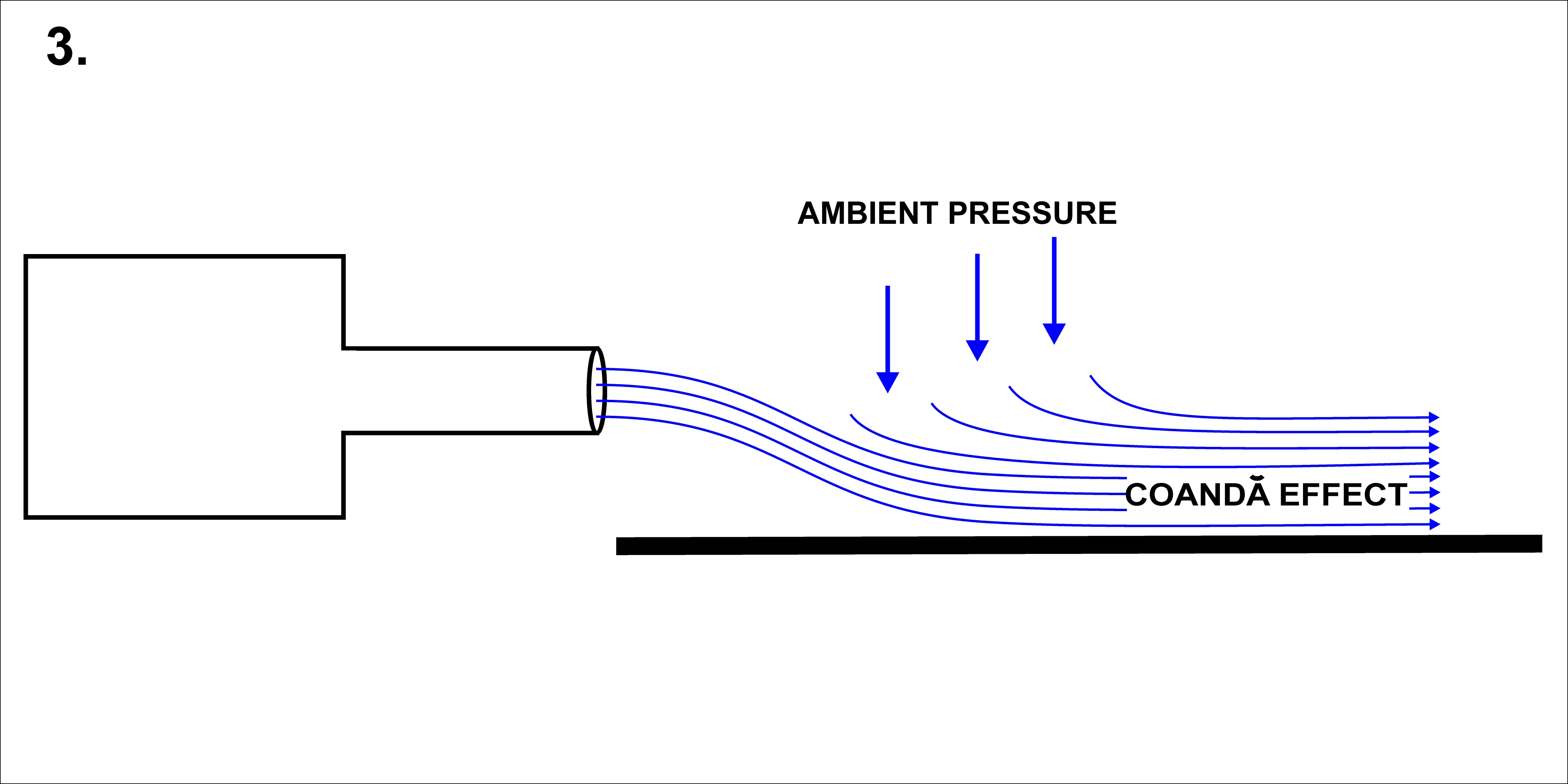
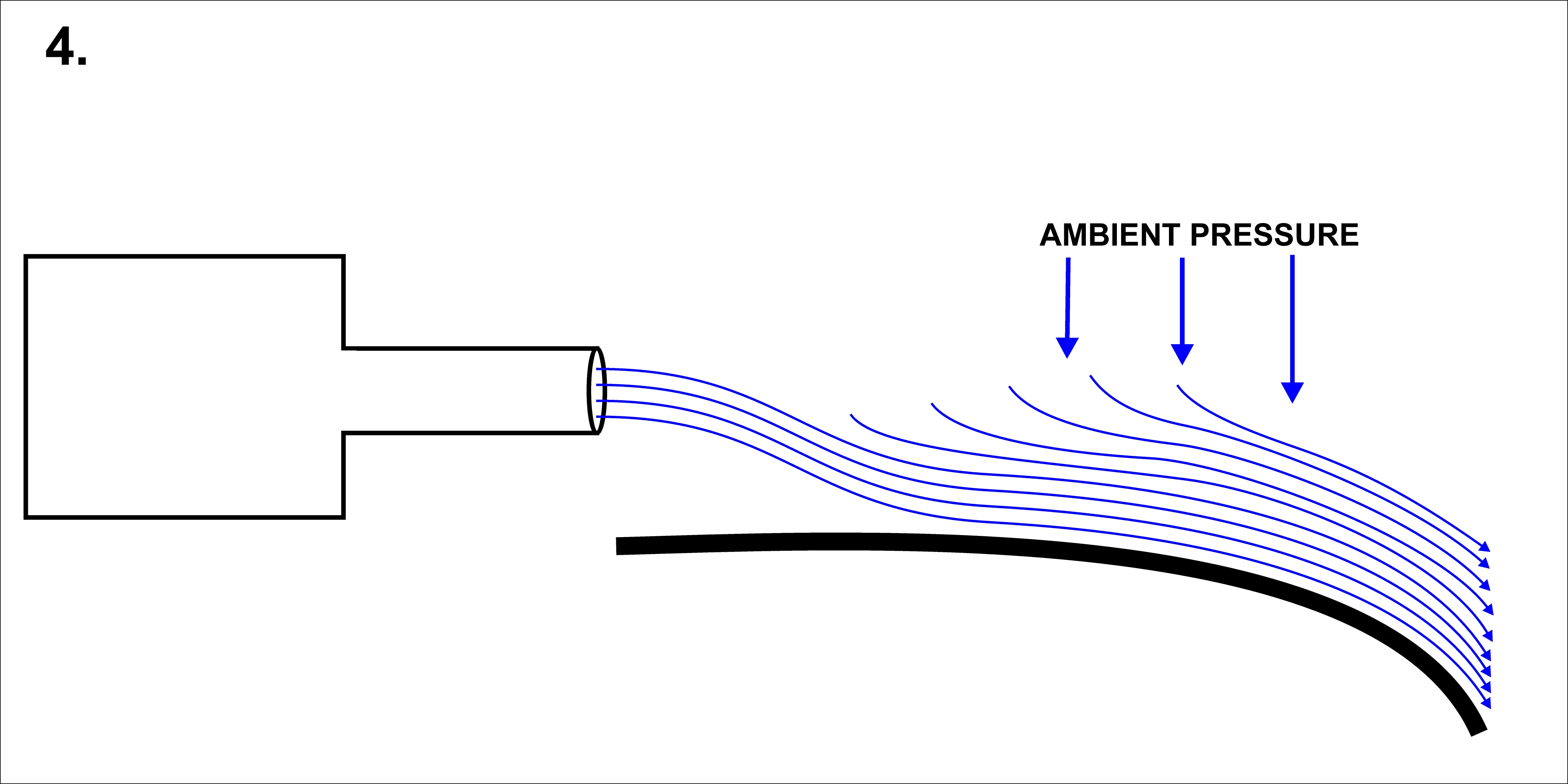
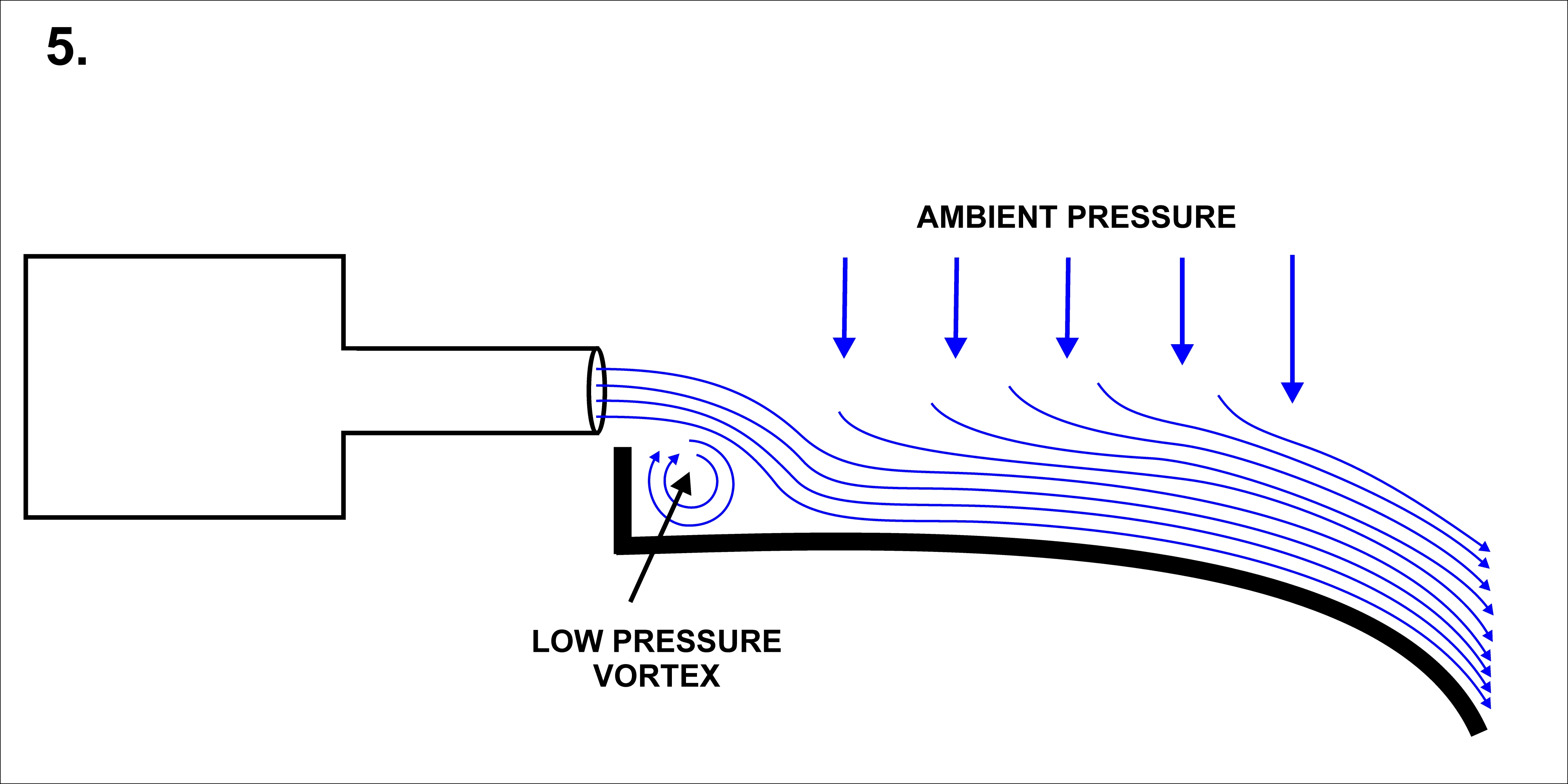

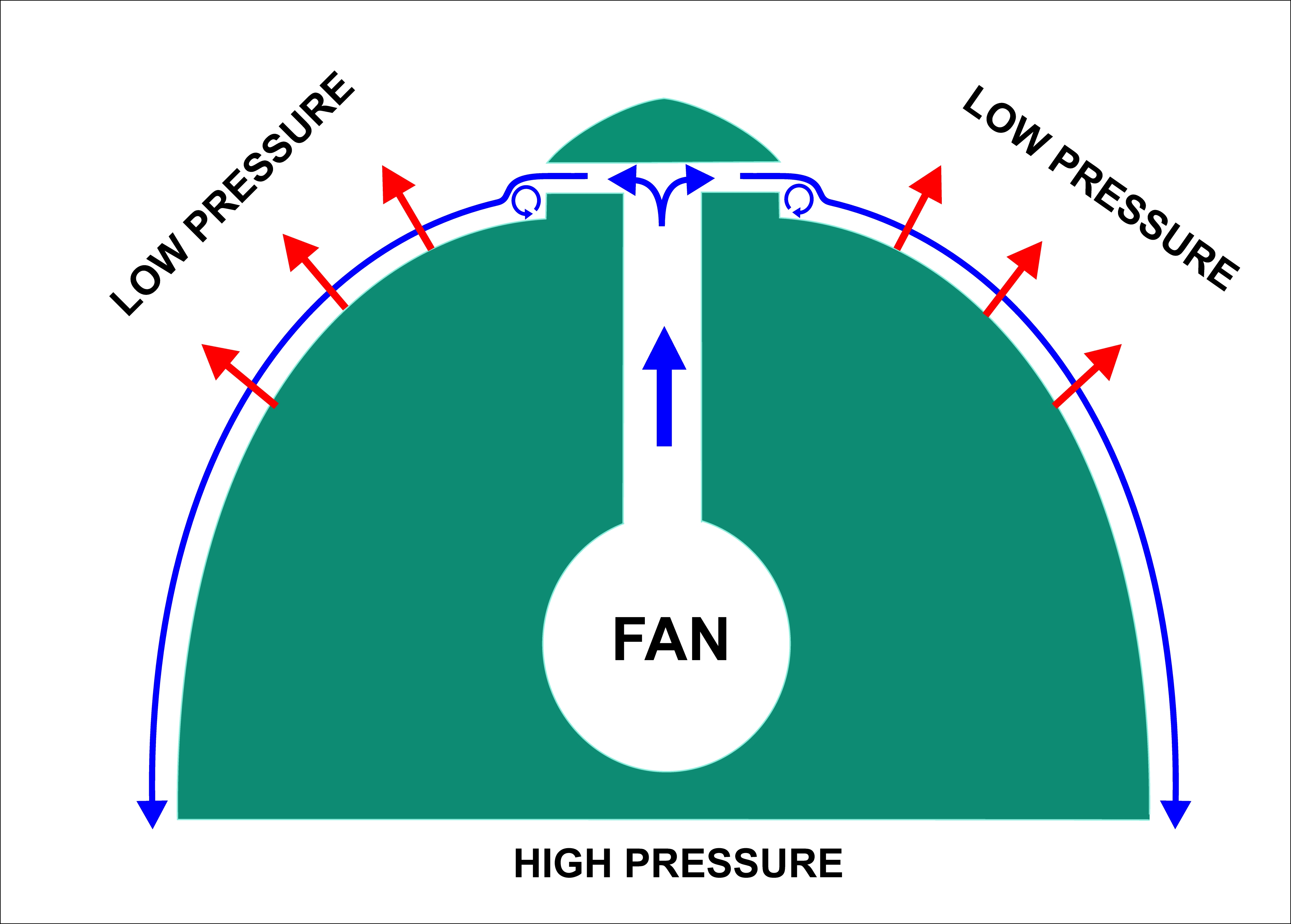
A diagram of a generic engine that harnesses the Coandă effect to generate lift (or forward motion if tilted 90° on its side). The engine is approximately bullet or inverted bowl shaped, with fluid being expelled horizontally from a circular slit near the top of the bullet. A small step at the lower edge of the slit ensures that a low pressure vortex develops immediately below the point where the fluid exits the slit (see Diagram 5). From there on the Coandă effect causes the sheet of fluid to cling to the curved outer surface of the engine. The entrainment of the ambient fluid into the stream flowing over the bullet, causes a low pressure area above the bullet (Diagrams 1–5) . This, together with the ambient ("high") pressure below the bullet causes lift, or, if mounted horizontally, forward motion in the direction of the apex of the bullet.

A free jet of air entrains molecules of air from its immediate surroundings causing an axisymmetrical "tube" or "sleeve" of low pressure around the jet (see Diagram 1). The resultant forces from this low pressure tube end up balancing any perpendicular flow instability, which stabilises the jet in a straight line. However, if a solid surface is placed close, and approximately parallel to the jet (Diagram 2), then the entrainment (and therefore removal) of air from between the solid surface and the jet causes a reduction in air pressure on that side of the jet that cannot be balanced as rapidly as the low pressure region on the "open" side of the jet.

The pressure difference across the jet causes the jet to deviate towards the nearby surface, and then to adhere to it (Diagram 3). The jet adheres even better to curved surfaces (Diagram 4), because each (infinitesimally small) incremental change in direction of the surface brings renews the effect of the initial bending of the jet. If the curvature is not too sharp, the jet can adhere to the surface even after flowing 180° around a cylindrically curved surface, and thus travel in the opposite direction. The forces that cause these changes cause an equal and opposite force on the surface along which the jet flows. These forces can be harnessed to cause lift and other forms of motion, depending on the orientation of the jet and the surface to which the jet adheres. A small surface "lip" at the point where the jet starts to flow over that surface (Diagram 5) increases the initial deviation of the jet flow direction. This results from the fact that a low pressure vortex forms behind the lip, promoting the dip towards the surface.

The Coandă effect can be induced in any fluid, and is therefore equally effective in water and air. A heated airfoil significantly reduces drag.

== Existence conditions ==
Early sources provide theoretical and experimental information needed to derive a detailed explanation of the effect. The Coandă effect may occur along a curved wall either in a free- or wall-jet.

On the left image of the preceding section: "The mechanism of Coandă effect", the effect as described, in the terms of T. Young as "the lateral pressure which eases the inflection of a current of air near an obstacle", represents a free jet emerging from an orifice and an obstacle in the surroundings. It includes the tendency of a free jet emerging from an orifice to entrain fluid from the surroundings confined with limited access, without developing any region of lower pressure when there is no obstacle in the surroundings, as is the case on the opposite side where turbulent mixing occurs at ambient pressure.

On the right image, the effect occurs along the curved wall as a wall jet. The image here on the right represents a two-dimensional wall jet between two parallel plane walls, where the "obstacle" is a quarter cylindrical portion following the flat horizontal rectangular orifice, so that no fluid at all is entrained from the surroundings along the wall, but only on the opposite side in turbulent mixing with ambient air.

=== Wall jet ===
To compare experiment with a theoretical model, a two-dimensional plane wall jet of width (h) along a circular wall of radius (r) is referred to. A wall jet follows a flat horizontal wall, say of infinite radius, or rather whose radius is the radius of the Earth without separation because the surface pressure as well as the external pressure in the mixing zone is everywhere equal to the atmospheric pressure and the boundary layer does not separate from the wall.

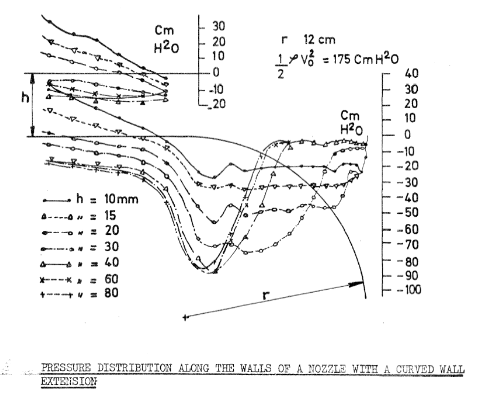
Measurements of surface pressure along a circularly curved wall of radius (r = 12 cm), deflecting a turbulent jet of air (Reynolds number = 10^{6}) of width (h). The pressure begins to fall before the origin of the jet, due to local effects at the point of exit of the air from the nozzle which creates the jet. If the h/r ratio (ratio of the width of the jet to the radius of curvature of the wall) is less than 0.5, a true Coandă effect is observed, with the wall pressures along the curved wall remaining at this low (sub-ambient pressure) level until the jet reaches the end of the wall (when the pressure rapidly returns to ambient pressure). If the h/r ratio is more than 0.5, only the local effects occur at the origin of the jet, after which the jet immediately separates from the wall, and there is no Coandă effect. Experiments by Kadosch and Liermann in Kadosch's laboratory, SNECMA.

With a much smaller radius (12 centimeters in the image on the right) a transverse difference arises between external and wall surface pressures of the jet, creating a pressure gradient depending upon h/r, the relative curvature. This pressure gradient can appear in a zone before and after the origin of the jet where it gradually arises, and disappear at the point where the jet boundary layer separates from the wall, where the wall pressure reaches atmospheric pressure (and the transverse gradient becomes zero).

Experiments made in 1956 with turbulent air jets at a Reynolds number of 10^{6} at various jet widths (h) show the pressures measured along a circularly curved wall radius (r) at a series of horizontal distance from the origin of the jet (see the diagram on the right).

Above a critical h/r ratio of 0.5 only local effects at the origin of the jet are seen extending over a small angle of 18° along the curved wall. The jet then immediately separates from the curved wall. A Coandă effect is therefore not seen here but only a local attachment: a pressure smaller than atmospheric pressure appears on the wall along a distance corresponding to a small angle of 9°, followed by an equal angle of 9° where this pressure increases up to atmospheric pressure at the separation of the boundary layer, subject to this positive longitudinal gradient. However, if the h/r ratio is smaller than the critical value of 0.5, the lower than ambient pressure measured on the wall seen at the origin of the jet continues along the wall (until the wall ends; see diagram on the right). This is "a true Coandă effect" as the jet clings to the wall "at a nearly constant pressure" as in a conventional wall jet.

A calculation made by Woods in 1954 of an inviscid flow along a circular wall shows that an inviscid solution exists with any curvature h/r and any given deflection angle up to a separation point on the wall, where a singular point appears with an infinite slope of the surface pressure curve.

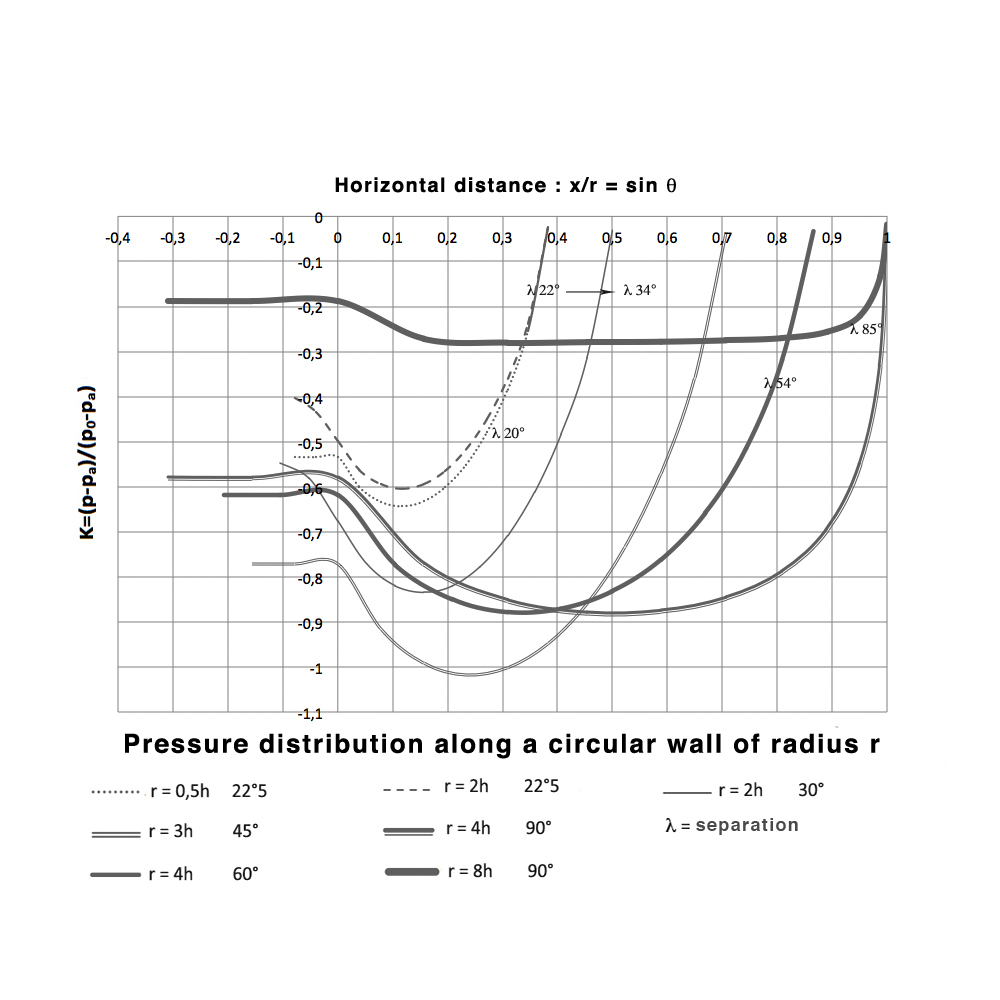
Pressure distribution along the circular wall of a wall jet

Introducing in the calculation the angle at separation found in the preceding experiments for each value of the relative curvature h/r, the image here was recently obtained, and shows inertial effects represented by the inviscid solution: the calculated pressure field is similar to the experimental one described above, outside the nozzle. The flow curvature is caused exclusively by the transverse pressure gradient, as described by T. Young. Then, viscosity only produces a boundary layer along the wall and turbulent mixing with ambient air as in a conventional wall jet—except that this boundary layer separates under the action of the difference between the finally ambient pressure and a smaller surface pressure along the wall. According to Van Dyke, as quoted in Lift, the derivation of his equation (4c) also shows that the contribution of viscous stress to flow turning is negligible.

An alternative way would be to calculate the deflection angle at which the boundary layer subjected to the inviscid pressure field separates. A rough calculation has been tried that gives the separation angle as a function of h/r and the Reynolds number: The results are reported on the image, e.g., 54° calculated instead of 60° measured for h/r = 0.25. More experiments and a more accurate boundary layer calculation would be desirable.

Other experiments made in 2004 with a wall jet along a circular wall show that Coandă effect does not occur in a laminar flow, and the critical h/r ratios for small Reynolds numbers are much smaller than those for turbulent flow. down to h/r = 0.14 with a Reynolds number of 500, and h/r = 0.05 for a Reynolds number of 100.

=== Free jet ===
L. C. Woods also made the calculation of the inviscid two-dimensional flow of a free jet of width h, deflected round a circularly cylindrical surface of radius r, between a first contact A and separation at B, including a deflection angle θ. Again a solution exists for any value of the relative curvature h/r and angle θ. Moreover, in the case of a free jet the equation can be solved in closed form, giving the distribution of velocity along the circular wall. The surface pressure distribution is then calculated using Bernoulli equation. Let us note the pressure (p_{a}) and the velocity (v_{a}) along the free streamline at the ambient pressure, and γ the angle along the wall which is zero in A and θ in B. Then the velocity (v) is found to be:

$$\frac{v}{v_\mathrm{a}} = \exp\left(\frac{2h}{\pi r} \arctan \sqrt{\sinh^2 \left(\frac{\pi\theta r}{4h}\right) - \cosh^2\left(\frac{\pi\theta r}{4h}\right) \tanh^2\left(\frac{\pi\gamma r}{4h}\right)}\,\right)$$

An image of the surface pressure distribution of the jet round the cylindrical surface using the same values of the relative curvature h/r, and the same angle θ as those found for the wall jet reported in the image on the right side here has been established: it may be found in reference (15) p. 104 and both images are quite similar: the Coandă effect of a free jet is inertial, the same as Coandă effect of a wall jet. However, an experimental measurement of the corresponding surface pressure distribution is not known.

Experiments in 1959 by Bourque and Newmann concerning the reattachment of a two-dimensional turbulent jet to an offset parallel plate after enclosing a separation bubble where a low pressure vortex is confined (as in the image 5 in the preceding section) and also for a two-dimensional jet followed by a single flat plate inclined at an angle instead of the circularly curved wall in the diagram on the right here describing the experience of a wall jet: the jet separates from the plate, then curves towards the plate when the surrounding fluid is entrained and pressure lowered, and eventually reattaches to it, enclosing a separation bubble. The jet remains free if the angle is greater than 62°.

In this last case which is the geometry proposed by Coandă, the claim of the inventor is that the quantity of fluid entrained by the jet from the surroundings is increased when the jet is deflected, a feature exploited to improve the scavenging of internal combustion engines, and to increase the maximum lift coefficient of a wing, as indicated in the applications below.

The surface pressure distribution as well as the reattachment distance have been duly measured in both cases, and two approximate theories have been developed for the mean pressure within the separation bubble, the position of reattachment and the increase in volume flow from the orifice: the agreement with experiment was satisfactory.

== Applications ==
=== Aircraft ===
The Coandă effect has applications in various high-lift devices on aircraft, where air moving over the wing can be "bent down" towards the ground using flaps and a jet sheet blowing over the curved surface of the top of the wing. The bending of the flow results in aerodynamic lift. The flow from a high-speed jet engine mounted in a pod over the wing produces increased lift by dramatically increasing the velocity gradient in the shear flow in the boundary layer. In this velocity gradient, particles are blown away from the surface, thus lowering the pressure there. Closely following the work of Coandă on applications of his research, and in particular the work on his "Aerodina Lenticulară," John Frost of Avro Canada also spent considerable time researching the effect, leading to a series of "inside out" hovercraft-like aircraft from which the air exited in a ring around the outside of the aircraft and was directed by being "attached" to a flap-like ring.

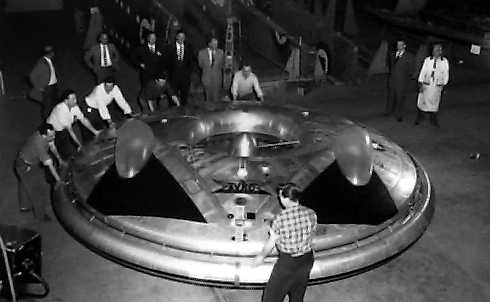
The first Avrocar being readied at the Avro Canada factory in 1958

This is, as opposed to a traditional hovercraft design, in which the air is blown into a central area, the plenum, and directed down with the use of a fabric "skirt". Only one of Frost's designs was ever built, the Avro Canada VZ-9 Avrocar.

The Avrocar (often listed as 'VZ-9') was a Canadian vertical takeoff and landing (VTOL) aircraft developed by Avro Aircraft Ltd. as part of a secret United States military project carried out in the early years of the Cold War. The Avrocar intended to exploit the Coandă effect to provide lift and thrust from a single "turborotor" blowing exhaust out the rim of the disk-shaped aircraft to provide anticipated VTOL-like performance. In the air, it would have resembled a flying saucer. Two prototypes were built as "proof-of-concept" test vehicles for a more advanced U.S. Air Force fighter and also for a U.S. Army tactical combat aircraft requirement.

Avro's 1956 Project 1794 for the U.S. military designed a larger-scale flying saucer based on the Coandă effect and intended to reach speeds between Mach 3 and Mach 4. Project documents remained classified until 2012.

The effect was also implemented during the U.S. Air Force's Advanced Medium STOL Transport (AMST) project. Several aircraft, notably the Boeing YC-14 (the first modern type to exploit the effect), NASA's Quiet Short-Haul Research Aircraft, and the National Aerospace Laboratory of Japan's Asuka research aircraft have been built to take advantage of this effect, by mounting turbofans on the top of the wings to provide high-speed air even at low flying speeds, but to date only one aircraft has gone into production using this system to a major degree which is the Antonov An-72. The Shin Meiwa US-1A flying boat utilizes a similar system, only it directs the propwash from its four turboprop engines over the top of the wing to generate low-speed lift. More uniquely, it incorporates a fifth turboshaft engine inside of the wing center-section solely to provide air for powerful blown flaps. The addition of these two systems gives the aircraft an impressive STOL capability.

A Coandă engine (items 3,6–8) replaces the tail rotor in the NOTAR helicopter. 1 Air intake. 2 Variable pitch fan. 3 Tail boom with Coandă Slots. 4 Vertical stabilizers. 5 Direct jet thruster. 6 Downwash. 7 Circulation control tailboom cross-section. 8 Anti-torque lift.

A depiction of the Blackburn Buccaneer aircraft. Blowing slots at the leading edges of the wing, tailplane and trailing edge flaps/ ailerons are highlighted. These aerodynamic features contribute to the Coandă airflow over the wing.

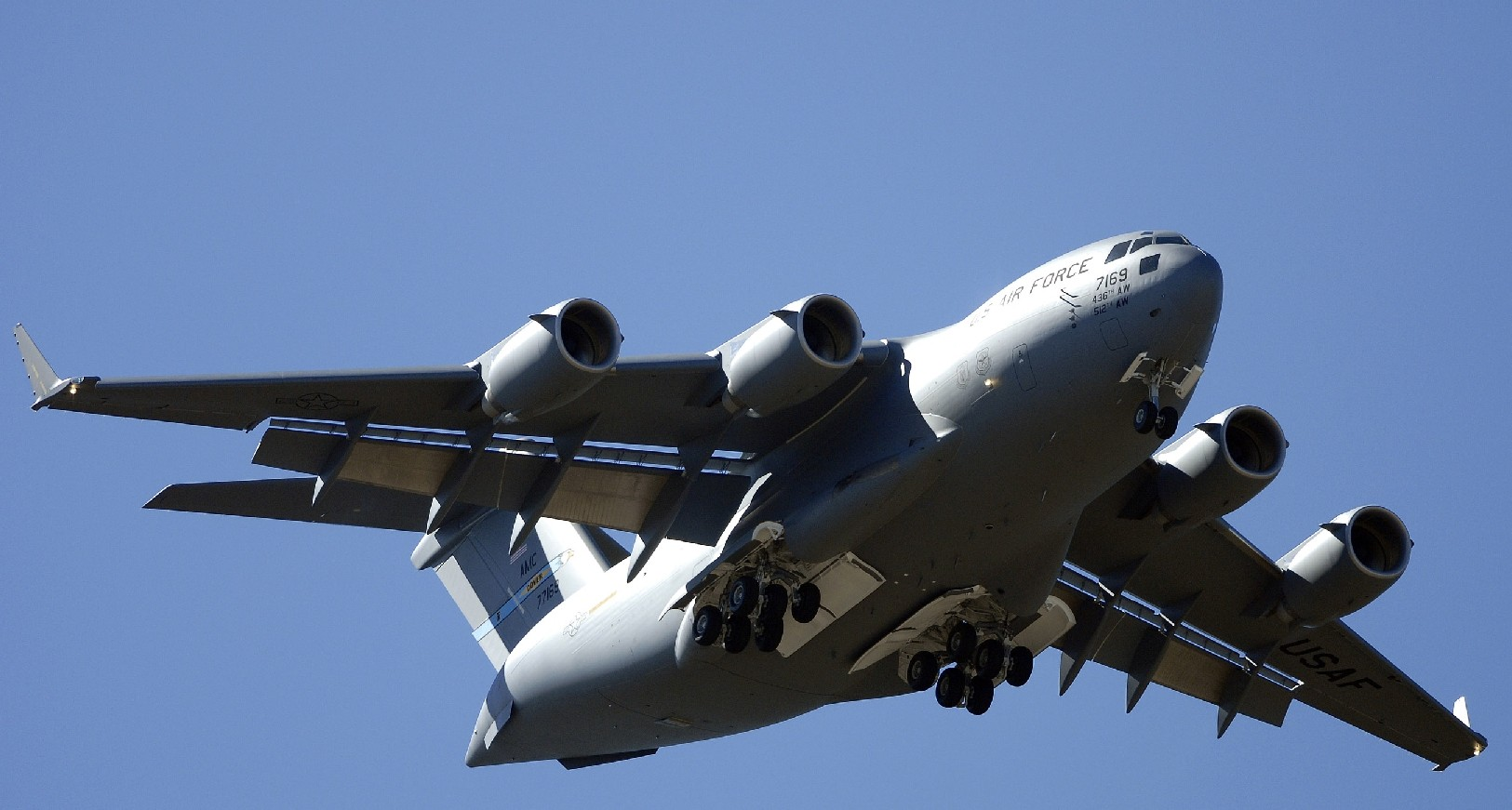
The C-17 Globemaster III has externally blown flaps with part of the engine flow passing through the flap slots to be turned over the top surfaces by the Coandă effect.

The experimental McDonnell Douglas YC-15 and its production derivative, the Boeing C-17 Globemaster III, also employ the effect. The NOTAR helicopter replaces the conventional propeller tail rotor with a Coandă effect tail (diagram on the left).

A better understanding of Coandă effect was provided by the scientific literature produced by ACHEON EU FP7 project. This project utilized a particular symmetric nozzle to produce an effective modeling of the Coandă effect, and determined innovative STOL aircraft configurations based on the effect. This activity has been expanded by Dragan in the turbomachinery sector, with the objective of better optimizing the shape of rotating blades by Romanian Comoti Research Centre's work on turbomachinery.

A practical use of the Coandă effect is for inclined hydropower screens, which separate debris, fish, etc., otherwise in the input flow to the turbines. Due to the slope, the debris falls from the screens without mechanical clearing, and due to the wires of the screen optimizing the Coandă effect, the water flows through the screen to the penstocks leading the water to the turbines.

The Coandă effect is used in dual-pattern fluid dispensers in automobile windshield washers.

The operation principle of oscillatory flowmeters also relies on the Coandă phenomenon. The incoming liquid enters a chamber that contains two "islands". Due to the Coandă effect, the main stream splits up and goes under one of the islands. This flow then feeds itself back into the main stream making it split up again, but in the direction of the second isle. This process repeats itself as long as the liquid circulates the chamber, resulting in a self-induced oscillation that is directly proportional to the velocity of the liquid and consequently the volume of substance flowing through the meter. A sensor picks up the frequency of this oscillation and transforms it into an analog signal yielding volume passing through.

=== Air conditioning ===
In air conditioning, the Coandă effect is exploited to increase the throw of a ceiling mounted diffuser. Because the Coandă effect causes air discharged from the diffuser to "stick" to the ceiling, it travels farther before dropping for the same discharge velocity than it would if the diffuser were mounted in free air, without the neighbouring ceiling. Lower discharge velocity means lower noise levels and, in the case of variable air volume (VAV) air conditioning systems, permits greater turndown ratios. Linear diffusers and slot diffusers that present a greater length of contact with the ceiling exhibit a greater Coandă effect.

=== Health care ===
In cardiovascular medicine, the Coandă effect accounts for the separate streams of blood in the fetal right atrium. It also explains why eccentric mitral regurgitation jets are attracted and dispersed along adjacent left atrial wall surfaces (so called "wall-hugging jets" as seen on echocardiographic color-doppler interrogation). This is clinically relevant because the visual area (and thus severity) of these eccentric wall-hugging jets is often underestimated compared to the more readily apparent central jets. In these cases, volumetric methods such as the proximal isovelocity surface area (PISA) method are preferred to quantify the severity of mitral regurgitation.

In medicine, the Coandă effect is used in ventilators.

=== Meteorology ===
In meteorology, the Coandă effect theory has also been applied to some air streams flowing out of mountain ranges such as the Carpathian Mountains and Transylvanian Alps, where effects on agriculture and vegetation have been noted. It also appears to be an effect in the Rhone Valley in France and near Big Delta in Alaska.

=== Auto-racing ===
In Formula One automobile racing, the Coandă effect has been exploited by the McLaren, Sauber, Ferrari and Lotus teams, after the first introduction by Adrian Newey (Red Bull Team) in 2011, to help redirect exhaust gases to run through the rear diffuser with the intention of increasing downforce at the rear of the car. Due to changes in regulations set in place by the FIA from the beginning of the 2014 Formula One season, the intention of redirecting exhaust gases to use the Coandă effect have been negated, due to the mandatory requirement that the car exhaust not have bodywork intended to contribute to aerodynamic effect situated directly behind it.

=== Fluidics ===
In fluidics, the Coandă effect was used to build bistable multivibrators, where the working stream (compressed air) stuck to one curved wall or another and control beams could switch the stream between the walls.

=== Mixer ===
The Coandă effect is also used to mix two different fluids in a mixer.

== Problems caused ==
Aside from the numerous possible advantages of the Coandă effect being exploited in engineering, its use can engender disadvantages as well.

In marine propulsion, the efficiency of a propeller or thruster can be severely curtailed by the Coandă effect. The force on the vessel generated by a propeller is a function of the speed, volume and direction of the water jet leaving the propeller. Under certain conditions (e.g., when a ship moves through water) the Coandă effect changes the direction of a propeller jet, causing it to follow the shape of the ship's hull. The side force from a tunnel thruster at the bow of a ship decreases rapidly with forward speed. (Note: This problem can be solved by an accurate design of both the propeller and the hull that is specifically optimized from a fluid dynamic point of view. (Lehn 1992)) The side thrust may completely disappear at speeds above about 3 knots. If the Coandă effect is applied to symmetrically shaped nozzles, it presents resonance problems.

== See also ==
- Aerodynamics
- Airfoil
- Boundary layer
- Circulation control wing
- Fluid dynamics
- Fluid friction
- Lift (force)
- Magnus effect
- Microelectromechanical systems
- Microfluidics
- NOTAR
- Teapot effect
- Tesla valve
- Trench effect
- Aerodynamic levitation
