= Blown flap =

High-lift device on some aircraft wings

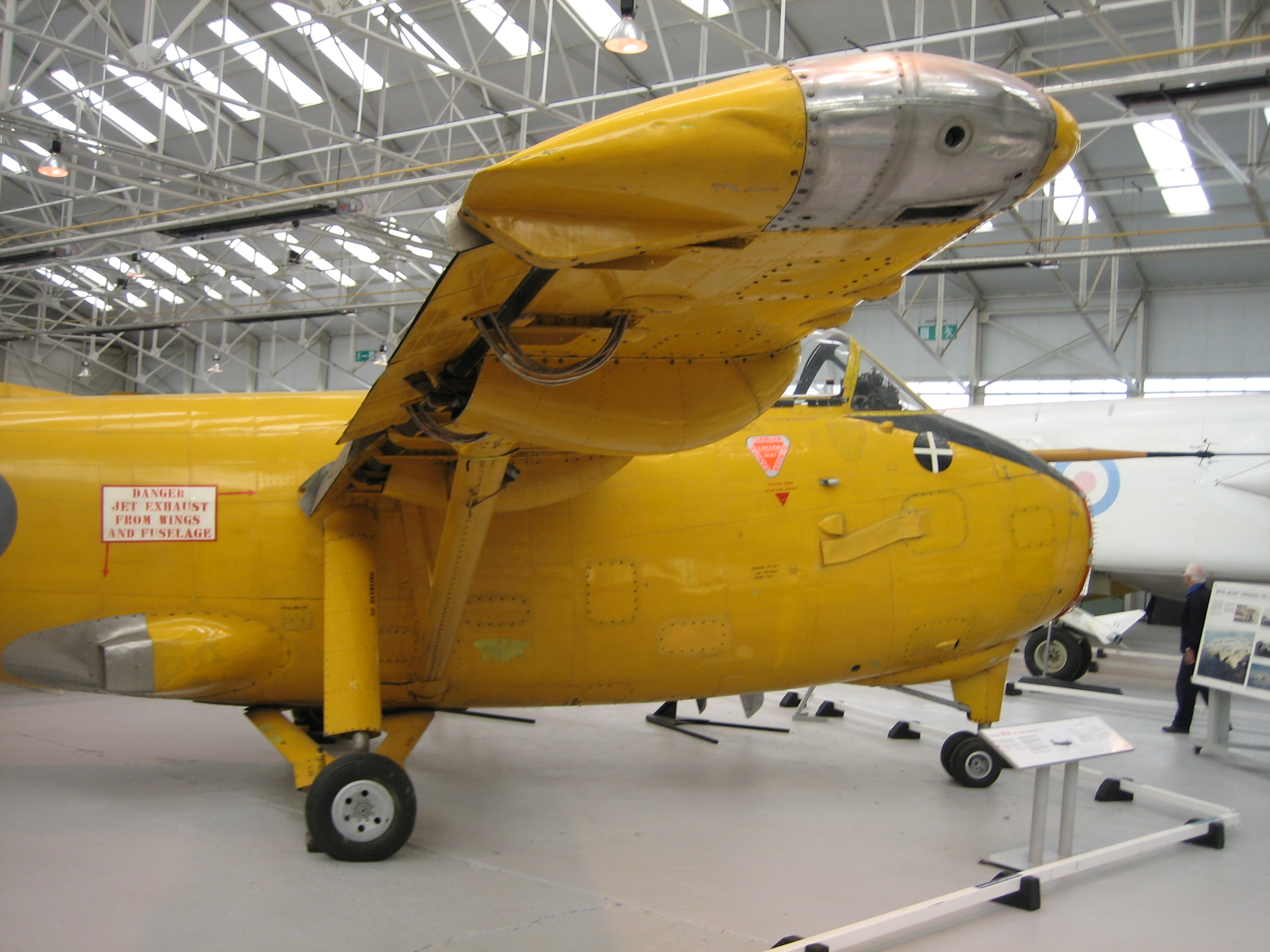
Blown flaps of the Hunting H.126

Blown flaps, blown wing or jet flaps are powered aerodynamic high-lift devices used on the wings of certain aircraft to improve their low-speed flight characteristics. They use air blown through nozzles to shape the airflow over the trailing edge of the wing, directing the flow downward to increase the lift coefficient. There are a variety of methods to achieve this airflow, most of which use jet exhaust or high-pressure air bleed off of a jet engine's compressor and then redirected to follow the line of trailing-edge flaps.

Blown flaps may refer specifically to those systems that use internal ductwork within the wing to direct the airflow, or more broadly to systems like upper surface blowing or nozzle systems on conventional underwing engine that direct air through the flaps. Blown flaps are one solution among a broader category known as powered lift, which also includes various boundary layer control systems, systems using directed prop wash, and circulation control wings.

Internal blown flaps were used on some land and carrier-based fast jets in the 1960s, including the Lockheed F-104, Blackburn Buccaneer and certain versions of the Mikoyan-Gurevich MiG-21. They generally fell from favour because they imposed a significant maintenance overhead in keeping the ductwork clean and various valve systems working properly, along with the disadvantage that an engine failure reduced lift in precisely the situation where it is most desired. The concept reappeared in the form of upper and lower blowing in several transport aircraft, both turboprop and turbofan.

== Mechanism ==
In a conventional blown flap, a small amount of the compressed air produced by the jet engine is "bled" off at the compressor stage and piped to channels running along the rear of the wing. There, it is forced through slots in the wing flaps of the aircraft when the flaps reach certain angles. Injecting high energy air into the boundary layer produces an increase in the stalling angle of attack and maximum lift coefficient by delaying boundary layer separation from the airfoil. Boundary layer control by mass injecting (blowing) prevents boundary layer separation by supplying additional energy to the particles of fluid which are being retarded in the boundary layer. Therefore, injecting a high velocity air mass into the air stream essentially tangent to the wall surface of the airfoil reverses the boundary layer friction deceleration; thus, the boundary layer separation is delayed.

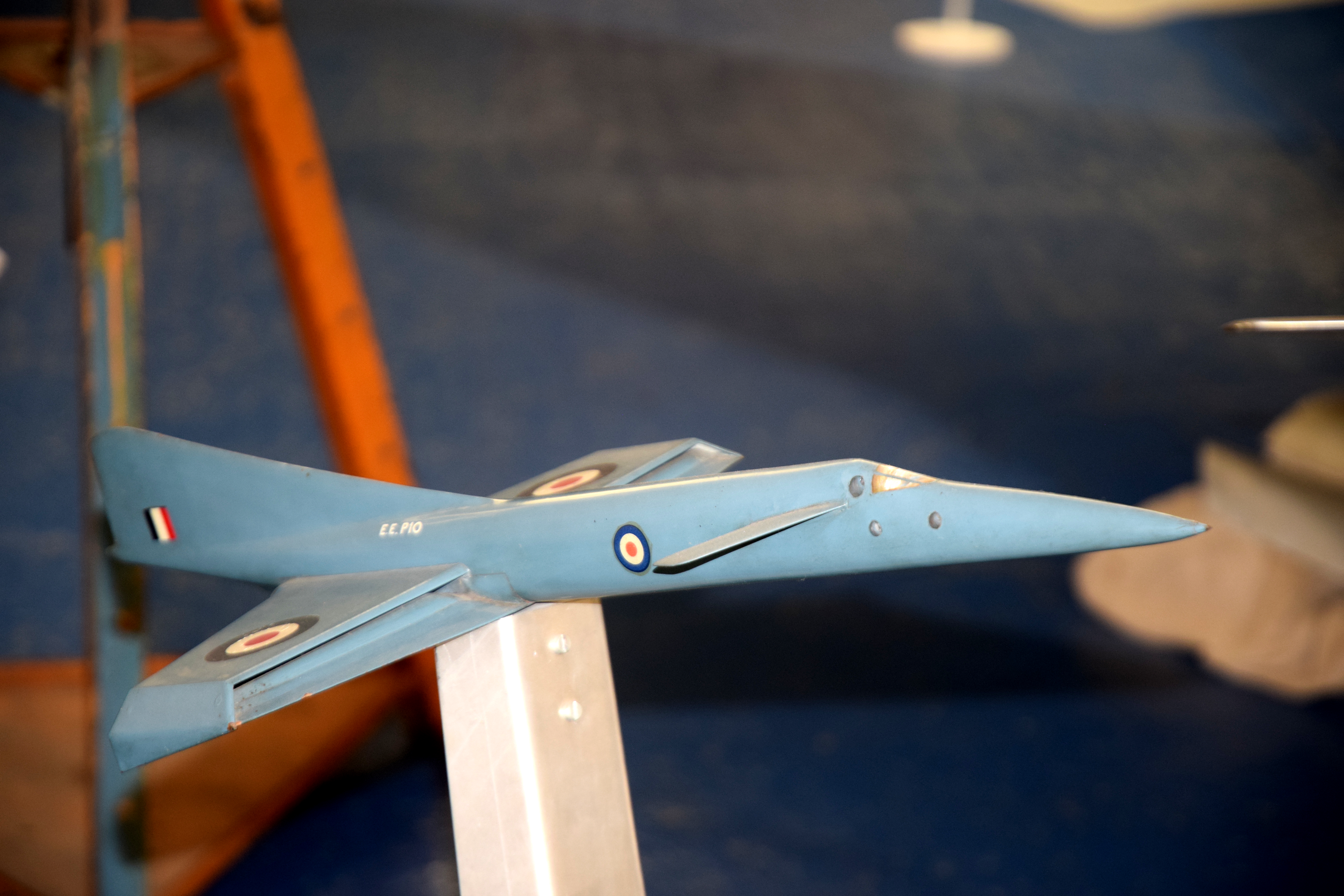
Model of the English Electric P.10 high altitude Mach 3 reconnaissance aircraft proposal with a wing that would be used for both lift and propulsion: two turbojets would have been positioned in the wing roots for take-off (and landing) and to attain a speed where a bank of ramjets, fed by the slot intakes in the leading edge of the wings, would ignite and then be the primary propulsion for the mission

The maximum lift coefficient of a wing can be greatly increased with blowing flow control. With mechanical slots, the natural boundary layer limits the boundary layer control pressure to the freestream total head. Blowing with a small proportion of engine airflow (internal blown flap) increases the lift. Using much higher quantities of gas from the engine exhaust, which increases the effective chord of the flap (the jet flap), produces supercirculation, or forced circulation up to the theoretical potential flow maximum. Surpassing this limit requires the addition of direct thrust.

Development of the general concept continued at NASA in the 1950s and 1960s, leading to simplified systems with similar performance. The externally blown flap arranges the engine to blow across the flaps at the rear of the wing. Some of the jet exhaust is deflected downward directly by the flap, while additional air travels through the slots in the flap and follows the outer edge due to the Coandă effect. The similar upper-surface blowing system arranges the engines over the wing and relies completely on the Coandă effect to redirect the airflow. Although not as effective as direct blowing, these "powered lift" systems are nevertheless quite powerful and much simpler to build and maintain.

A more recent and promising blow-type flow control concept is the counter-flow fluid injection which is able to exert high-authority control to global flows using low energy modifications to key flow regions. In this case, the air blow slit is located at the pressure side near the leading edge stagnation point location and the control air-flow is directed tangentially to the surface but with a forward direction. During the operation of such a flow control system two different effects are present. One effect, boundary layer enhancement, is caused by the increased turbulence levels away from the wall region thus transporting higher-energy outer flow into the wall region. In addition to that another effect, the virtual shaping effect, is utilized to aerodynamically thicken the airfoil at high angles of attack. Both these effects help to delay or eliminate flow separation.

The Nomad 100 is an experimental uncrewed aerial system (UAS) developed by Lockheed Martin subsidiary Sikorsky and introduced in October 2025. It is a Group 3 vertical take-off and landing employing a rotor-blown wing design, intended to combine a helicopter's hover and vertical take-off with the speed, range, and endurance of a winged plane. On the ground, it sits on its tail. Twin proprotors mounted on the wings enable vertical takeoff, landing, and hover. Airborne, it rotates roughly 90 degrees into conventional winged flight. Propulsion is hybrid-electric, pairing electric motors for take-off/landing with a diesel engine for cruising. The Nomad 100 prototype completed its initial ground and flight test campaign in mid-2026.

== History ==
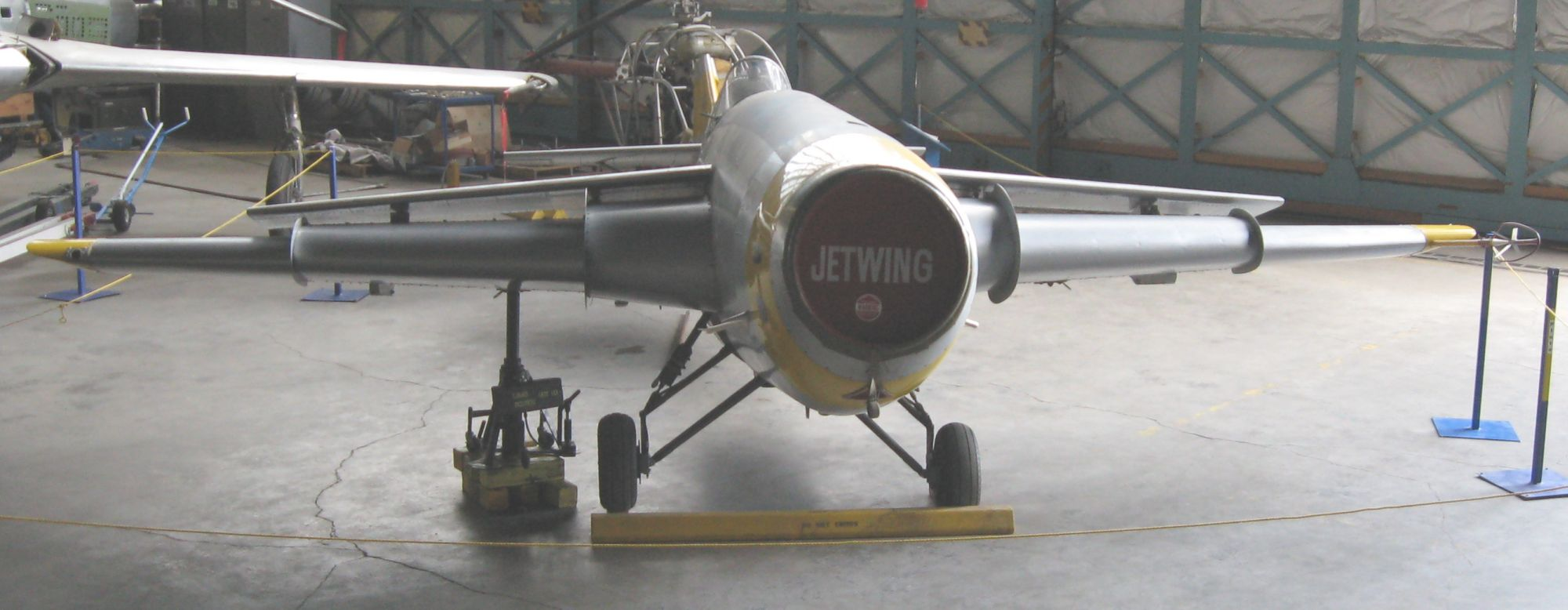
Ball-Bartoe Jetwing used for blown-wing research. Note the "augmentor", intended to direct the discharged airflow over the wing

Flap blowing tests were done at the Royal Aircraft Establishment before the Second World War, and that extensive tests were done during the war in Germany including flight tests with Arado Ar 232, Dornier Do 24 and Messerschmitt Bf 109 aircraft. The Arado and Dornier aircraft used an ejector-driven single flow of air which was sucked over part of the trailing edge span and blown over the remainder. The ejector was chemically powered using high pressure vapour. The Bf 109 used engine-driven blowers for flap blowing.

Tests in France at ONERA after the war combined sucking at the first flap section and blowing at second flap section using a jet engine compressor bleed ejector for power. Flight testing was done on a Breguet Vultur aircraft.

Tests were also done at Westland Aircraft by W.H. Paine producing reports dated 1950 and 1951.

In the United States, a Grumman F9F Panther was modified with flap blowing based on work done by John Attinello in 1951. Engine compressor bleed was used. The system was known as "Supercirculation Boundary Layer Control" or BLC for short.

Between 1951 and 1955, Cessna did flap blowing tests on Cessna 309 and 319 aircraft using the Arado system.

During the 1950s and 60s, fighter aircraft generally evolved towards smaller wings in order to reduce drag at high speeds. Compared to the fighters of a generation earlier, they had wing loadings about four times as high; for instance the Supermarine Spitfire had a wing loading of 24 lb/ft^{2} (117 kg/m^{2}) and the Messerschmitt Bf 109 had the "very high" loading of 30 lb/ft^{2} (146 kg/m^{2}), whereas the 1950s-era Lockheed F-104 Starfighter had 111 lb/ft^{2} (542 kg/m^{2}).

One serious downside to these higher wing loadings is at low speed, when wing lift is insufficient to keep the plane flying. Even huge flaps could not offset this to any large degree, and as a result many aircraft landed at fairly high speeds, increasing accidents.

The major reason flaps were not effective is that the airflow over the wing could only be "bent so much" before it stopped following the wing profile, a condition known as flow separation. Flaps can deflect only a limited amount of air, with can be increased through better flap design; modern airliners use complex multi-part flaps. However, large flaps add complexity, and take up room on the outside of the wing, which makes them unsuitable for use on fighter jets.

The principle of the jet flap, a type of internally blown flap, was proposed and patented in 1952 by the British National Gas Turbine Establishment (NGTE) and thereafter investigated by the NGTE and the Royal Aircraft Establishment. The concept was tested at full-scale on the experimental Hunting H.126. It reduced stall speed to only 32 mph (51 km/h). The jet flap used a large percentage of the engine exhaust, rather than compressor bleed air, for blowing.

A Buccaneer with the blowing slots visible on the leading edges. The extended flaps are contributing to the Coanda airflow over the wing.

One of the first production aircraft with blown flaps was the Lockheed F-104 Starfighter, which entered service in January 1958. After prolonged development problems, the BLCS proved to be useful in compensating for the Starfighter's tiny wing surface. The Lockheed T2V SeaStar, with blown flaps, had entered service in May 1957 but had persistent maintenance problems with the BLCS which led to its early retirement. In June 1958, the Supermarine Scimitar with blown flaps entered service. Blown flaps were used on the North American Aviation A-5 Vigilante, the Vought F-8 Crusader variants E(FN) and J, the McDonnell Douglas F-4 Phantom II and the Blackburn Buccaneer. The Mikoyan-Gurevich MiG-21 and Mikoyan-Gurevich MiG-23 had blown flaps. Petrov states long-term operation of these aircraft showed high reliability of the BLC systems. The TSR-2, which was cancelled before it entered service, had full-span blown flaps.

Starting in the 1970s, the lessons of air combat over Vietnam led to an emphasis on maneuverability and load capacity over raw speed. The result is a move to larger planforms to increase lift. For instance the General Dynamics F-16 Fighting Falcon has a wing loading of 78.5 lb/ft^{2} (383 kg/m^{2}), and uses leading edge extensions to provide more lift at higher angles of attack, including approach and landing. Some later combat aircraft achieved the required low-speed characteristics using swing-wings. Internal flap blowing is still used to supplement externally blown flaps on the Shin Meiwa US-1A.

As of 2015 some aircraft that require STOL performance use external flap blowing and, in some cases, internal flap blowing on flaps and control surfaces such as the rudder to ensure adequate control and stability at low speeds. External blowing concepts are known as the "externally blown flap" (used on the Boeing C-17 Globemaster), "upper surface blowing" (used on the Antonov An-72 and Antonov An-74) and "vectored slipstream", or "over the wing blowing", used on the Antonov An-70 and the Shin Meiwa US-1A and ShinMaywa US-2.

Powered high-lift systems, such as externally blown flaps, are not used for civil transport aircraft for reasons given by Reckzeh, which include complexity, weight, cost, sufficient existing runway lengths and certification rules.

== See also ==
- Boundary layer
- Boundary layer control
- Coandă effect
- Circulation control wing
- Thrust vectoring
