= Flap (aeronautics) =

Anti-stalling high-lift device on aircraft

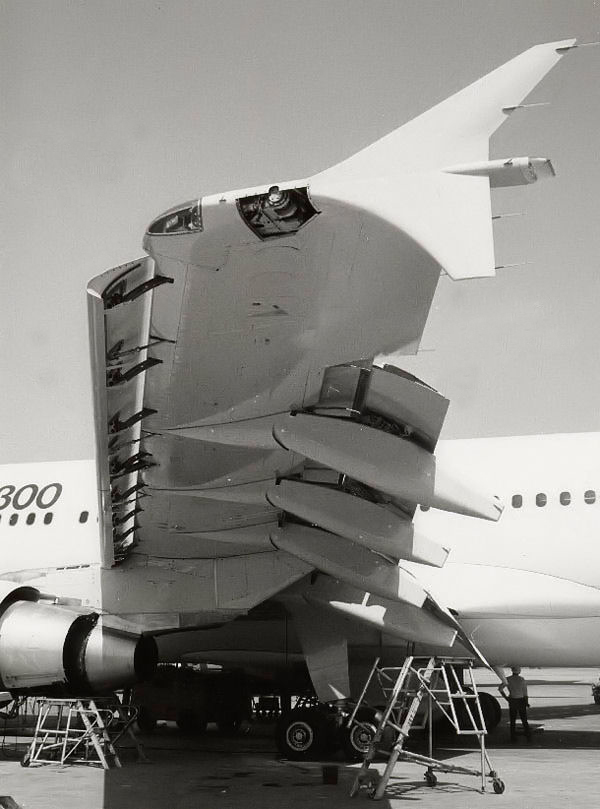
Trailing edge flaps extended on the right on a typical airliner (an Airbus A310-300). Leading edge slats are also extended, on the left.

A flap is a high-lift device used to reduce the stalling speed of an aircraft wing at a given weight. Flaps are usually mounted on the wing trailing edges of a fixed-wing aircraft. Flaps are used to reduce the take-off distance and the landing distance. Flaps also cause an increase in drag so they are retracted when not needed.

The flaps installed on most aircraft are partial-span flaps; spanwise from near the wing root to the inboard end of the ailerons. When partial-span flaps are extended they alter the spanwise lift distribution on the wing by causing the inboard half of the wing to supply an increased proportion of the lift, and the outboard half to supply a reduced proportion of the lift. Reducing the proportion of the lift supplied by the outboard half of the wing is accompanied by a reduction in the angle of attack on the outboard half. This is beneficial because it increases the margin above the stall of the outboard half, maintaining aileron effectiveness and reducing the likelihood of asymmetric stall, and spinning. The ideal lift distribution across a wing is elliptical, and extending partial-span flaps causes a significant departure from the elliptical. This increases lift-induced drag which can be beneficial during approach and landing because it allows the aircraft to descend at a steeper angle.

Extending the wing flaps increases the camber or curvature of the wing, raising the maximum lift coefficient or the upper limit to the lift a wing can generate. This allows the aircraft to generate the required lift at a lower speed, reducing the minimum speed (known as stall speed) at which the aircraft will safely maintain flight. For most aircraft configurations, a useful side effect of flap deployment is a decrease in aircraft pitch angle which lowers the nose thereby improving the pilot's view of the runway over the nose of the aircraft during landing.

There are many different designs of flaps, with the specific choice depending on the size, speed and complexity of the aircraft on which they are to be used, as well as the era in which the aircraft was designed. Plain flaps, slotted flaps, and Fowler flaps are the most common. Krueger flaps are positioned on the leading edge of the wings and are used on many jet airliners. The Fowler, Fairey-Youngman and Gouge types of flap increase the wing area in addition to changing the camber. The larger lifting surface reduces wing loading, hence further reducing the stalling speed.

Some flaps are fitted elsewhere. Leading-edge flaps form the wing leading edge and when deployed they rotate down to increase the wing camber. The de Havilland DH.88 Comet racer had flaps running beneath the fuselage and forward of the wing trailing edge. Many of the Waco Custom Cabin series biplanes have the flaps at mid-chord on the underside of the top wing.

== Principles of operation ==
The general airplane lift equation demonstrates these relationships:

$$L = \tfrac12 \rho V^2 S C_L$$

where:

- L is the amount of Lift produced,
- $\rho$ is the air density,
- V is the true airspeed of the airplane or the Velocity of the airplane, relative to the air
- S is the area of the wing
- $C_L$ is the lift coefficient, which is determined by the shape of the airfoil used and the angle at which the wing meets the air (or angle of attack).

Here, it can be seen that increasing the area (S) and lift coefficient ($C_L$) allow a similar amount of lift to be generated at a lower airspeed (V). Thus, flaps are extensively in use for short takeoffs and landings (STOL).

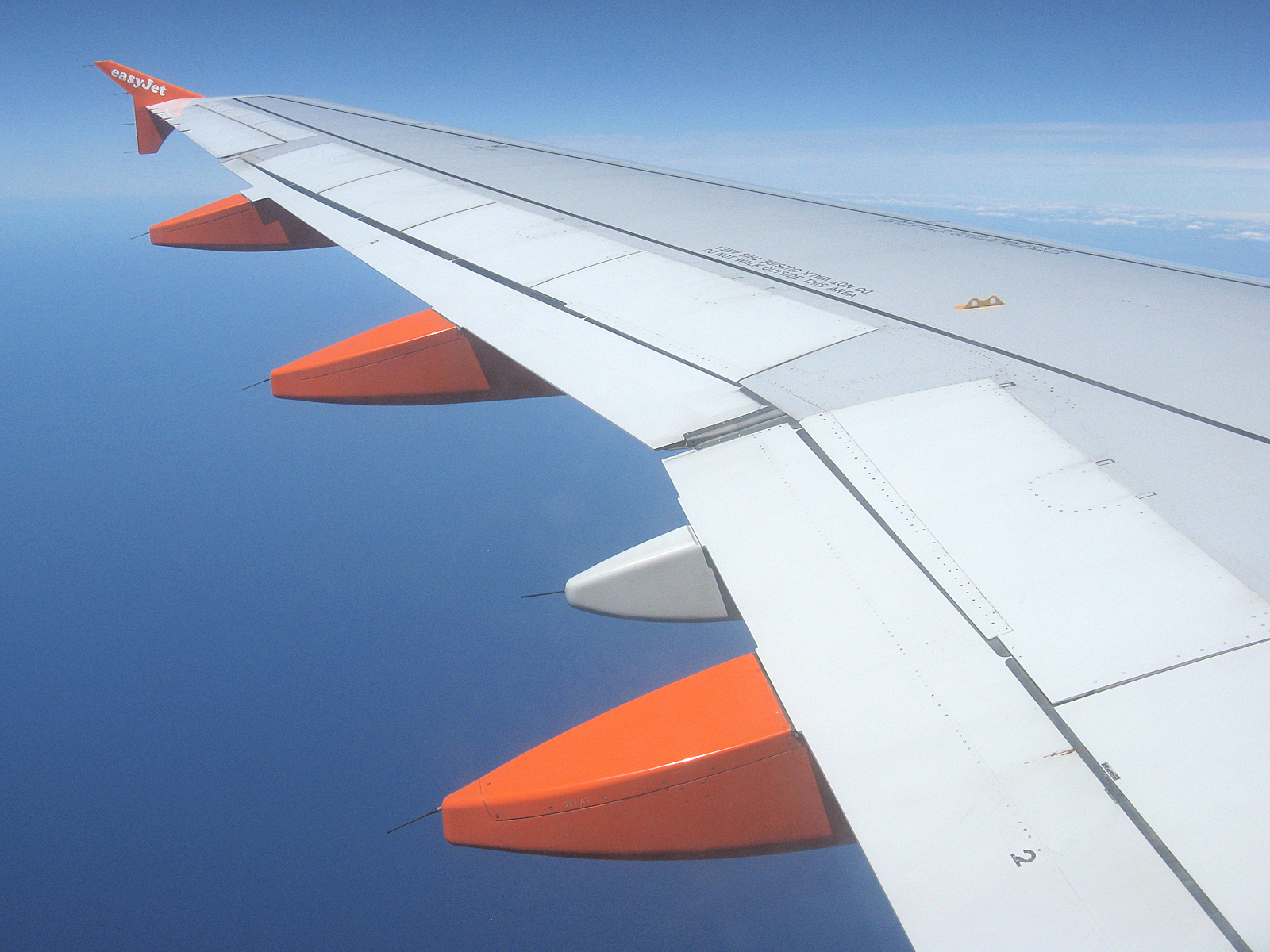
The three orange pods are fairings streamlining the flap track mechanisms. The flaps (two on each side, on the Airbus A319) lie directly above these.

Extending the flaps also increases the drag coefficient of the aircraft. Therefore, for any given weight and airspeed, flaps increase the drag force. Flaps increase the drag coefficient of an aircraft due to higher induced drag caused by the distorted spanwise lift distribution on the wing with flaps extended. Some flaps increase the wing area and, for any given speed, this also increases the parasitic drag component of total drag.

=== Flaps during takeoff ===
Depending on the aircraft type, flaps may be partially extended for takeoff. When used during takeoff, flaps trade runway distance for climb rate: using flaps reduces ground roll but also reduces the climb rate. The amount of flap used on takeoff is specific to each type of aircraft, and the manufacturer will suggest limits and may indicate the reduction in climb rate to be expected. The Cessna 172S Pilot Operating Handbook recommends 10° of flaps on takeoff, when the ground is soft or it is a short runway, otherwise 0 degrees is used.

=== Flaps during landing ===
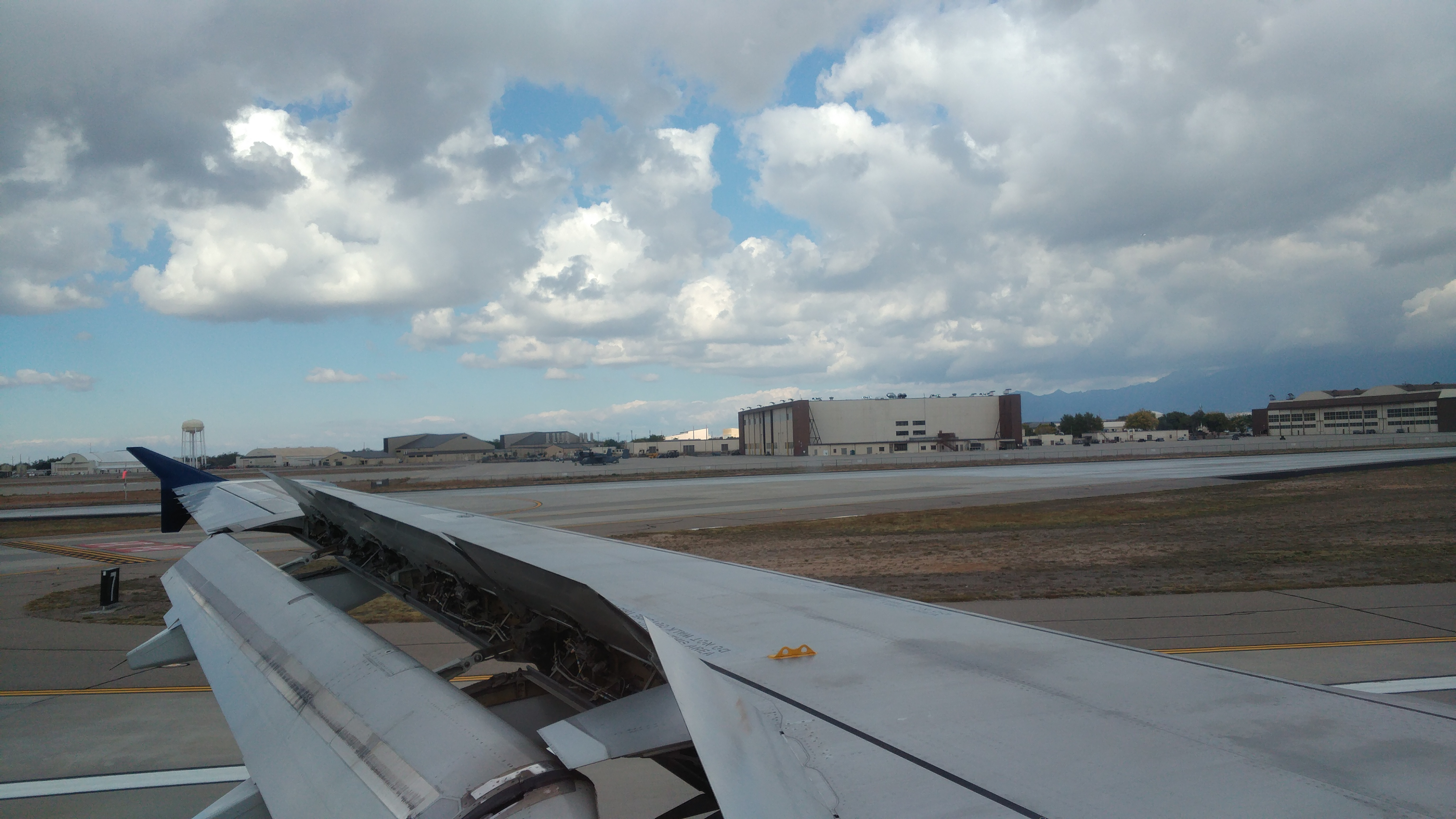
Flaps during ground roll after landing, with spoilers up, increasing drag.

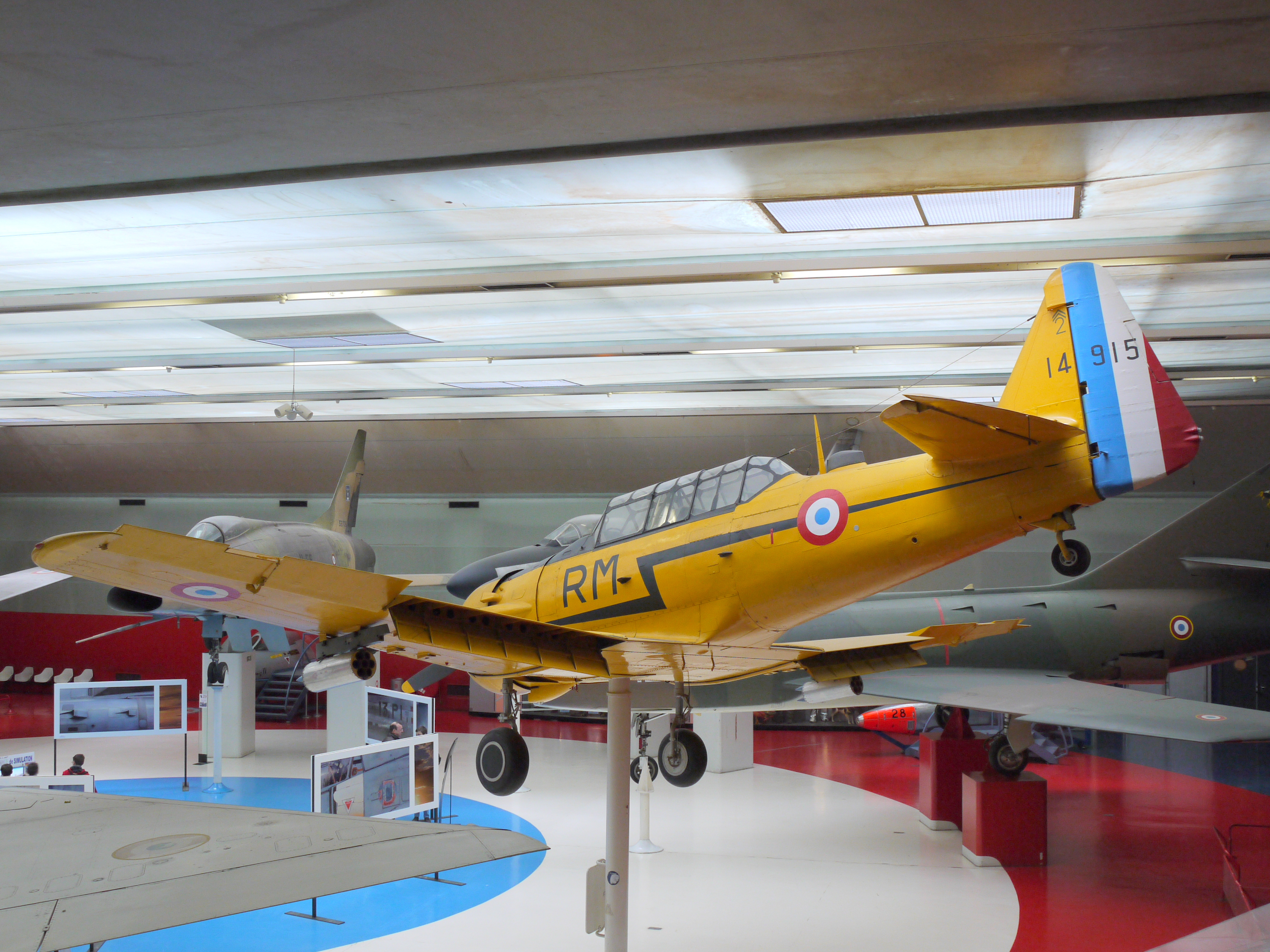
North American T-6 trainer, showing its split flaps

Flaps may be fully extended for landing to give the aircraft a lower stall speed so the approach to landing can be flown more slowly, which also allows the aircraft to land in a shorter distance. The higher drag and lower stalling speed associated with fully extended flaps allow a steeper and slower approach to the landing site, but imposes handling difficulties in aircraft with very low wing loading (i.e. having little weight and a large wing area). Winds across the line of flight, known as crosswinds, cause the windward side of the aircraft to generate more lift and drag, causing the aircraft to roll, yaw and pitch off its intended flight path, and as a result many light aircraft land with reduced flap settings in crosswinds. Furthermore, once the aircraft is on the ground, the flaps may decrease the effectiveness of the brakes since the wing is still generating lift and preventing the entire weight of the aircraft from resting on the tires, thus increasing stopping distance, particularly in wet or icy conditions. Usually, the pilot will raise the flaps as soon as possible to prevent this from occurring.

=== Maneuvering flaps ===
Some gliders not only use flaps when landing, but also in flight to optimize the camber of the wing for the chosen speed. While thermalling, flaps may be partially extended to reduce the stall speed so that the glider can be flown more slowly and thereby reduce the rate of sink, which lets the glider use the rising air of the thermal more efficiently, and to turn in a smaller circle to make best use of the core of the thermal. At higher speeds a negative flap setting is used to reduce the nose-down pitching moment. This reduces the balancing load required on the horizontal stabilizer, which in turn reduces the trim drag associated with keeping the glider in longitudinal trim. Negative flap may also be used during the initial stage of an aerotow launch and at the end of the landing run in order to maintain better control by the ailerons.

Like gliders, some fighters such as the Nakajima Ki-43 also use special flaps to improve maneuverability during air combat (manually operated, just a fowler flap), reducing the stalling speed and allowing for much tighter turns. The flaps used for this must be designed specifically to handle the greater stresses and most flaps have a maximum speed at which they can be deployed. Control line model aircraft built for precision aerobatics competition usually have a type of maneuvering flap system that moves them in an opposing direction to the elevators, to assist in tightening the radius of a maneuver.

"Goerge 21" and others had analog computing automatic dog-fighting flap system. (ja: 自動空戦フラップ )

=== Flap tracks ===
Manufactured most often from PH steels and titanium, flap tracks control the flaps located on the trailing edge of an aircraft's wings. Extending flaps often run on guide tracks. Where these run outside the wing structure they may be faired in to streamline them and protect them from damage. Some flap track fairings are designed to act as anti-shock bodies, which reduce drag caused by local sonic shock waves where the airflow becomes transonic at high speeds.

=== Thrust gates ===
Thrust gates, or gaps, in the trailing edge flaps may be required to minimise interference between the engine flow and deployed flaps. In the absence of an inboard aileron, which provides a gap in many flap installations, a modified flap section may be needed. The thrust gate on the Boeing 757 was provided by a single-slotted flap in between the inboard and outboard double-slotted flaps. The A320, A330, A340 and A380 have no inboard aileron. No thrust gate is required in the continuous, single-slotted flap. Interference in the go-around case while the flaps are still fully deployed can cause increased drag which must not compromise the climb gradient.

== Types of flap ==
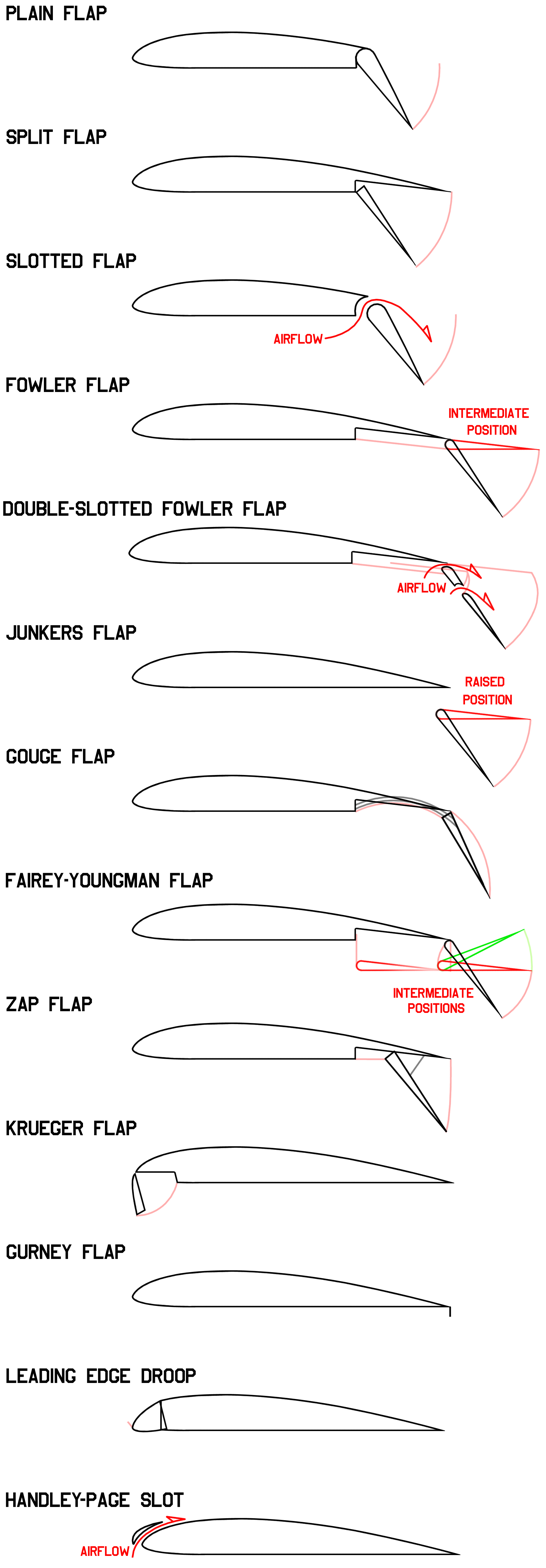
Flaps and high-lift devices. Gurney flap exaggerated for clarity. Blown flap skipped as it is modified from any other type. Pale lines indicate line of movement, and green indicates flap setting used during dive.

=== Plain flap ===
The rear portion of airfoil rotates downwards on a simple hinge mounted at the front of the flap. The Royal Aircraft Factory and National Physical Laboratory in the United Kingdom tested flaps in 1913 and 1914, but these were never installed in an actual aircraft. In 1916, the Fairey Aviation Company made a number of improvements to a Sopwith Baby they were rebuilding, including their Patent Camber Changing Gear, making the Fairey Hamble Baby as they renamed it, the first aircraft to fly with flaps. These were full-span plain flaps which incorporated ailerons, making it also the first instance of flaperons. Fairey were not alone however, as Breguet soon incorporated automatic flaps into the lower wing of their Breguet 14 reconnaissance/bomber in 1917. Owing to the greater efficiency of other flap types, the plain flap is normally only used where simplicity is required.

=== Split flap ===
The rear portion of the lower surface of the airfoil hinges downwards from the leading edge of the flap, while the upper surface stays immobile. This can cause large changes in longitudinal trim, pitching the nose either down or up. At full deflection, a split flaps acts much like a spoiler, adding significantly to drag coefficient. It also adds a little to lift coefficient. It was invented by Orville Wright and James M. H. Jacobs in 1920, but only became common in the 1930s and was then quickly superseded. The Supermarine Spitfire and Douglas DC-1 (progenitor to the DC-3 and C-47) are two of the many 1930s aircraft types to use split flaps.

=== Slotted flap ===
A gap between the flap and the wing forces high pressure air from below the wing over the flap helping the airflow remain attached to the flap, increasing the maximum lift coefficient compared to a split flap. Additionally, pressure across the entire chord of the primary airfoil is greatly reduced as the velocity of air leaving its trailing edge is raised, from the typical non-flap 80% of freestream, to that of the higher-speed, lower-pressure air flowing around the leading edge of the slotted flap. Any flap that allows air to pass between the wing and the flap is considered a slotted flap. The slotted flap was a result of research at Handley-Page, a variant of the slot that dates from the 1920s, but was not widely used until much later. Some flaps use multiple slots to further boost the effect.

=== Fowler flap ===
A split flap that slides backwards, before hinging downward, thereby increasing first chord, then camber. The flap may form part of the upper surface of the wing, like a plain flap, or it may not, like a split flap, but it must slide rearward before lowering. As a defining feature – distinguishing it from the Gouge Flap – it always provides a slot effect.

The flap was invented by Harlan D. Fowler in 1924, and tested by Fred Weick at NACA in 1932. First used on the Martin 146 prototype in 1935, it entered production on the 1937 Lockheed Super Electra, and remains in widespread use on modern aircraft, often with multiple slots.

=== Junkers flap ===
A slotted plain flap fixed below the trailing edge of the wing, and rotating about its forward edge. When not in use, it has more drag than other types, but is more effective at reducing stalling speed than a plain or split flap, while retaining their mechanical simplicity. Invented by Otto Mader at Junkers in the late 1920s, they were most often seen on the Junkers Ju 52 and the Junkers Ju 87 Stuka, though the same basic design can also be found on many modern ultralights, like the Denney Kitfox. This type of flap is sometimes referred to as an external-airfoil flap.

=== Gouge flap ===
A type of split flap that slides backward along curved tracks that force the trailing edge downward, increasing chord and camber without affecting trim or requiring any additional mechanisms. It was invented by Arthur Gouge for Short Brothers in 1936 and used on the Short Empire and Sunderland flying boats, which used the very thick Shorts A.D.5 airfoil. Short Brothers may have been the only company to use this type.

=== Fairey-Youngman flap ===
Drops down (becoming a Junkers Flap) before sliding aft and then rotating up or down. Fairey was one of the few exponents of this design, which was used on the Fairey Firefly and Fairey Barracuda. When in the extended position, it could be angled up (to a negative angle of incidence) so that the aircraft could be dived vertically without needing excessive trim changes.

=== Zap flap ===
The Zap flap was invented by Edward F. Zaparka while he was with Berliner/Joyce and tested on a General Airplanes Corporation Aristocrat in 1932 and on other types periodically thereafter, but it saw little use on production aircraft other than on the Northrop P-61 Black Widow. The leading edge of the flap is mounted on a track, while a point at mid chord on the flap is connected via an arm to a pivot just above the track. When the flap's leading edge moves aft along the track, the triangle formed by the track, the shaft and the surface of the flap (fixed at the pivot) gets narrower and deeper, forcing the flap down.

=== Krueger flap ===
A hinged flap which folds out from under the wing's leading edge while not forming a part of the leading edge of the wing when retracted. This increases the camber and thickness of the wing, which in turn reduces stalling speed and increases drag. This is not the same as a leading edge droop flap, as that is formed from the entire leading edge. Invented by Werner Krüger in 1943 and evaluated in Goettingen, Krueger flaps are found on many modern swept wing airliners.

=== Gurney flap ===
A small fixed perpendicular tab of between 1 and 2% of the wing chord, mounted on the high pressure side of the trailing edge of an airfoil. It was named for racing car driver Dan Gurney who rediscovered it in 1971, and has since been used on some helicopters such as the Sikorsky S-76B to correct control problems without having to resort to a major redesign. It boosts the efficiency of even basic theoretical airfoils (made up of a triangle and a circle overlapped) to the equivalent of a conventional airfoil. The principle was discovered in the 1930s, but was rarely used and was then forgotten. Late marks of the Supermarine Spitfire used a bead on the trailing edge of the elevators, which functioned in a similar manner.

=== Leading edge flap ===
The entire leading edge of the wing rotates downward, effectively increasing camber and also slightly reducing chord. Most commonly found on fighters with very thin wings unsuited to other leading edge high lift devices. Slats are one of such devices, Slats are extendable high lift devices on the leading edge of the wings of some fixed wing aircraft. Their purpose is to increase lift during low speed operations such as take-off, initial climb, approach and landing.

=== Blown flap ===
A type of Boundary Layer Control System, blown flaps pass engine-generated air or exhaust over the flaps to reduce stalling speed below that attainable with mechanical flaps. Types include the original (internally blown flap) which blows compressed air from the engine over the top of the flap, the externally blown flap, which blows engine exhaust over the upper and lower surfaces of the flap, and upper surface blowing which blows engine exhaust over the top of the wing and flap. While testing was done in Britain and Germany before the Second World War, and flight trials started, the first production aircraft with blown flaps was not until the 1957 Lockheed T2V SeaStar. Upper Surface Blowing was used on the Boeing YC-14 in 1976.

=== Flexible flap ===
Also known as the FlexFoil, a modern interpretation of wing warping, internal mechanical actuators bend a lattice that changes the airfoil shape. It may have a flexible gap seal at the transition between fixed and flexible airfoils.

=== Flaperon ===
A type of aircraft control surface that combines the functions of both flaps and ailerons.

=== Continuous trailing-edge flap ===
As of 2014, U.S. Army Research Laboratory (ARL) researchers at NASA's Langley Research Center developed an active-flap design for helicopter rotor blades. The Continuous Trailing-Edge Flap (CTEF) uses components to change blade camber during flight, eliminating mechanical hinges in order to improve system reliability. Prototypes were constructed for wind-tunnel testing.

A team from ARL completed a live-fire test of a rotor blade with individual blade control technology in January 2016. The live fire experiments explored the ballistic vulnerability of blade control technologies. Researchers fired three shots representative of typical ground fire on a 7-foot-span, 10-inch-chord rotor blade section with a 4-foot-long CTEF at ARL's Airbase Experimental Facility.

=== Related devices ===
- Leading edge slats and slots are mounted on the top of the wings' leading edge and while they may be either fixed or retractable, when deployed they provide a slot or gap under the slat to force air against the top of the wing, which is absent on a Krueger flap. They enhance controllability at low speeds. Leading edge slats allow the wing to fly at a higher angle of attack which decrease takeoff and landing distances. Other types of flaps may be equipped with one or more slots to increase their effectiveness, a typical setup on many modern airliners. These are known as slotted flaps as described above. Frederick Handley Page experimented with fore and aft slot designs in the 20s and 30s.
- Spoilers are intended to increase drag by "spoiling" the airflow over the wing. A spoiler is much larger than a Gurney flap, and can be retracted. Spoilers are usually installed mid chord on the upper surface of the wing, but may also be installed on the lower surface of the wing as well.
- Air brakes are used to increase drag, allowing the aircraft to descend at a steep angle or decelerate rapidly.
- Ailerons are similar to flaps (and work the same way), but are intended to provide lateral control, rather than to change the lifting characteristics of both wings together, and so operate differentially – when an aileron on one half-wing increases the lift on that half-wing, the opposite aileron does not, and will often work to decrease lift on its half-wing. When ailerons are designed to lower in conjunction with flaps, they are usually called flaperons, while those that spoil the airflow (typically placed on the upper surface before the trailing edge) they are called spoilerons.
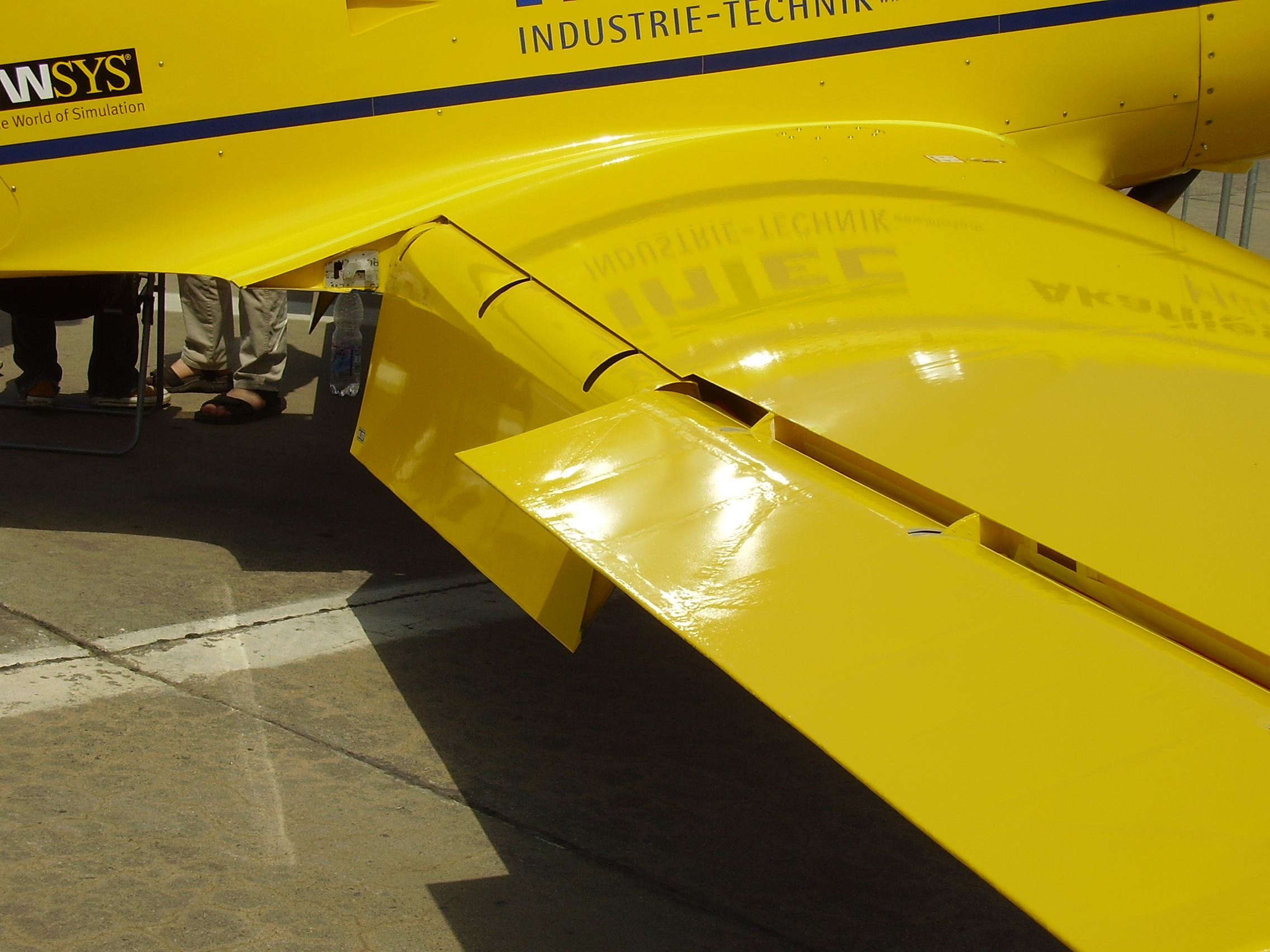
Plain flap at full deflection.

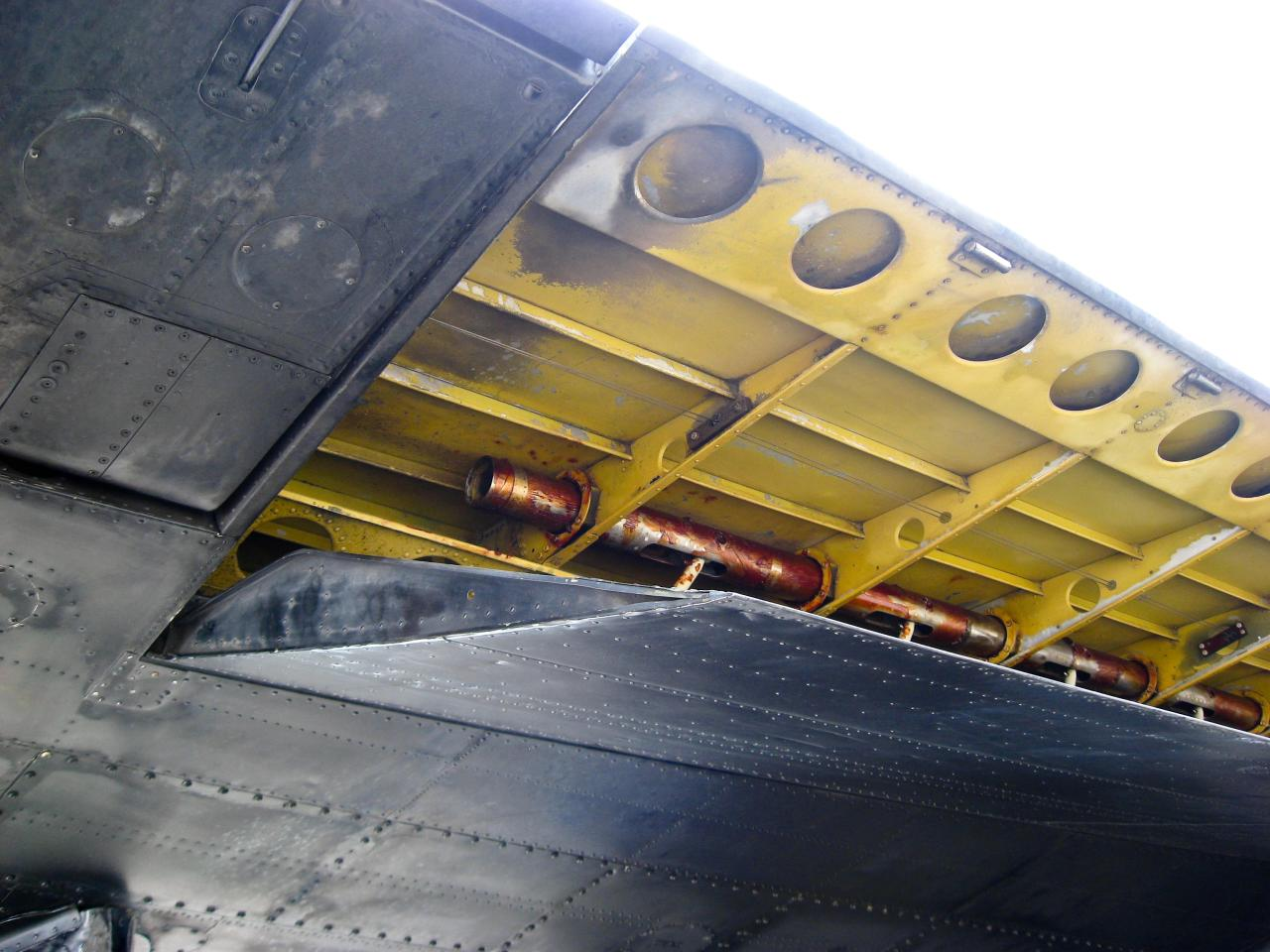
Split flap on a World War II bomber

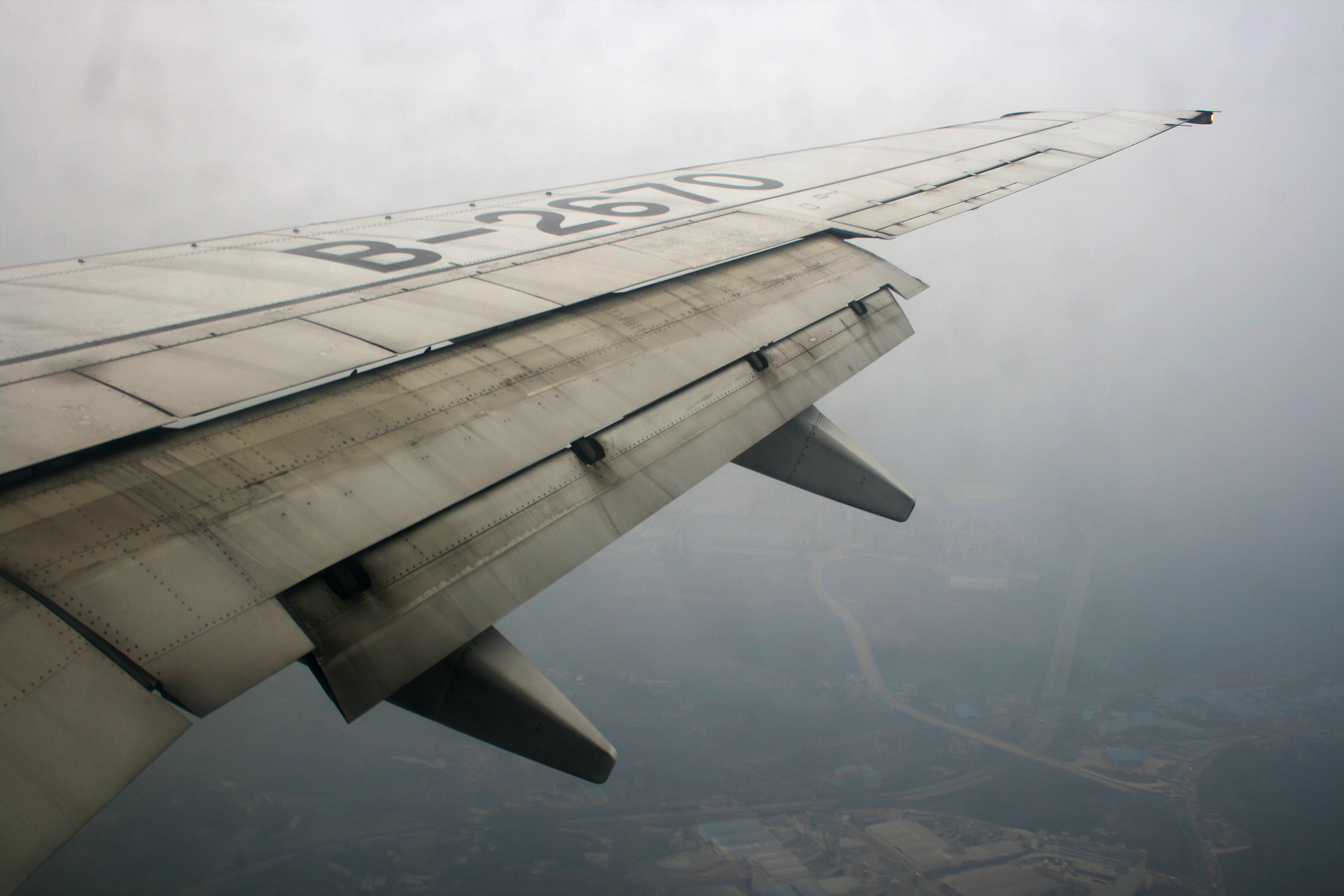
Double slotted Fowler flaps extended for landing

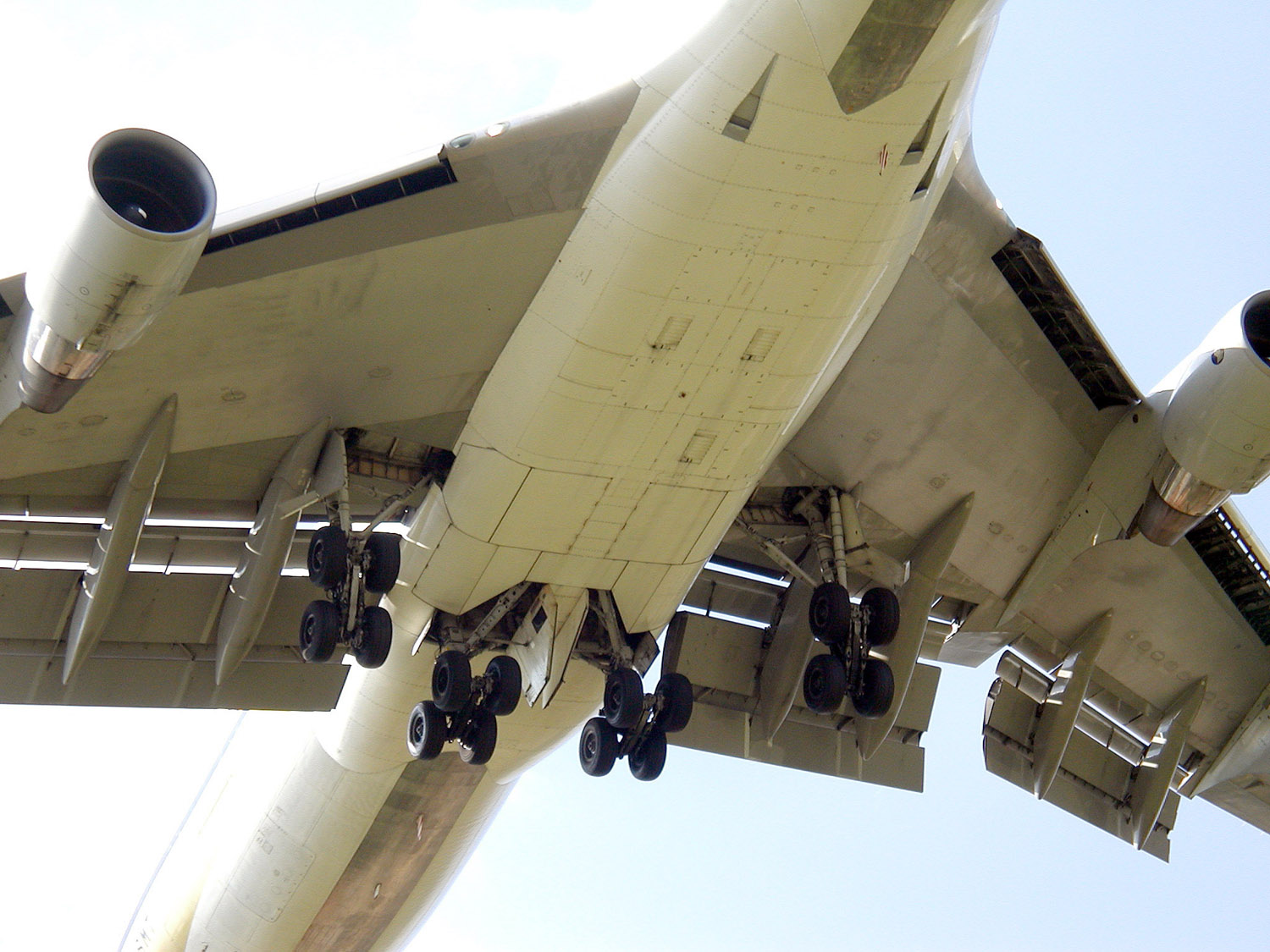
Krueger flaps and triple-slotted trailing-edge flaps of a Boeing 747 extended for landing

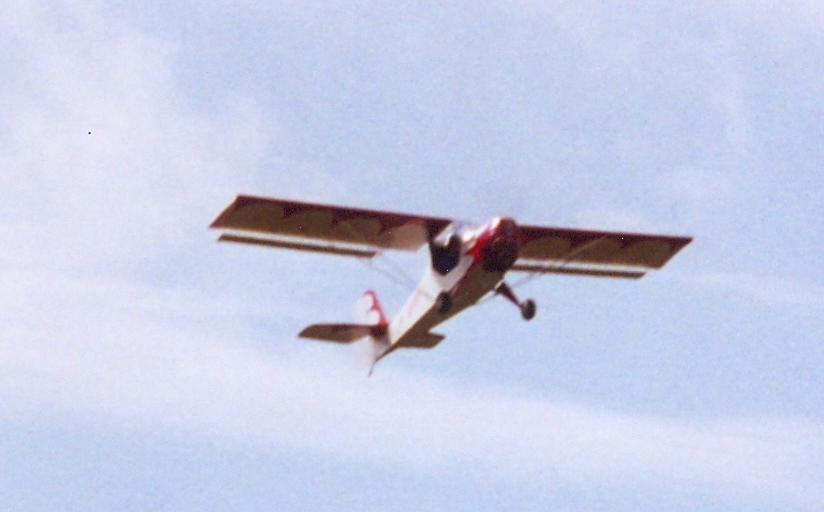
Junkers flaps, doubling as ailerons.

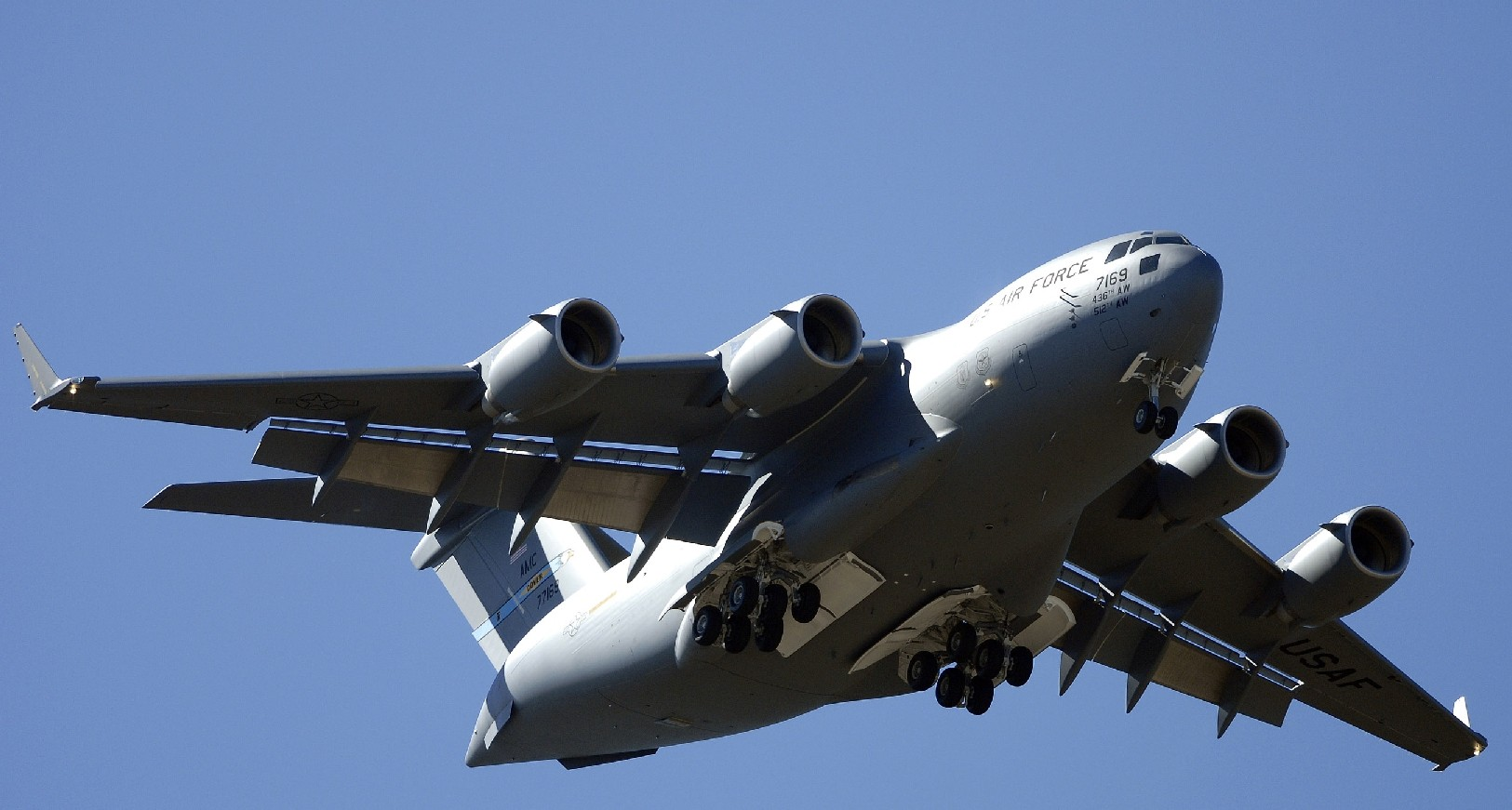
C-17A showing the multiple slotted flaps and slats while flaps are extended at the three quarters position

== See also ==
- Air brake (aeronautics)
- Aircraft flight control system
- Aileron
- Body flaps, a type of high-drag set of aerosurfaces designed for very high angle-of-attack descent of rocket-powered vehicles, particularly used during atmospheric entry of space vehicles. Body flaps are being designed to bleed off as much kinetic and potential energy as possible during a near-vertical descent through the atmosphere.
- Circulation control wing
- High-lift device
- Leading-edge slat
