= Circulation control wing =

Aircraft high-lift device

A circulation control wing (CCW) is a form of high-lift device for use on the main wing of an aircraft to increase the maximum lift coefficient and reduce the stalling speed. CCW technology has been in the research and development phase for over sixty years. Blown flaps were an early example of CCW.

The CCW works by increasing the velocity of the airflow over the leading edge and trailing edge of a specially designed aircraft wing using a series of blowing slots that eject jets of high-pressure air. The wing has a rounded trailing edge to tangentially eject the air through the Coandă effect thus causing lift. The increase in velocity of the airflow over the wing also adds to the lift force through conventional airfoil lift production.

The trailing edge of a CCW showing the blowing slot and tangential coanda airflow.

== Purpose ==
The main purpose of the circulation control wing is to increase the lifting force of an aircraft at times when large lifting forces at low speeds are required, such as takeoff and landing. Wing flaps and slats are currently used during landing on almost all aircraft and on takeoff by larger jets. While flaps and slats are effective in increasing lift, they do so at a high cost of drag. The benefit of the circulation control wing is that no extra drag is created and the lift coefficient is greatly increased. It is being claimed that such a system could increase the maximum coefficient of lift in the landing configuration of a Boeing 737 by 150% to 250%, thus reducing approach speeds by 35% to 45% and landing distances by 55% to 75%; such advances in wing design could allow for a dramatic reduction in the size of the wing of a large jet airplane.

== Other uses ==
=== Increased maneuverability ===
At low speeds, an aircraft has reduced airflow over the wing and vertical stabilizer. This causes the control surfaces (ailerons, elevators and rudder) to be less effective. The CCW system increases the airflow over these surfaces and consequently can allow much higher maneuverability at low speeds. However, if one of the CCW systems should fail at low speed, the affected wing is likely to stall which could result in an inescapable spin. Finally, the CCW system could be used on multi-engine aircraft in the result of an engine failure to cancel the asymmetric forces from the loss of power on one wing.

=== Noise reduction ===
The use of a CCW system eliminates the need for large complex components in the free stream such as flaps and slats, greatly reducing the noise pollution of modern aircraft. Additionally, a much shorter ground roll coupled with steeper climb outs and approaches reduces the ground noise footprint. The blowing slots themselves will contribute very little to the noise of the aircraft as each slot is just a fraction of an inch wide.

== Powering the wing ==
The main problem with the circulation control wing is the need for high energy air to be blown over the wing's surface. Such air is often bled from the engine; however, this drastically reduces engine power production and consequently counteracts the purpose of the wing. Other options are taking the exhaust gases (which must first be cooled) or using multiple, lightweight gas generators, which are separate from the main aircraft engines.

== See also ==
- Aerodynamics
- Airfoil
- Lift (force)
- Flap (aircraft)
- High-lift device
