= Nils Christensen (aviator) =

Norwegian-Canadian aviator and aircraft engineer

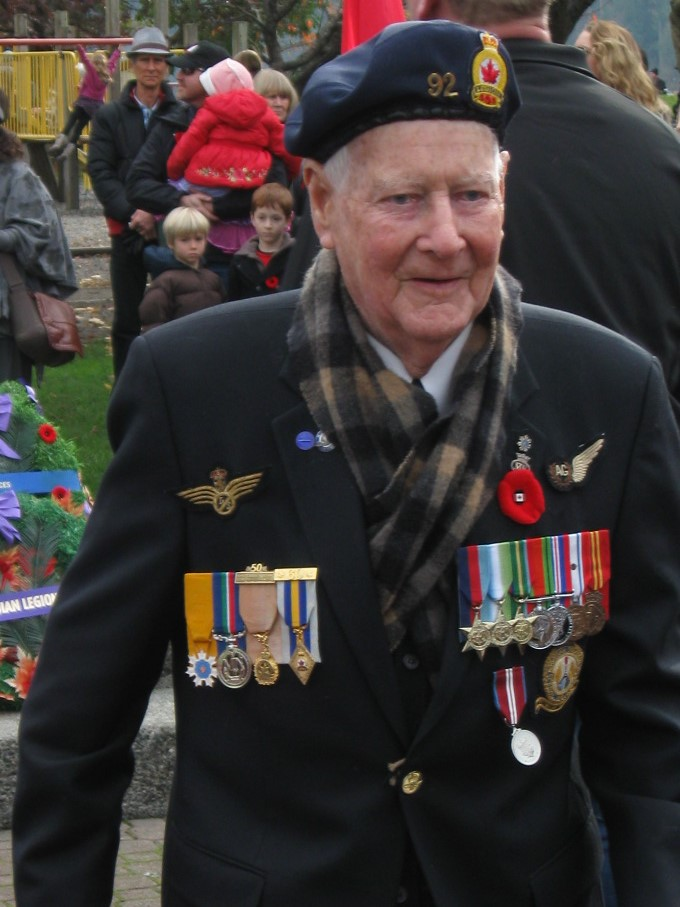
- Nils Christensen (aged 95)
- Born: August 15, 1921; Høvik, Bærum, Norway
- Died: August 6, 2017 (aged 95); Abbotsford, British Columbia, Canada
- Occupations: Aviator, aircraft engineer, entrepreneur, WWII air force veteran.
- Known for: Founder of Viking Air Ltd.

Nils Christensen (15 August 1921 – 6 August 2017) was a Norwegian-Canadian aviator and aircraft engineer who founded the Canadian aerospace manufacturing firm, Viking Air Ltd. He was also a WWII veteran, serving with the Norwegian Merchant Navy and the Royal Norwegian Air Force. He received numerous awards and honours in Canada and Norway for his aviation and military accomplishments.

Christensen immigrated to Canada in 1951, and in 1970 founded Viking Air Ltd. in Sidney, British Columbia, Canada. Initially doing aircraft maintenance and repair, Viking Air developed into a world-class aerospace manufacturing company that continues to build aircraft. He was instrumental in obtaining the sole parts manufacturing rights from de Havilland Canada for the Beaver, Otter, and Turbo Beaver aircraft. This, along with manufacturing components for Boeing, Bell Helicopter, Textron, Lockheed Martin and Bombardier Aerospace, elevated Viking Air to the position of a leader in the Canadian aerospace manufacturing sector.

== Early life ==
Nils Christensen was born on 15 August 1921 near Oslo in Høvik, Bærum, Norway, the fifth of six children of Emil and Jonette (Jansen) Christensen. His father, Emil, emigrated to North Dakota, USA as a young man, working various jobs and homesteading on his own land. He returned to Norway after about 10 years, when he married Jonette and they raised their family. Emil worked as an insurance collector. In 1926, when Nils was five years old, he recalled standing outside his house with his family and staring at the sky while an enormous airship glided silently overhead. This was such an amazing sight that he said the memory stayed with him all his life. He later found out what they witnessed was the Norge (airship) on an exploration trip to the North Pole. Nils attended primary school starting in 1928 at Høvik School (Bærum) from grade one to seven. He then began training as a mechanic apprentice at the age of 15 while attending trade school. When he was 18, he joined the Norwegian Merchant Navy in October, 1939, signing a six-month contract with Wilhelmsen Shipping Co. aboard the newly launched M/S Torrens.

== World War Two ==
=== Norwegian Merchant Navy ===
Christensen's first voyage was on the route between New York, USA and the Far East. They first sailed to Lisbon, Portugal, then across the Atlantic Ocean, through the Panama Canal, and up to California. They then sailed across the Pacific Ocean to Japan, China, the Philippines, back to China, Japan, across the Pacific, through the Panama Canal again, and up to New York City.

World War II had started prior to Christensen signing on with the Merchant navy, on 1 September 1939 when Hitler invaded Poland. On 9 April 1940, the German occupation of Norway began after Nazi forces invaded Norway, which was a neutral country at the time. Christensen's ship was in dry dock in New York on this day, when he and his crew mates learned that Norway had entered the war. As a result of the war, the Norwegian merchant marine companies were taken over by the Norwegian government, now in exile in London They were operated by the Norwegian Shipping and Trade Mission (Nortraship), who instructed the fleet to start shipping supplies to the Allied forces. Christensen would not go home for six years.

When he signed on in 1939, Norway’s population was barely three million people but the country had the fourth largest merchant marine force worldwide. With a thousand, modern vessels, the Norwegians could haul more cargo than most any other country. Due to their importance to the Allies, the civilian fleet ships were in constant danger from German attack and the risk to the Norwegian sailors was great. Around ten percent of the 34,000 men and women who served in the Norwegian Merchant Fleet during the Second World War lost their lives. The ships were destroyed by U-boats, mines and the Luftwaffe. Christensen's time with the Merchant fleet included all the dangers of war but only accorded civilian status. The ship's crew often had to live on severely limited rations. When docked, they had to live in absolute silence, not permitted to talk or listen to the radio at night, to avoid attracting German attention.

Christensen had served on the M/S Torrens for almost 16 months when his tour was completed on 4 February 1941. He left the ship in New York, USA. After a month or so, he signed on with another ship, the Caretta out of Panama, which he sailed with for about one year.

When Pearl Harbor was attacked on 7 December 1941, Christensen's ship was on-route to Panama with a cargo of oil. His captain was ordered to scuttle the ship if it was attacked by the Japanese. In early 1942, Christensen's sister ship was torpedoed and everyone on board was killed.

The Norwegian merchant fleet's effort during World War II was considered one of the most important Norwegian contributions to the Allied victory, which included shipping 40 per cent of the oil to the Allies in Europe, needed to fuel their airplanes and other machinery. After the war was over, British politician Sir Philip Noel Baker stated, "Without the Norwegian Merchant Fleet, Britain and the Allies would have lost the war".

=== Royal Norwegian Air Force ===
In April 1942, at the age of 21, Christensen left the Merchant Fleet and enlisted in the Royal Norwegian Air Force (in exile) in New York City, USA. He was trained as an aircraft mechanic at Little Norway, the Norwegian Army Air Service and Royal Norwegian Air Force training camp in Ontario, Canada.

On completion of his training in the spring of 1943, he was posted to the No. 333 (Norwegian) Squadron RAF, a maritime patrol and special duties squadron. Stationed at the Royal Air Force (RAF) base at Leuchars, Fife, Scotland, under control of the RAF Coastal Command, Christensen acted initially as an aircraft mechanic for Mosquito aircraft. The Mosquitoes did surveillance flights and reported to Coastal Command, then the RAF dispatched aircraft with depth chargers and bombs to respond to enemy intruders. In 1944, Christensen completed air gunnery school and operational training in Morpeth, Northumberland, England. He then flew on Catalinas with the squadron, as a flight mechanic and air gunner, on convoy duty and submarine patrols with the Coastal Command.

On 8 May 1945, Nils and other select members of No. 333 Squadron were chosen to fly a Catalina, and members of No. 330 Squadron to fly a Sunderland, from Scotland to Oslo, Norway to bring the Allied Peace Commission to German-occupied Norway to accept the surrender of the German forces. They were the first two Norwegian airplanes to fly into Norway since the occupation began. It was also the first time Christensen had seen his homeland in over five years.

After the liberation of Norway, Christensen was assigned to help with the rebuilding of the base at Fornebu in Oslo, bringing in planes and supplies. While he was there, he was chosen to crew on one of the aircraft that for two weeks flew Crown Prince Olav (later Olav V of Norway) around Norway, with his entourage and the press, to view the devastation left by war, and the German scorched earth policy of burning every building that could offer shelter, that had left much of the country in ruin.

While Christensen was in the Air Force, he learned that one of his commanding officers, Hjalmar Riiser-Larsen, had been on board the Norge airship in 1926, the day that five year-old Nils saw it flying over his home in Norway.

== Post-War Aviation Career ==
After the war, Christensen agreed to stay on with the Royal Norwegian Air Force for another year. In 1946, he attended Engine Instructors' School in England, then he instructed on engines and aircraft for the Royal Norwegian Air Force. In October 1947, he left the Air Force, and soon after obtained his Norwegian Aircraft Mechanic's license.

He began civilian work as a flight engineer and a station engineer for Braathens South-American & Far East (SAFE) Airtransport, a Norwegian air transport company, flying and maintaining Douglas DC-3 and DC-4 aircraft. He was transferred to Amsterdam, Holland by Braathens. In 1951, Braathens SAFE moved their maintenance base back to Norway, prompting Christensen and his wife to seek other options.

=== Emigration to Canada ===
In 1951, Christensen and his family moved to Toronto, Ontario, Canada, where he used the aircraft service and maintenance skills he had gained during the war and in Holland. He first worked for de Havilland Canada aircraft manufacturer doing Lancaster conversions for air-sea rescue. A year later, he was hired by Keith Messenger of Sault Airways, a bush plane operation in Sault Ste Marie, Ontario, as Chief of Maintenance, servicing float and ski aircraft including Norseman and Cessna. At times, if an airplane crashed, Christensen and the other mechanics would fly out with parts and tools, and repair the plane on site so it could be flown home. During his time at Sault Airways, he earned his Canadian Aircraft Maintenance Engineer (AME) license.

In 1956, the Christensens moved to Sidney, British Columbia, Canada. There, he became Chief of Maintenance at the Victoria Flying Club, where he serviced club aircraft, as well as the Harvards and Beach 18's of the Naval Air Reserve squadron.

=== Martin Mars Flying Tankers ===
In Summer 1959, Christensen joined Forest Industries Flying Tankers (FIFT), as a flight engineer and superintendent of maintenance on the giant Martin JRM Mars water bombers.

The Martin Mars aircraft was initially developed for the US Navy in WWII as a cargo transport seaplane, and was the largest Allied flying boat to enter production. Only seven were built, and three were lost by 1950. The remaining four of the world's only fleet of mighty Martin Mars aircraft were purchased from the US Navy by FIFT in December 1959. Christensen obtained his Flight Engineer License in January 1960, and then began working with Fairey Aviation converting the Mars to firefighting water bombers, which were then operated out of Sproat Lake, Vancouver Island, BC . When the first two water bombers were completed, Christensen flew each mission as Flight Engineer.

On 23 June 1961, Christensen was asked to sit out of the firefighting mission to allow the new Flight Engineer to go. Tragically, the plane crashed killing all four crew members. Then in 1962, the other completed plane was destroyed by high winds from Typhoon Freda while anchored at the Victoria Airport. The conversion of the remaining two Mars aircraft was completed in 1963, and they continued firefighting for about the next 50 years, operated by FIFT and then in 2007 by Coulson Flying Tankers. As of 2016, the planes were retired, primarily due to the use of newer and more versatile aircraft, and were put up for sale.

In 1965, Christensen left FIFT and joined Fairey Aviation, servicing a variety of aircraft. Two years later, in 1967, he became foreman of McKinnon Enterprises, an aircraft parts and modification facility in Sidney. During his time there, Christensen was responsible for rebuilding and converting three amphibian Grumman Goose aircraft to turbine power, and upgrading four Grumman Widgeons.

== Viking Air Ltd. ==
When McKinnon Enterprises closed in Fall 1970, Christensen bought all the equipment from McKinnon and started his own company, Viking Air Ltd., located in a wartime air force hangar at the Victoria International Airport. His new company focused on overhaul, maintenance and conversions of various small aircraft. They specialized in flying boats including the Goose, Widgeon, Mallard and Albatross, getting work from all over North America. Christensen had such extensive knowledge and experience with the elegant Grumman Goose, he developed a reputation in the vintage aircraft field that earned him the name "Goose Doctor". In 1970, he had two men on the floor and his wife in the office. By 1979, he had 25 people in the main shop, and six in Viking Shell, a fuel dealership and pilot’s lounge.

In 1970, Christensen also bought Victoria Flying Services and its 11 aircraft, and in 1971, Viking Air donated a Vickers Viscount aircraft to the Canadian Forces Fire Service for training purposes.

In 1983, Viking Air moved into manufacturing. After 10 years of negotiations by Christensen with de Havilland Canada, they selected Viking Air as their sole parts producer and distributor for Beaver and Otter aircraft. Viking Air supplied aircraft components to the World Health Organization (destined for Africa), and United Kingdom's Royal Air Force (destined for Argentina related to the Falkland Islands war), as well as shipping parts to New Zealand and the USA.

=== Retirement ===
Christensen sold Viking Air Ltd. and retired as President in 1987. Viking Air had grown from three employees when it opened, to 50 at the time of Christensen's retirement 17 years later.

His legacy continued, as in 2005 the company acquired Type Certificates for all of the out-of-production de Havilland heritage aircraft: Chipmunk, Beaver, Otter, Caribou, Buffalo, Twin Otter and Dash. In 2007, Viking announced plans to bring the Twin Otter back into production, and in 2010 delivered the first Viking Series 400 Twin Otter. Viking also converts Beavers to turbo power. By 2012, Viking Air had expanded to over 600 employees, 450 at its headquarters in Sidney, BC and 200 in Calgary, Alberta. The company remains in business, for 47 years at the time of Christensen's death.

After retirement, Christensen maintained a current AME (Aircraft Maintenance Engineer) license, and continued to provide assistance and advice in response to requests he received from around the world. In 45 years of active service, Christensen earned a stellar reputation for his knowledge and skills, not only in service and maintenance, but in converting and rebuilding several types of aircraft when he was called upon for assistance in recovering aircraft from difficult situations and in getting them put back in the air.

== Honours ==
After his retirement, Christensen received numerous awards for his excellence in and contributions to aircraft service and maintenance, as well as honors for his contributions during World War II.

=== Canadian Honours (Aviation) ===
1997 Robert Hope Pursuit of Excellence Award, from the Pacific Aircraft Maintenance Engineers Association.

2003, was one (of the three) first members inducted into the Canadian Federation of Aircraft Maintenance Engineers Hall of Fame.

June 14, 2012, was inducted into Canada's Aviation Hall of Fame at a ceremony in Montreal, Canada. The citation for Christensen’s induction reads: “Following service in the Norwegian merchant navy and the air force, Nils Christensen developed a reputation for his vast knowledge and skill in aircraft service and maintenance. As the founder of Viking Air Ltd., his legacy has continued the work of de Havilland Canada in contributing to the Canadian aviation industry."

February, 2012, was made an "Honorary Citizen" of the city of Wetaskiwin, Alberta where the Canada's Aviation Hall of Fame is based.

July 2012, was inducted into the BC Aviation Hall of Fame through the British Columbia Aviation Museum Society in Sidney, BC, which included Honorary Lifetime Membership to the Museum.

Note: Christensen previously participated in the donation of a Norseman bush plane to the BC Aviation Museum. The picture of the plane is featured on the museum logo. The museum is located on the grounds of the Victoria International Airport on "Norseman Road".

2012, received the Queen Elizabeth II Diamond Jubilee Medal for Canada, presented by The Right Honorable David Johnston, Governor General of Canada. The Medal was awarded to those having made an honorable service in military, police, prison, and emergency forces, or for outstanding achievement or public service.

=== Norwegian Honors (Military) ===
November 2011, was invited as a guest of the Norwegian government, as one of 240 Norwegian Merchant Marine veterans, to attend the re-christening of the restored merchant ship, D/S Hestmanden as a national wartime seafarers’ museum, in Kristiansand, Norway. King Harald V, son of King Olav V, was present and greeted each veteran personally.

June 14, 2012, at the induction ceremony for the Canada's Aviation Hall of Fame in Montreal, he was given a reproduction painting by Canadian aviation artist, Charles Kadin, depicting Royal Norwegian Air Force training aircraft over Toronto's Little Norway airport. The original painting hangs in the Military Aviation Museum in Norway. He was presented with the print by Minister Counselor Tobias Svenningsen of the Royal Norwegian Embassy in Ottawa.

June 20, 2012, he returned to Norway to the Andoya Air Station where the No. 333 Squadron of the Royal Norwegian Air Force is based, on the invitation of the Norwegian military, to participate in the 100th anniversary of Norwegian military aviation, and the 70th anniversary of the 333 Squadron.

== Personal ==
In 1946, Christensen met his future wife, Sheila Wolfenden, in England while he was attending Engine Instructors' School and she worked in the British Air Ministry. Sheila's father was Wing Commander William Wolfenden, OBE, who served with the Royal Air Force during the First and Second World Wars.

Nils and Sheila were married in Høvik, Norway in 1947. They then moved to Amsterdam, Holland when Nils was transferred there by his employer, Braathens SAFE. Their first two children were born there, a son who died as an infant, and a daughter.

As there was little housing available in Norway and due to rumors of possible aggression from Russia, they emigrated to Canada in 1951, initially to Toronto, Ontario, then Sault Ste Marie, Ontario where their second son was born. Looking for a milder climate, they moved in 1956 to Sidney, British Columbia, where their second daughter was later born. On 28 March 1957, Nils became a Canadian citizen at ceremonies held in Victoria, BC.

Both as a businessman and as a person, Christensen was well-known and well-liked. Never forgetting his comrades in the Merchant Fleet, Christensen had always been highly supportive of the Norwegian Merchant Navy veterans, donating both time and money to their cause. Still active at 90 years of age, Christensen made the trip with his youngest daughter to Kristiansand, Norway in 2011 for the dedication of the D/C Hestmanden. At the luncheon for the event, he was reunited with HM King Harald V, whom he had met in “Little Norway” during the war when the latter was just five years old.

In 1993, Christensen and his wife moved from Sidney to Salt Spring Island, BC where they lived for 24 years. In March 2017, they moved to Abbotsford, BC to be near family. Nils died in Abbotsford on 6 August 2017 at age 95, of congestive heart failure. He and Sheila had been married for 70 years. At the time of his death, he had 3 children, 4 grandchildren, and 4 great-grandchildren. His Celebration of Life in Sidney, BC was attended by Brigadier Tom Guttormsen, Head of Veterans Affairs for Norway; and Norwegian Honorary Consul Steinar Engeset from Halifax, Nova Scotia, Canada, as well as many colleagues and friends.

In October 2018, his ashes were interred near his hometown in Norway, at the 800 year-old Haslum Church and Cemetery where his ancestors are buried.

As was noted by Minister Counselor Svenningsen during the 2012 CAHF induction ceremony, Mr. Christensen was a true hero of both Norway and Canada, a feat not easily repeated.
