= De Havilland Canada (1928–1986) =

Former Canadian aircraft manufacturer

The de Havilland Aircraft Company of Canada, Limited
- Industry: Aerospace
- Founded: March 5, 1928; 98 years ago
- Defunct: 1986 (as an independent company)
- Fate: Acquired by Boeing
- Successor: Boeing Canada (Legal continuation of DHC); Bombardier Inc. (Legal successor of de Havilland Inc.); De Havilland Canada (Brand revived in 2018)
- Headquarters: Ontario, Canada
- Products: Military and civil aircraft
- Parent: de Havilland (1928–1963); Hawker Siddeley (1963–1974); Government of Canada (1974–1986); Boeing (1986–1992); Bombardier Inc. (1992–1998)

The de Havilland Aircraft Company of Canada, Limited (DHC) was an aircraft manufacturer with facilities based in what is now the Downsview area of Toronto, Ontario, Canada. The original location of de Havilland Canada later became the site of the Canadian Air and Space Museum located in what is now Downsview Park.

The aircraft company was established in 1928 by the British de Havilland Aircraft Company to build Moth aircraft for the training of Canadian airmen, and subsequently after the Second World War, designed and produced indigenous designs.

In the 1980s, the Government of Canada privatized DHC and in 1986 sold the aircraft company to then Seattle-based Boeing, which renamed the company to Boeing of Canada Ltd., marking the end of DHC as an independent aircraft manufacturer. The company was put up for sale in 1988 and was eventually acquired by Montreal-based Bombardier Aerospace in 1992, where it continued to exist as the newly formed de Havilland Inc. until 1998.

In 2006, Viking Air of Victoria, British Columbia purchased the type certificates for all the original out-of-production de Havilland designs (DHC-1 to DHC-7), and in November 2018, Viking Air's holding company, Longview Aviation Capital, announced that it is to acquire the Q400 program, along with the rights to the de Havilland name and trademark. The deal, which closed in June 2019, brought the entire de Havilland product line under the same banner for the first time in decades under the new De Havilland Aircraft of Canada Limited.

== History ==
=== Establishment ===
The de Havilland Aircraft Company of Canada, Limited was first established on March 5, 1928 as a subsidiary of de Havilland Aircraft (UK) located at De Lesseps Field in Toronto. The company was reincorporated on March 5, 1929 and moved to Downsview that same year.

=== Pre-Second World War ===
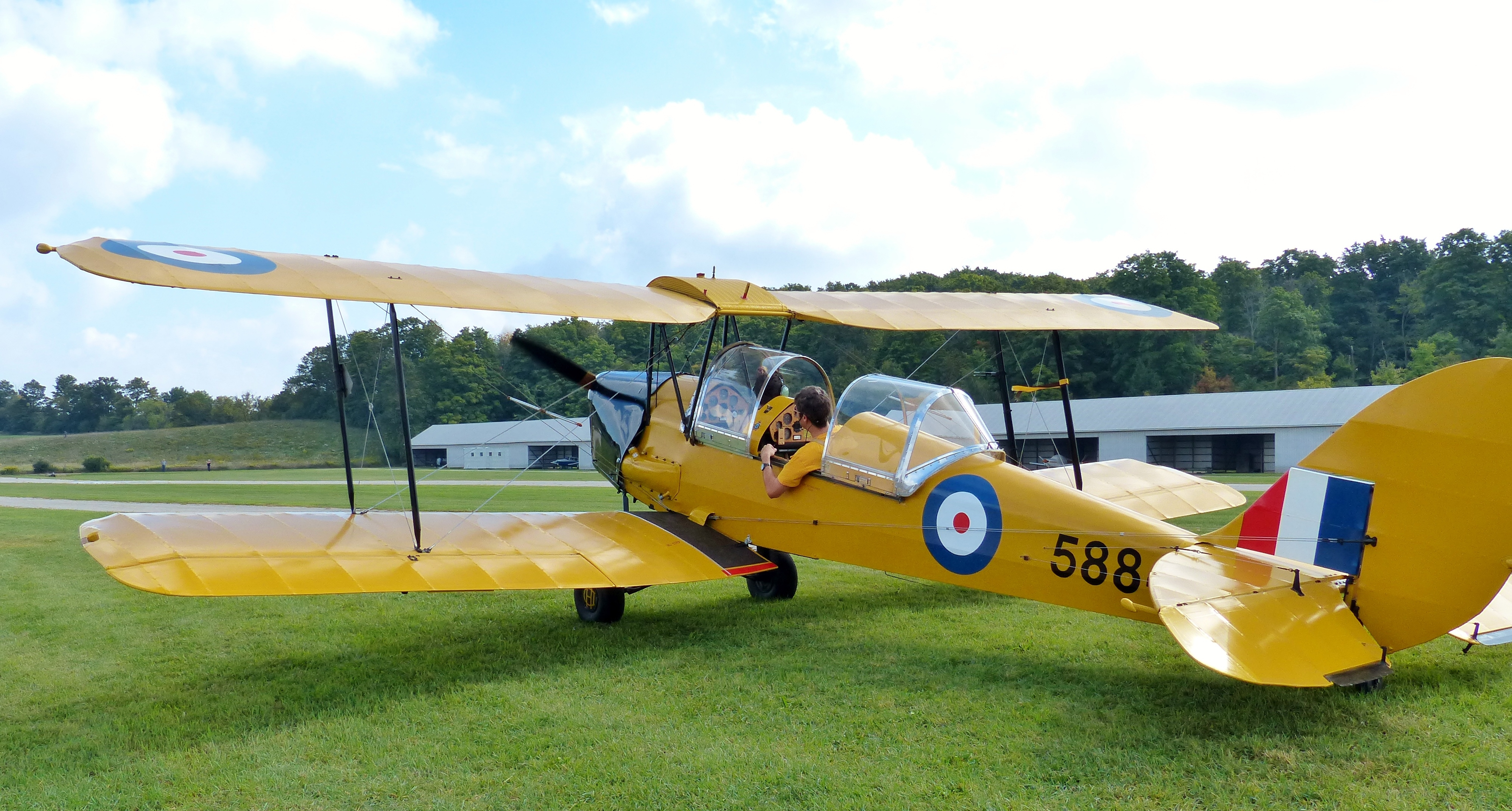
RCAF DH.82C Tiger Moth, 1941

Flown for the first time on 26 October 1931, the DH.82 Tiger Moth was derived from the DH.60 Moth. The DH 82 was powered by a 120 hp Gipsy II engine, but the 1939 DH.82a received the 145 hp Gipsy Major. More than 1,000 Tiger Moths were delivered before the Second World War, and subsequently 4,005 were built in the UK and shipped all over the world. 1,747 were built in Canada (the majority being the DH.82c model with enclosed cockpits, brakes, tail wheels, etc.). The follow-up DH.83 Fox Moth was designed in England in 1932 as a light, economic transport and was built using as many Tiger Moth components as possible.

=== Second World War ===
The de Havilland Tiger Moth was a basic trainer of the British Commonwealth Air Training Plan (BCATP) during the Second World War, whereby air crews from all over the British Commonwealth trained in Canada. DHC was the Canada unit of the parent British de Havilland and during World War II was made into a crown corporation of the Government of Canada.

Production of the Mosquito, nicknamed the "Mossie," was the company's greatest contribution to the war effort. It was one of the few front-line aircraft of the era constructed almost entirely of wood and was nicknamed "The Wooden Wonder". The Mosquito was designed to use speed instead of defensive armament to evade attack, and as a result it was one of the fastest aircraft in the war, reaching 425 mph at 30,000 ft. The original design was intended as a light bomber, but soon proved itself in high-level photography and every phase of intruder operations.

Out of the more than 7,000 Mosquitoes produced overall by de Havilland, de Havilland Canada produced 1,134. Some 500 were delivered to the UK by the end of the war, although several were lost en route across the Atlantic.

=== Post-Second World War ===
After the war, de Havilland Canada began to build its own designs uniquely suited to the harsh Canadian operating environment. The company also continued production of several British de Havilland aircraft and later produced a licence-built version of the American-designed Grumman S2F Tracker. During this time, the company designed eight aircraft types:

- DHC-1 Chipmunk
- DHC-2 Beaver
- DHC-3 Otter
- DHC-4 Caribou
- DHC-5 Buffalo
- DHC-6 Twin Otter
- DHC-7 Dash 7
- DHC-8 Dash 8

In 1962 the Avro Canada aircraft production facility was transferred to de Havilland Canada by their then-merged parent company, UK-based Hawker Siddeley. The company also built HMCS Bras d'Or (FHE 400) hydrofoil and parts for the Alouette 1 satellite.

=== Privatization ===
In the 1980s, the Government of Canada privatized DHC and in 1986 sold the aircraft company to then Seattle-based Boeing. The government claimed to have guarantees from Boeing not to discontinue any product lines, but shortly thereafter, Boeing discontinued both the successful Twin Otter and the Dash 7. The jigs and specialised equipment for their manufacture were destroyed.

Boeing was in heavy competition with Airbus Industrie for a series of new airliners for Air Canada, at that time a Canadian Crown corporation. Boeing used the DHC purchase to further strengthen their commitment to their shared production contracts. The contract was particularly contentious. When Air Canada announced that Airbus had won the contract in 1988, amid claims of bribery, Boeing immediately put DHC up for sale, placing the company in jeopardy.

During its time under Boeing the company, the company was renamed Boeing of Canada Ltd. in March 1986, de Havilland Canada Ltd. in November 1987, and Boeing Canada Technology Ltd. in October 1988.

=== Sale to Bombardier ===
DHC was eventually sold in 1992. The DHC unit was transferred to a new legal entity, de Havilland Inc., and sold to Bombardier Aerospace and the Government of Ontario with a 51% and 49% stake respectively. Bombardier also had the option to buy the Government of Ontario's stake after 4 years. Legally, the original company was retained by Boeing and was eventually succeeded by Boeing Canada in 2005.

In 1997, Bombardier acquired the 49% stake owned by the Government of Ontario, and in 1998, the new de Havilland Inc. was amalgamated into Bombardier, marking the end of DHC as an independent company. Despite this, the Dash-8 remained in production by Bombardier with a particular emphasis being placed on its quiet operation in comparison to other aircraft of a similar size. This product line was expanded to four models, and the largest is labelled Q-400.

=== Purchase by Viking Air ===
On 24 February 2006, Viking Air of Victoria purchased the type certificates from Bombardier Aerospace for all the original de Havilland designs from the DHC-1 Chipmunk to the DHC-7 Dash 7. The ownership of the certificates gives Viking the exclusive right to manufacture new aircraft; previously, Viking had purchased in May 2005 the right to manufacture spares and distribute de Havilland heritage aircraft product line.

De Havilland Canada has manufactured many original aircraft designs, and its products are still flying in considerable numbers worldwide. This legacy has helped it to become a productive member of the Bombardier Aerospace stable. The Downsview plant still turns out civil propeller aircraft, and the facility maintains thousands of employees.

=== Formation of a New Company ===
In November 2018, Viking Air's parent Longview Aviation Capital Corporation acquired the Dash 8 program and the de Havilland brand from Bombardier, in a deal which closed on 3 June 2019 following regulatory approval. Earlier in January 2019, Longview announced that it would establish a new company in Ontario to continue production of the Q400 model and support the Dash 8 range. Thus, the closing of the deal brought the entire Canadian de Havilland product line under the same banner for the first time since 2006, under a new holding company named De Havilland Aircraft of Canada Limited.

== Aircraft history ==
=== DHC-1 Chipmunk ===
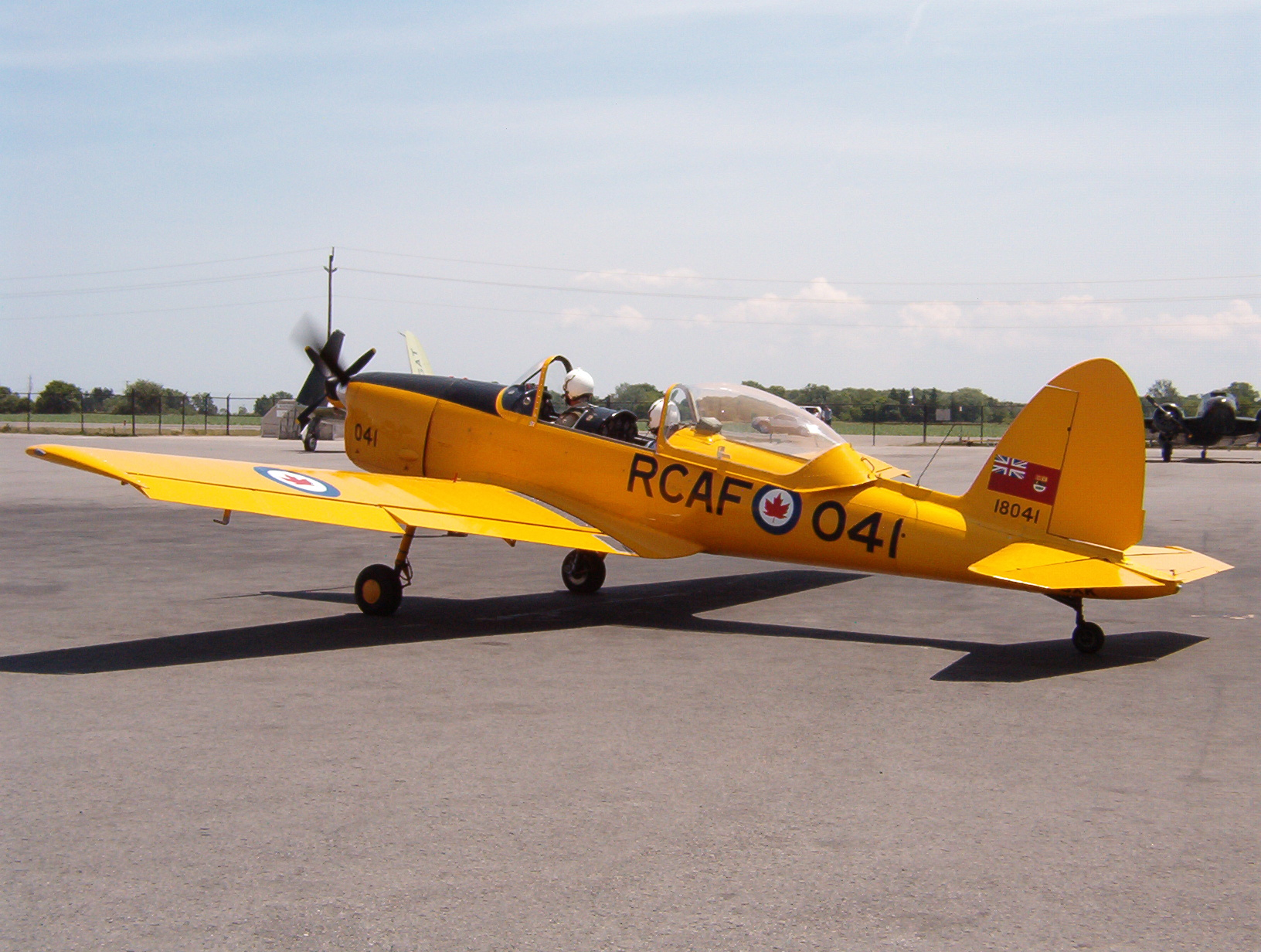
A former RCAF Chipmunk

The first true postwar aviation project was the DHC-1 Chipmunk, designed as a primary trainer, a replacement for the venerable de Havilland Tiger Moth. The Chipmunk was an all-metal, low wing, tandem two-place, single-engine airplane with a conventional tail wheel landing gear. It had fabric-covered control surfaces and a clear plastic canopy covering the pilot and passenger/student positions. The production versions of the airplane were powered by a 145 hp in-line de Havilland Gipsy Major "8" engine.

The Chipmunk prototype first flew on 22 May 1946 in Toronto and had a total production run of 158 Chipmunks for RCAF use while de Havilland (UK) produced 740 airplanes for training at various RAF and University Air Squadrons during the late 1940s and into the 1950s. The DHC-1 Chipmunk was still being used as a training aircraft by the UK's Army Air Corps up until 1995.

At the present, October 2011, the Chipmunk is in service with the RAF Battle of Britain Memorial Flight and RN Historic Flight, it is used to train pilots to fly 'taildraggers' as a pre-requisite to flying the flight's Supermarine Spitfires and Hawker Hurricanes. All of the RAF's modern aircraft have tricycle undercarriage, so pilots are unfamiliar with tail wheel aircraft.

=== DHC-2 Beaver ===
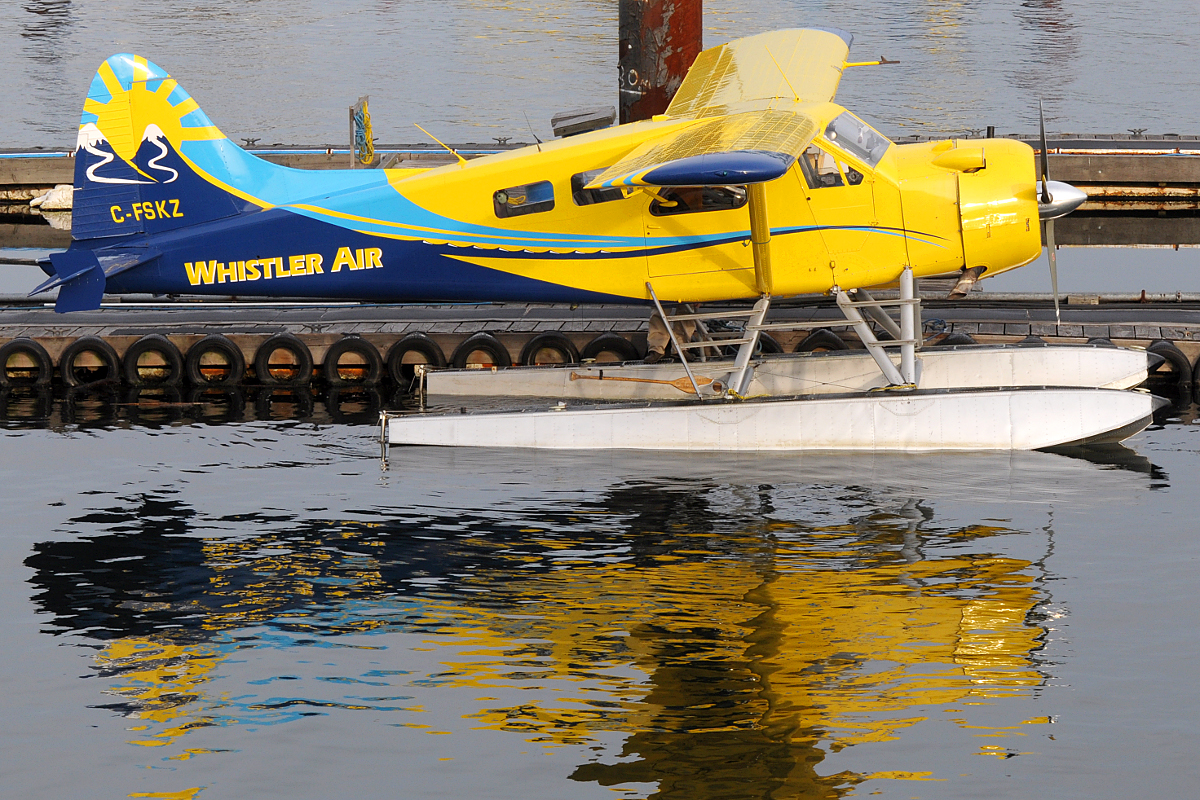
Beaver of Whistler Air

Returning to designing purpose-built aircraft for Canada's north, the DHC-2 Beaver was developed in 1947. After a survey of Canada's bush pilots, including Punch Dickins, the need for a rugged, highly versatile aerial truck which could take off and land almost anywhere, carry a large half-ton load and be very reliable, formed the basis of a new specification. The first of the STOL family that de Havilland would produce, the Beaver would carve a niche into the bush plane market.

In the civilian sector, the Beaver soon excelled on wheels, skis and floats, and in 1951, the Beaver would be selected by the US Air Force and Army as a new liaison aircraft. In the nine years that followed, 968 L-20As were delivered to the armed forces, most going to the Army. They served in both the Korean War and Vietnam Wars, hauling freight and personnel around the battlefields, mapping enemy troop positions, leading search/rescue missions, and relaying radio traffic, among other missions. In 1962, the L-20 was re-designated the U-6A, and many remaining examples remained in service well into the 1970s. Beavers were also purchased and used by the military services of numerous other nations, including Britain, Chile and Colombia.

With almost 1,700 built in a production run lasting two decades, civilian-owned Beavers continue plying their trade in over 50 countries all around the world. A turbine-conversion, the Turbo Beaver (DHC-2 Mk.III) first flew in December 1963. This version featured a Pratt & Whitney PT6A-6 turboprop, which offered lower empty and higher takeoff weights, and even better STOL performance. The Turbo Beaver's cabin was also longer, allowing maximum accommodation for 11, including the pilot. Externally, the Turbo Beaver had a much longer and reprofiled nose, and squared off vertical tail. DHC also offered conversion kits enabling piston-powered Beavers to be upgraded to Turbo standard. Other conversions have been performed by a number of companies including Kenmore Aviation and Viking Air.

=== DHC-3 Otter ===
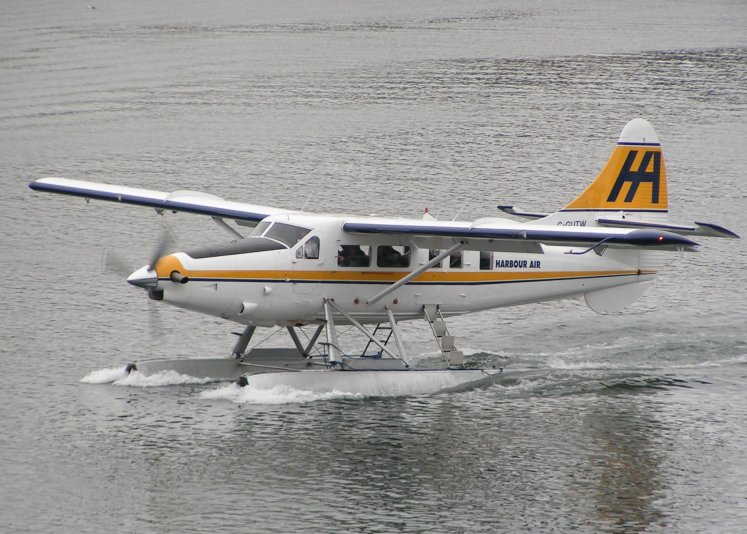
Turbo Otter of Harbour Air

Another in de Havilland Canada's successful line of rugged and useful STOL utility transports, the Otter was conceived to be capable of performing the same roles as the earlier and highly successful Beaver, but was bigger, the veritable "one-ton truck."

Using the same overall configuration of the earlier and highly successful DHC2 Beaver, the Otter is much larger overall. The Otter began life as the King Beaver, but compared to the Beaver is longer, has greater span wings and is much heavier. Seating in the main cabin is for 10 or 11, whereas the Beaver could seat six. Power is supplied by a 450 kW (600 hp) Pratt & Whitney R1340 Wasp radial. Like the Beaver, the Otter can be fitted with skis and floats. The amphibious floatplane Otter features a unique four unit retractable undercarriage, with the wheels retracting into the floats.

Design work at de Havilland Canada began on the DHC3 Otter in January 1951, the company's design efforts culminating in the type's first flight on 12 December 1951. Canadian certification was awarded in November 1952.

After de Havilland Canada demonstrated the Otter to the US Army, subsequently that service went on to become the largest DHC3 operator (as the U1). Other military users included Australia, Canada and India.

Small numbers of Otters were converted to turbine power by Cox Air Services of Alberta, Canada. Changes included a Pratt & Whitney Canada PT6A turboprop, a lower empty weight of 1692 kg (3705 lb) and a higher maximum speed of 267 km/h (144 kt). It was called the Cox Turbo Single Otter. A number of other after market PT6 conversions have also been offered.

The Otter found a significant niche as a bush aircraft and today it remains highly sought after.

=== DHC-4 Caribou ===
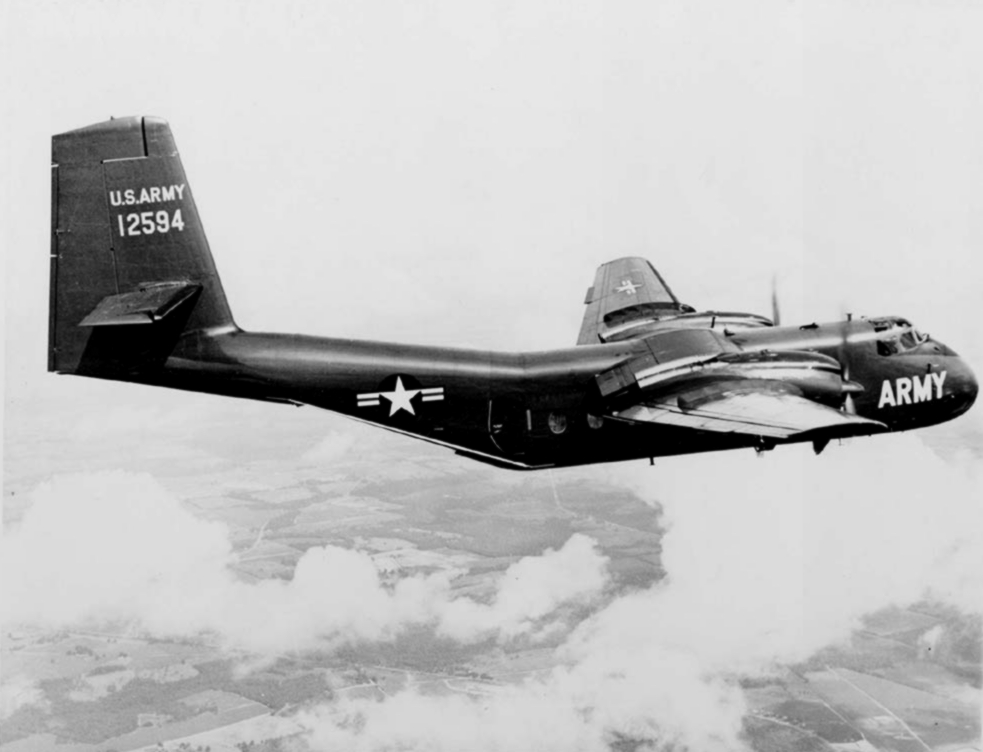
U.S. Army Caribou in flight

de Havilland Canada's fourth design was a big step up in size compared with its earlier products, and was the first powered by two engines, but the DHC-4 Caribou was similar in that it is a rugged STOL utility. The Caribou was primarily a military tactical transport that in commercial service found itself a small niche in cargo hauling.

de Havilland Canada designed the DHC-4 in response to a US Army requirement for a tactical airlifter to supply the battlefront with troops and supplies and evacuate casualties on the return journey. With assistance from Canada's Department of Defence Production, DHC built a prototype demonstrator that flew for the first time on 30 July 1958.

Impressed with the DHC4's STOL capabilities and potential, the US Army ordered five for evaluation as YAC-1s and went on to become the largest Caribou operator, taking delivery of 159. The AC-1 designation was changed in 1962 to CV-2, and then C-7 when the US Army's CV-2s were transferred to the US Air Force in 1967. US and Australian Caribou saw extensive service during the Vietnam War. In addition some US Caribou were captured by North Vietnamese forces and remained in service with that country through to the late 1970s. Other notable military operators included Canada, Malaysia, India and Spain.

The majority of Caribou production was for military operators, but the type's ruggedness and excellent STOL capabilities also appealed to a select group of commercial users. US certification was awarded on 23 December 1960. AnsettMAL, which operated a single example in the New Guinea highlands, and AMOCO Ecuador were early customers, as was Air America (a CIA front in South East Asia during the Vietnam War era for covert operations). Other Caribou entered commercial service after being retired from their military users.

In later years, some civilian Caribou were modified to turboprop standard, with varying successes. Today only a handful of Caribou, in any variant, are in civilian use.

=== DHC-5 Buffalo ===
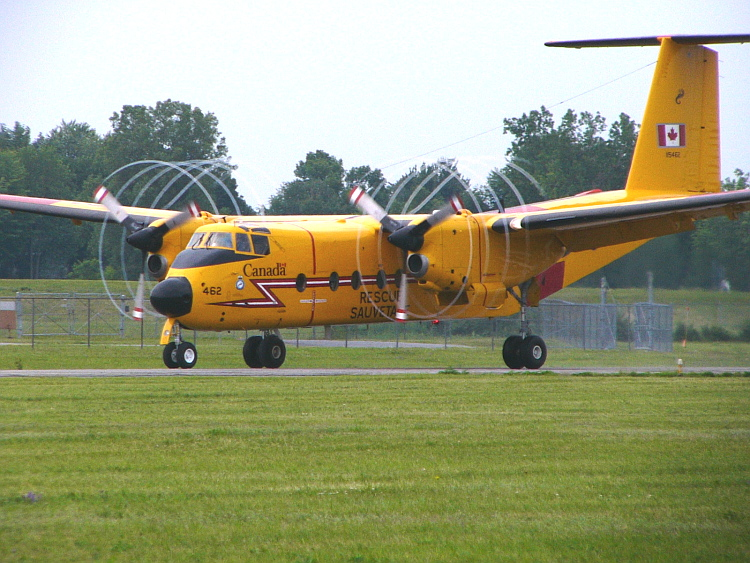
Royal Canadian Air Force CC-115 Buffalo of 442 Squadron

Known originally as the Caribou II, the DHC-5 Buffalo tactical transport was basically an enlarged DHC-4 with turboprop engines and a T-tail. The DHC-5 had been developed to meet the requirements of the US Army for a transport that would be able to carry loads such as the Pershing missile, a 105 mm howitzer or 3/4-ton truck. Development costs were shared by the US Army, Canadian government and de Havilland Canada; the first of these transports made its maiden flight on 9 April 1964.

Hopes for large orders were dashed when the US Army was forced to transfer all heavy fixed-wing aircraft to the US Air Force, which had no interest in the aircraft. 122 were built in two production runs, including a handful of Buffalo aircraft for the US Army and four C-8 transports for the USAF. When no further orders resulted from the US Army evaluation of the DHC-5 (designated originally YAC-2 by the US Army, and later C-8A), the Canadian Armed Forces acquired 15 of the DHC-5A (designated CC-115): six were converted subsequently for deployment in a maritime patrol role.

Following delivery of 24 to the Brazilian Air Force and 16 to the Peruvian Air Force, the production line was closed down. In 1974, the company realised there was a continuing demand for the Buffalo and production of an improved Buffalo (DHC-5D) was initiated. This version had more powerful engines which permitted operation at higher gross weights, and offered improved all-round performance. In the early 1980s, de Havilland Canada attempted to modify the Buffalo for civilian use. The aircraft was to be branded as the "Transporter." After loss of the demonstration aircraft (SN 103 C-GCTC) at the 1984 Farnborough Airshow, the project was abandoned. Production of the Buffalo ended in 1982, but the last of 122 aircraft built was not delivered until April 1985.

=== DHC-6 Twin Otter ===
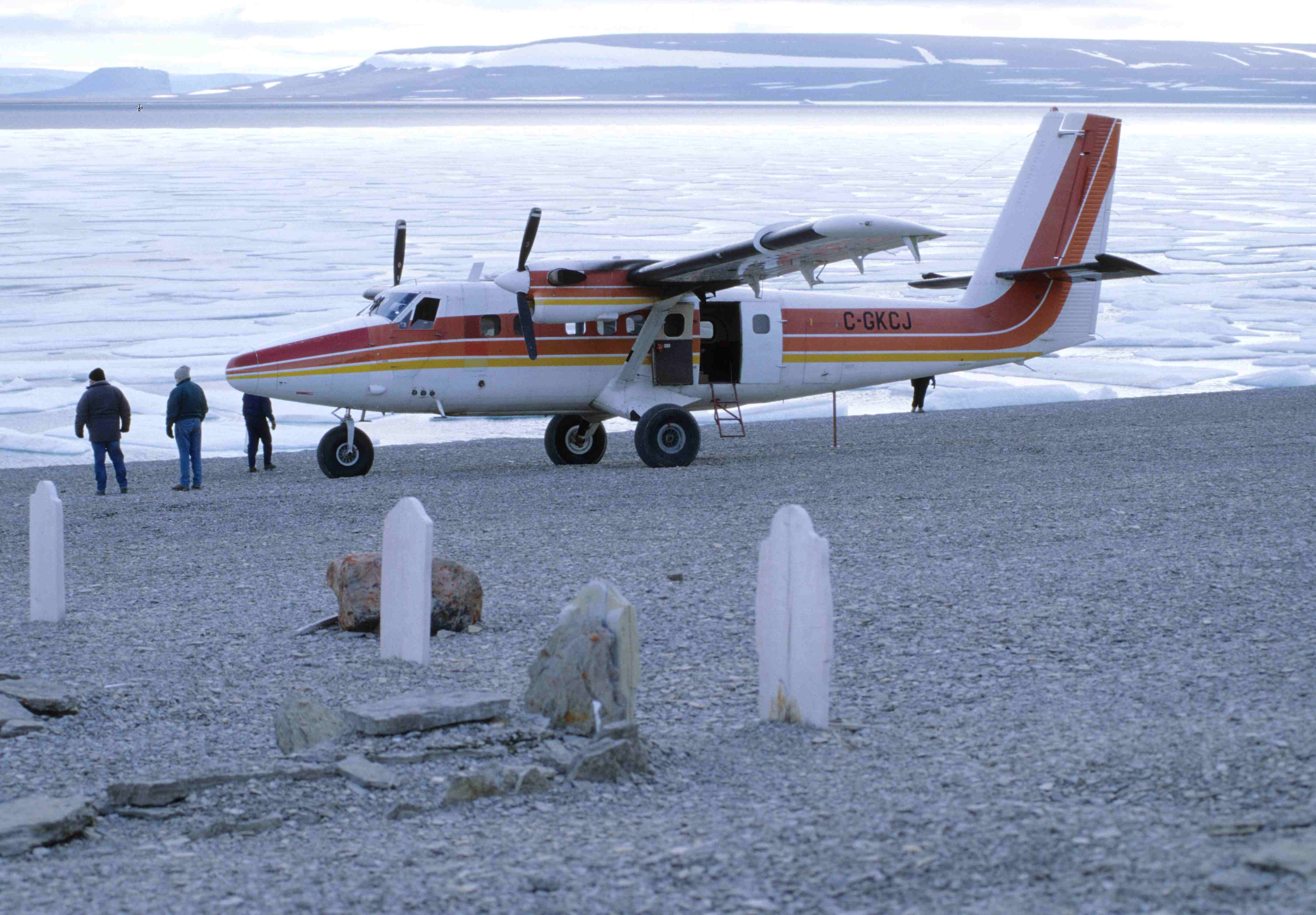
Twin Otter with tundra tires, on Beechey Island, Nunavut, Canada

One of Canada's most successful commercial aircraft designs, with more than 800 built, the Twin Otter remains popular for its rugged construction and useful STOL performance.

Development of the Twin Otter dates back to January 1964, when de Havilland Canada commenced work on a twin turboprop variant of the DHC-3 Otter as a STOL twin turboprop commuter airliner and utility transport. The wings were lengthened, the rear fuselage, tail, and nose were redesigned and seating was increased to as many as 18.

The new aircraft was designated the DHC-6 and prototype construction began in November that year, resulting in the type's first flight on 20 May 1965. After receiving certification in mid-1966, the first Twin Otter entered service with longtime de Havilland Canada supporter, the Ontario Department of Lands and Forests.

The first production aircraft were Series 100s. Design features included double slotted trailing edge flaps and 'flaperons' (ailerons that act in unison with the flaps) to boost STOL performance. Compared with the later Series 200s and 300s, the 100s are distinguishable by their shorter noses, thinner propellers and smaller exhaust ports on the engines.

The main addition to the Series 200, which was introduced in April 1968, was the extended nose, which, together with a reconfigured storage compartment in the rear cabin, greatly increased baggage stowage area.

The Series 300 was introduced from the 231st production aircraft in 1969. It too featured the lengthened nose, but also introduced more powerful engines, thus allowing a 450 kg (1,000 lb) increase in takeoff weight and a 20-seat interior. All models are capable of being fitted with skis and floats. In addition, six 300S enhanced STOL performance DHC-6-300s were built in the mid 1970s.

Production on the Twin Otter ceased in late 1988. In 2010, Viking Air began producing the first all-new Twin Otter, the Series 400.

=== DHC-7 Dash 7 ===
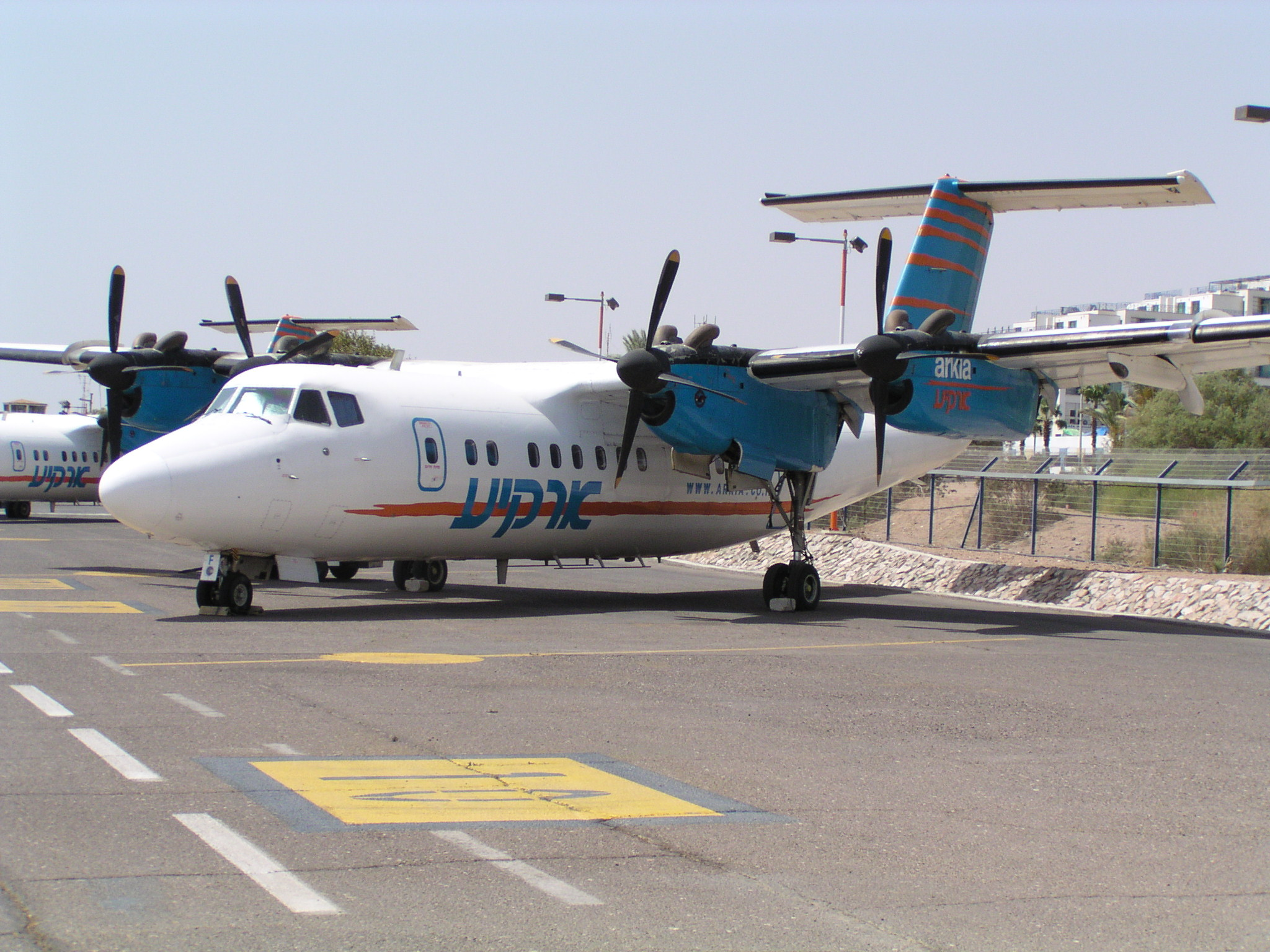
Dash 7 of Arkia Israel Airlines

The four-engine DHC-7, popularly known as the Dash 7, was designed as a STOL (short takeoff and landing) 50-seat regional airliner capable of operating from strips as short as 915 m (3,000 ft) in length. It was meant to serve small city airports like the London City Airport (LCA) where noise requirements were particularly strict, and featured four slow-turning props to cut noise.

In order to allow the Dash 7 to achieve its excellent STOL characteristics the aircraft employs many aerodynamic devices. The wing flaps are double slotted and span approximately 75% of the trailing edge of the wing. In a typical STOL landing flaps will be set to 45° before landing which allows for a slower approach speed (typically 70–85 knots) and steeper descent. Upon touchdown the flaps immediately return to the 25° position which decreases the lift created by the wing thereby increasing braking effectiveness. The aircraft also employs two ground spoilers per wing, and two roll spoilers per wing. The roll spoilers' primary job is to augment the ailerons however upon touchdown all four roll spoilers activate along with all four ground spoilers to spoil much of the lift generated by the wing.

Financial backing from the Canadian Government allowed the launch of the DHC7 program in the early 1970s, resulting in the maiden flight of the first of two development aircraft on 27 March 1975. The first production Dash 7 flew on 3 March 1977, the type was certificated on 2 May 1977 and it entered service with Rocky Mountain Airways on 3 February 1978. The type made the first ever landing at London Docklands Heron's Quay in 1983 paving the way for London City Airport. In 1987 the Dash 7 inaugurated flight service at LCA, with Brymon Airways. The market for the city-to-city aircraft never fully materialized, however London City Airport saw Brymon Airways providing Dash 7 service from 1987, exploiting its excellent STOL capabilities (Note: London City Airport extended its runway to accommodate British Airways, notably the BAe 146, in 1991.)

The standard passenger carrying Dash 7 is the Series 100, while the type was also offered in pure freighter form as the Series 101. Maximum take-off weight was 42,000 lbs. Followed shortly after by the Series 102 (passenger variant) and the Series 103 (a combination passenger/freighter variant) which had more powerful engines. Maximum take-of weight was increased to 44,000 lbs. The only major development of the Dash 7 was the Series 150, which featured a higher maximum takeoff weight and greater fuel capacity, boosting range. The Series 151 was the equivalent freighter. The maximum take-off weight was 47,000 lbs. Production of the Dash 7 ended in 1988, following Boeing's takeover of de Havilland Canada.

=== de Havilland Canada Dash 8 ===
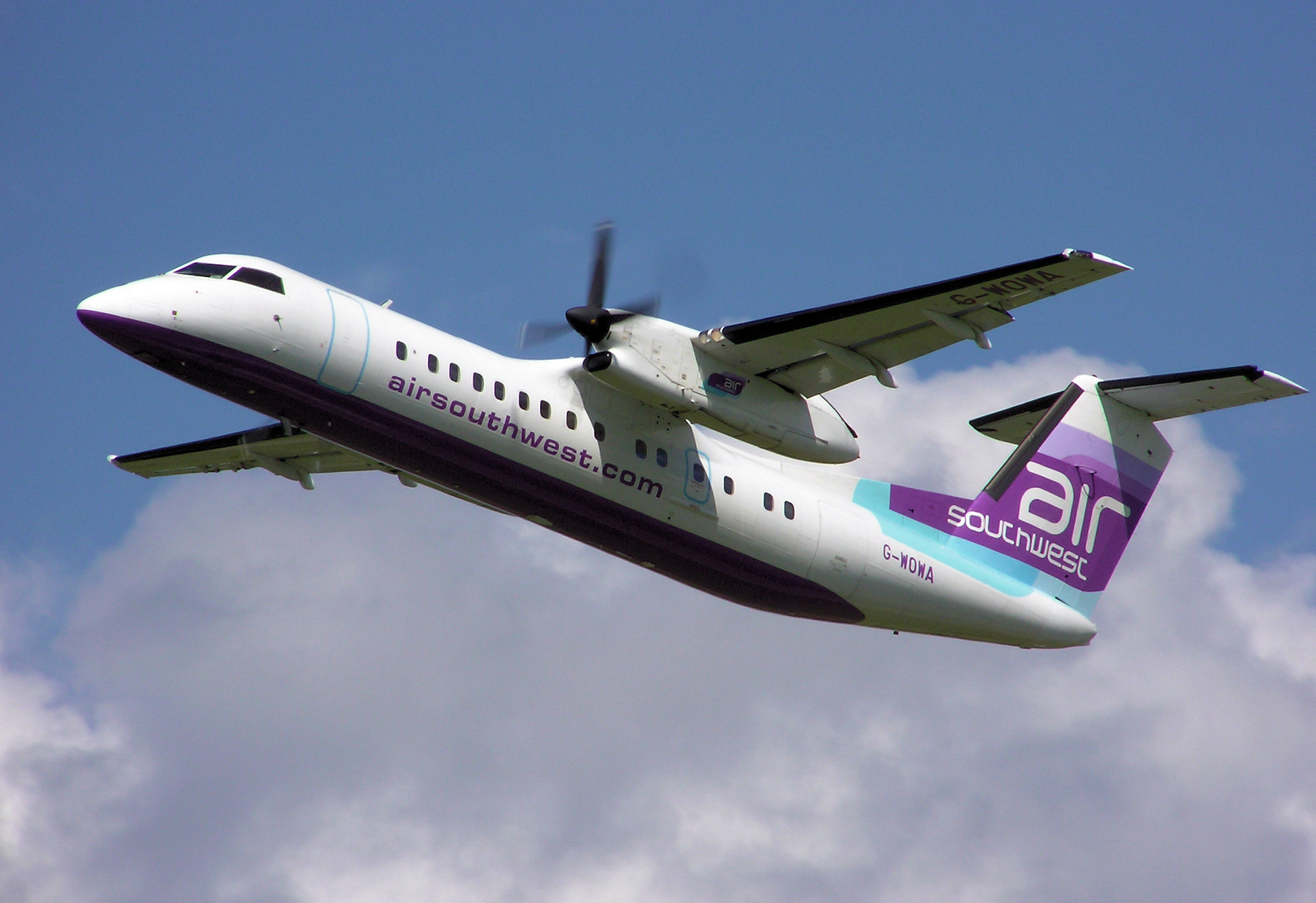
Dash 8 operated by Air Southwest

de Havilland Canada began development of the Dash 8 in the late 1970s in response to what it saw as a considerable market demand for a new generation 30 to 40 seat commuter airliner. The Dash 8 emphasized operational economics over STOL performance, which proved much more successful.

Like the Dash 7, the Dash 8 features a high mounted wing and T-tail, an advanced flight control system and large full length trailing edge flaps. Power is supplied by two Pratt & Whitney Canada PW120 series (originally designated PT7A) turboprops. The first flight of the first of two preproduction aircraft was on 20 June 1983, while Canadian certification was awarded on 28 September 1984. The first customer delivery was to NorOntair of Canada on 23 October 1984.

The aircraft was introduced just as an older generation of feederliners was becoming too old to maintain economically, and there were few other new aircraft designs of its size that were ready for purchase; the ATR-42 entered service a year later, while most other designs (Dornier 328, Fokker 50, etc.) were only started in response to the success of the Dash 8. To date over 1000 Dash 8's have been delivered. In April 2008, Bombardier announced that production of the 100, 200, and 300 series Dash 8's would be ended, leaving the Q400 as the only Dash 8 still in production.

== Aircraft built under licence ==
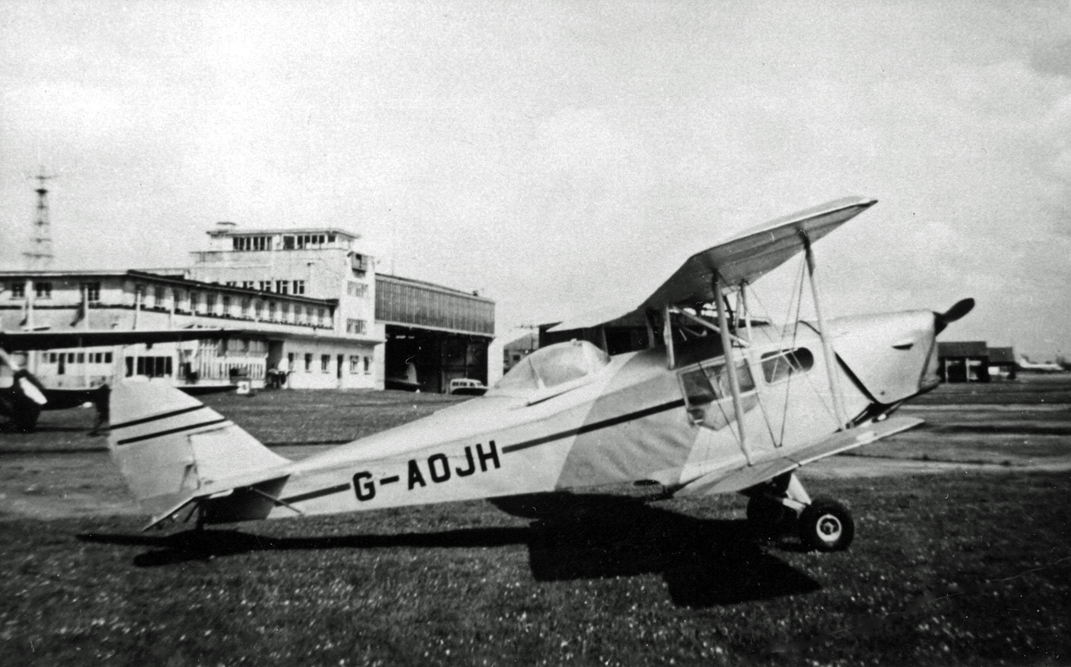
Canadian-built DH.83C Fox Moth with canopy fitted to pilot's position at Manchester (Ringway) Airport in 1955

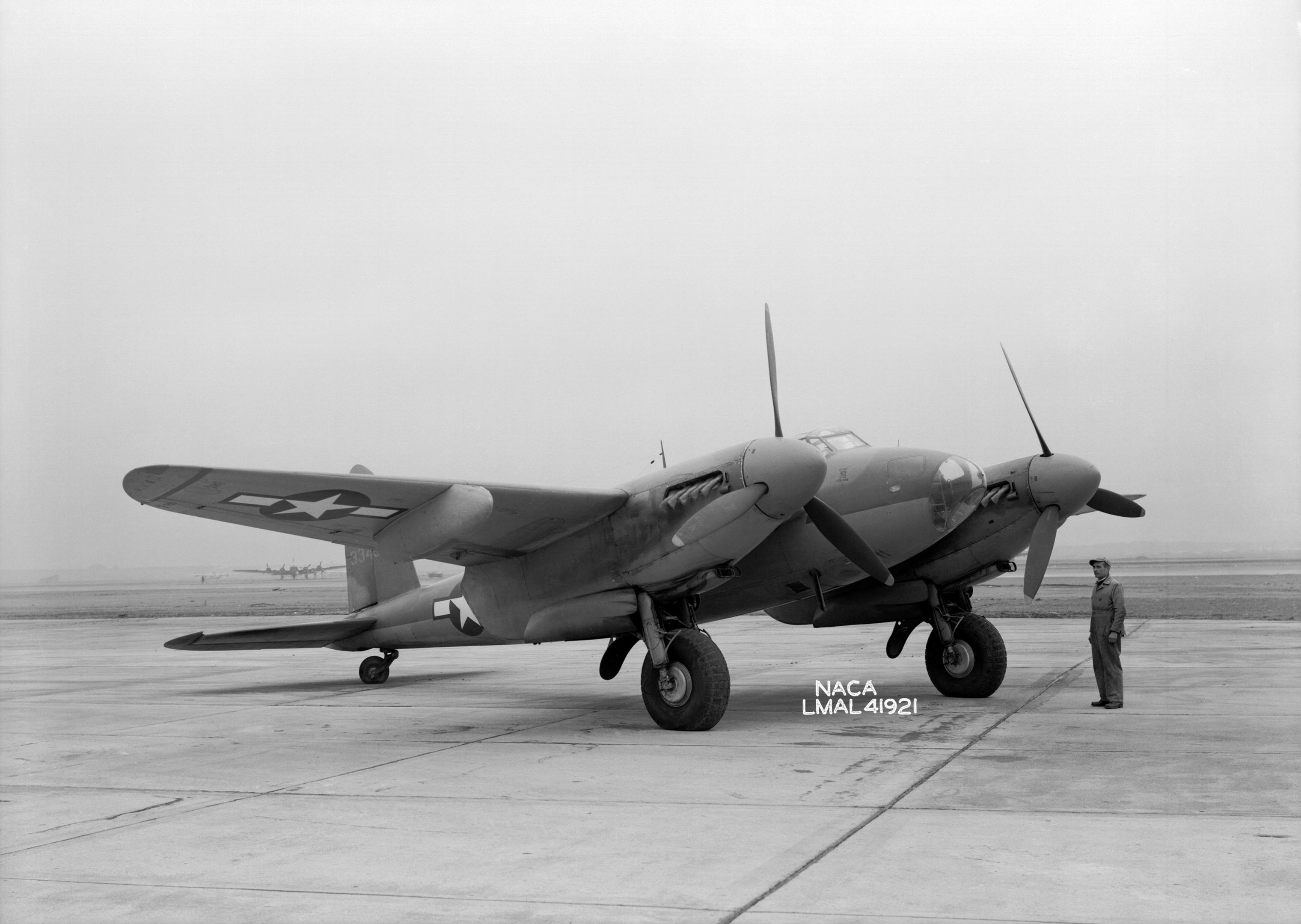
de Havilland Mosquito B Mk.XX, the Canadian version of B Mk.IV. One of the 40 USAAF F-8s.

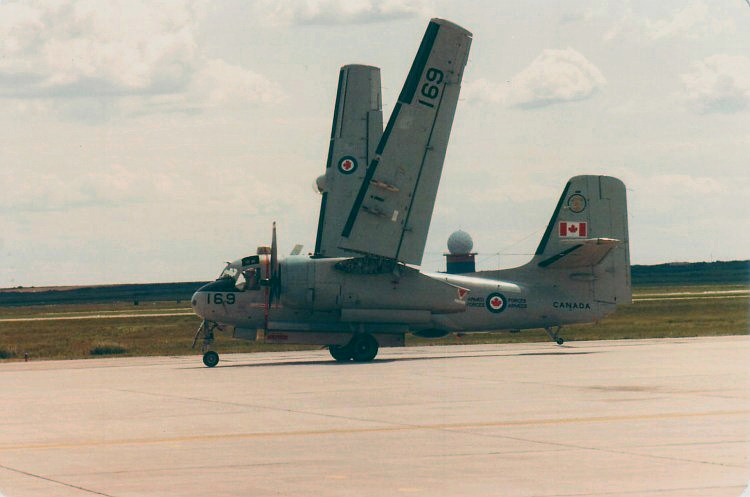
Canadair CS2F Tracker

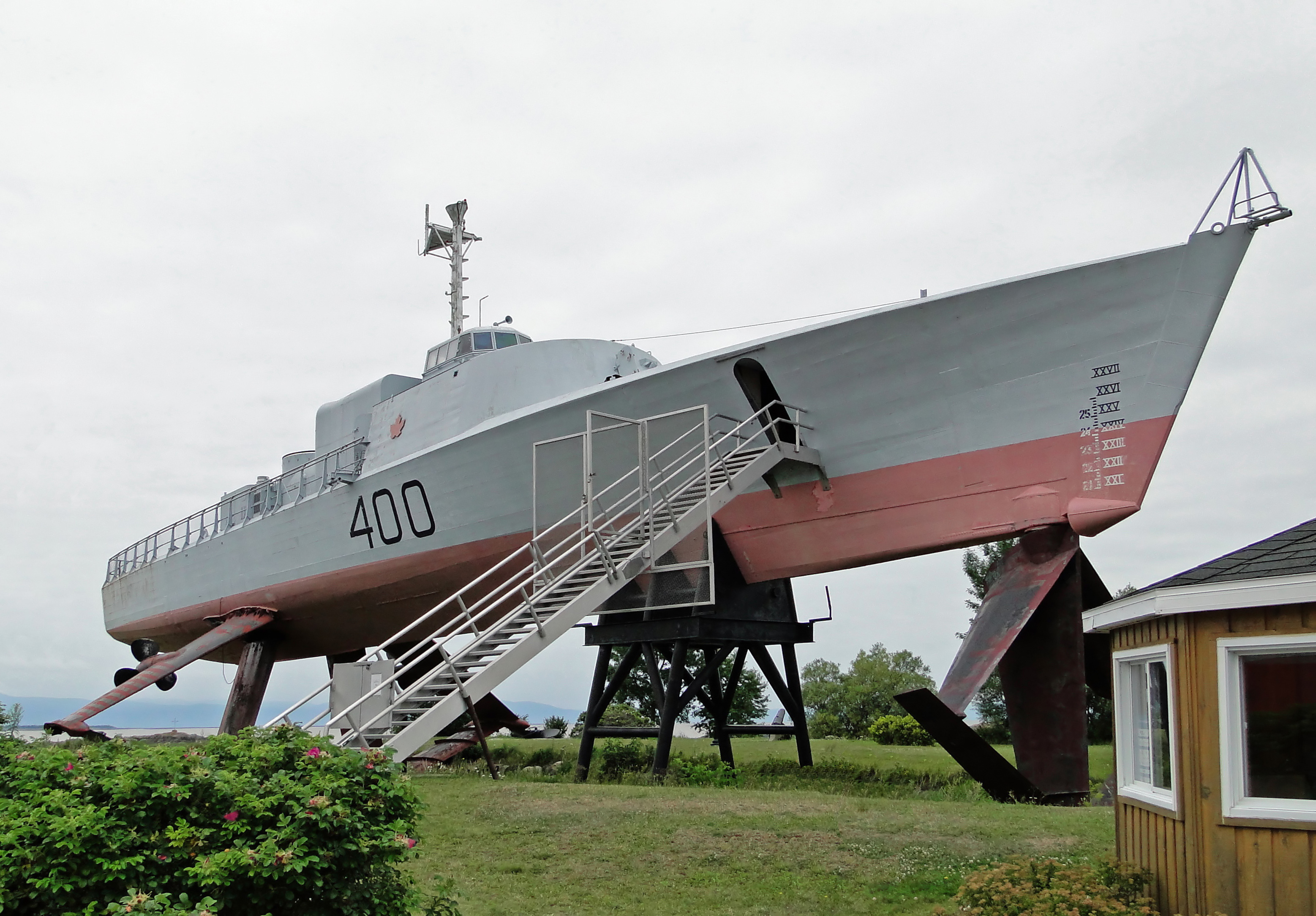
HMCS Bras d'Or

The de Havilland Canada company produced a large number of aircraft under licence, mostly versions of designs from its original parent company, British de Havilland Aircraft.

=== de Havilland Fox Moth ===
Fox Moths were produced in Canada after the Second World War mainly to keep the plant in production, but also to satisfy the increasing need for new bush aircraft. All the Canadian modifications made to the Tiger Moth were also applied to the Fox Moth. de Havilland designed a special stretcher for the Fox Moth, in order that it could operate as an air ambulance. Of the 53 produced, 39 remained in Canada, most of which were operated in float/ski configuration and gave years of satisfactory service.

The Fox Moth, though efficient, was a bit of an anachronism. For example, a modern, moulded plexiglas sliding cockpit hood was attached to what was essentially a 1932 aircraft. Communication between the passenger cabin in the fuselage and the cockpit to the rear was through a hole in the instrument panel.

=== de Havilland Mosquito ===
Before the end of the Second World War, de Havilland Canada built 1,134 Mosquitos, of which 444 were on strength with the RCAF in models Bomber Mk VII through Trainer Mk 29 from 1 June 1943 to 28 September 1951.

=== de Havilland Canada (Grumman) CS2F Tracker ===
In 1954, the Royal Canadian Navy decided to replace its fleet of obsolescent Grumman TBM Avenger anti-submarine warfare (ASW) aircraft with domestically produced licence-built versions of the new Grumman S2F Tracker. The contract for the CS2F was worth $100 million Canadian, at the time, the largest post-Second World War Canadian defense contract. Subassemblies of the aircraft would be produced by various Canadian companies and shipped to de Havilland Canada facilities, where de Havilland would build the forward fuselage and crew compartment, assemble the aircraft, oversee installation of the ASW electronics and prepare the aircraft for delivery.

The first Canadian-built Tracker flew on 31 May 1956. A total of 99 Trackers were produced for RCN service starting in the same year. A few of these aircraft would serve with the Canadian military until the 1990s.

A few ex-CF Trackers were sold to Ministry of Natural Resources (Ontario) (and later resold to Conair) for forest firefighting duties.

== Hydrofoil ==
HMCS Bras d'Or (FHE 400) was a hydrofoil built from 1960 to 1967 for the Royal Canadian Navy. It served from 1968 to 1971 as a testing platform for anti-submarine warfare technology on an ocean-going hydrofoil. During sea trials in 1969, the vessel exceeded 63 knots (117 km/h; 72 mph), making her possibly the fastest warship in the world. The vessel was constructed at Marine Industries Limited of Sorel, Quebec, with de Havilland Canada the prime contractor.

Retired by the navy, the hydrofoil now is displayed at the Musée maritime du Québec in L'Islet-sur-Mer, Quebec.

== Aircraft ==
Product list and details
| Aircraft | Purpose | Capacity | First flight | Span of production | Number built |
|---|---|---|---|---|---|
| de Havilland DH.60 Moth | Biplane trainer for the Royal Air Force (RAF) and Royal Canadian Air Force (RCAF) | Two crew | 1928 | | |
| de Havilland DH.82 Tiger Moth | Biplane trainer for the RAF and RCAF | Two crew | 1931 | | |
| de Havilland DH.83 Fox Moth | DH.83C variant for bush plane and private pilots | One crew and 3–4 passengers | 1945 | 1945–1948 | 53 |
| de Havilland DH.98 Mosquito | Multirole fighter and fighter bomber for the RAF and RCAF | Two crew | 1940–1945 | | |
| de Havilland Canada DHC-1 Chipmunk | Tandem trainer | Two crew | 1946 | 1947–1956 | 1,283 |
| de Havilland Canada or Viking Air DHC-2 Beaver | Bush plane | One crew and 7 passengers | 1947 | 1947–1967 | 1,657 |
| de Havilland Canada DHC-3 Otter | STOL bush plane | One crew and up to 11 passengers | 1951 | 1953–1967 | 466 |
| Grumman/de Havilland Canada CS2F Tracker under licence from Grumman | Anti-submarine warfare for the Royal Canadian Navy | Four crew | 1956 | 1956 | |
| de Havilland Canada DHC-4 Caribou | STOL cargo and tactical transport | Three crew and 32 troops or 24 fully equipped paratroops or 14 casualty stretchers | 1958 | 1961—late 1960s | 307 |
| de Havilland Canada DHC-5 Buffalo | STOL turboprop cargo and tactical transport | Three crew and 41 troops or 24 stretchers | 1961 | 1965; 1974 | 122 |
| de Havilland Canada or Viking Air DHC-6 Twin Otter | STOL utility aircraft | Two crew and 20 passengers | 1965 | 1966–1988; 2008—present (Viking Air) | 900+ |
| de Havilland Canada DHC-7 Dash 7 | STOL turboprop regional airliner | Two crew and 35 to 54 passengers | 1975 | 1978–1988 | 113 |
| de Havilland Canada or Bombardier DHC-8 Dash 8 | Turboprop regional airliner | Two or three crew and 37 to 90 passengers | 1983 | 1984—present | 1,100+ |

== See also ==
- Canadair
- Learjet
- List of civil aircraft
- List of STOL aircraft
- Shorts
