= Viking Air =

Former Canadian aircraft manufacturer

Viking Air Ltd.
- Type: Subsidiary
- Industry: Aerospace
- Founded: 1970; 56 years ago
- Founder: Nils Christensen
- Defunct: 2024
- Fate: Merged into De Havilland Canada
- Successor: De Havilland Canada
- Headquarters: North Saanich, British Columbia, Canada
- Key people: Dave Curtis (CEO circa 2006-2021), Brian Chafe (CEO)
- Products: DHC-2T Turbo Beaver
- Number of employees: 575
- Parent: Longview Aviation Capital
- Website: vikingair.com

Viking Air Ltd. was an operator and manufacturer of aircraft, as well as aircraft parts and systems, based at Victoria International Airport in North Saanich, British Columbia, Canada. The company provided upgrades to the DHC-2 Beaver, spare parts for older de Havilland Canada aircraft, and components for Bell Helicopter Textron. The company operated as a subsidiary of Longview Aviation Capital until it was amalgamated into it along with sister company De Havilland Canada in August 2024, with the resulting company using the De Havilland Canada name only.

== History ==
The company was established in 1970 by Norwegian-born Canadian aviation pioneer Nils Christensen, doing overhaul, maintenance and conversions to all types of aircraft but specializing in flying boats. In 1983, Christensen acquired the exclusive rights from de Havilland Canada to manufacture spare parts and to distribute the DHC-2 Beaver and the DHC-3 Otter aircraft. He retired as president of Viking Air in 1987.

The company was a subsidiary of Longview Aviation Capital, which is owned by Sherry Brydson, granddaughter of deceased newspaper magnate Roy Thomson and cousin of David Thomson, parties of the largest family fortune in Canada.

=== Acquisition of de Havilland Canada designs: DHC-1 through DHC-7 ===
In May 2005, the company purchased the parts and service business for all the older de Havilland Canada aircraft from Bombardier Aerospace. On 24 February 2006, Viking purchased the type certificates from Bombardier for all the discontinued de Havilland Canada designs: the DHC-1 Chipmunk, DHC-2 Beaver, DHC-3 Otter, DHC-4 Caribou, DHC-5 Buffalo, DHC-6 Twin Otter and DHC-7 Dash 7, giving Viking Air the right to manufacture new aircraft if a market should arise for such.

==== Restart of DHC production ====
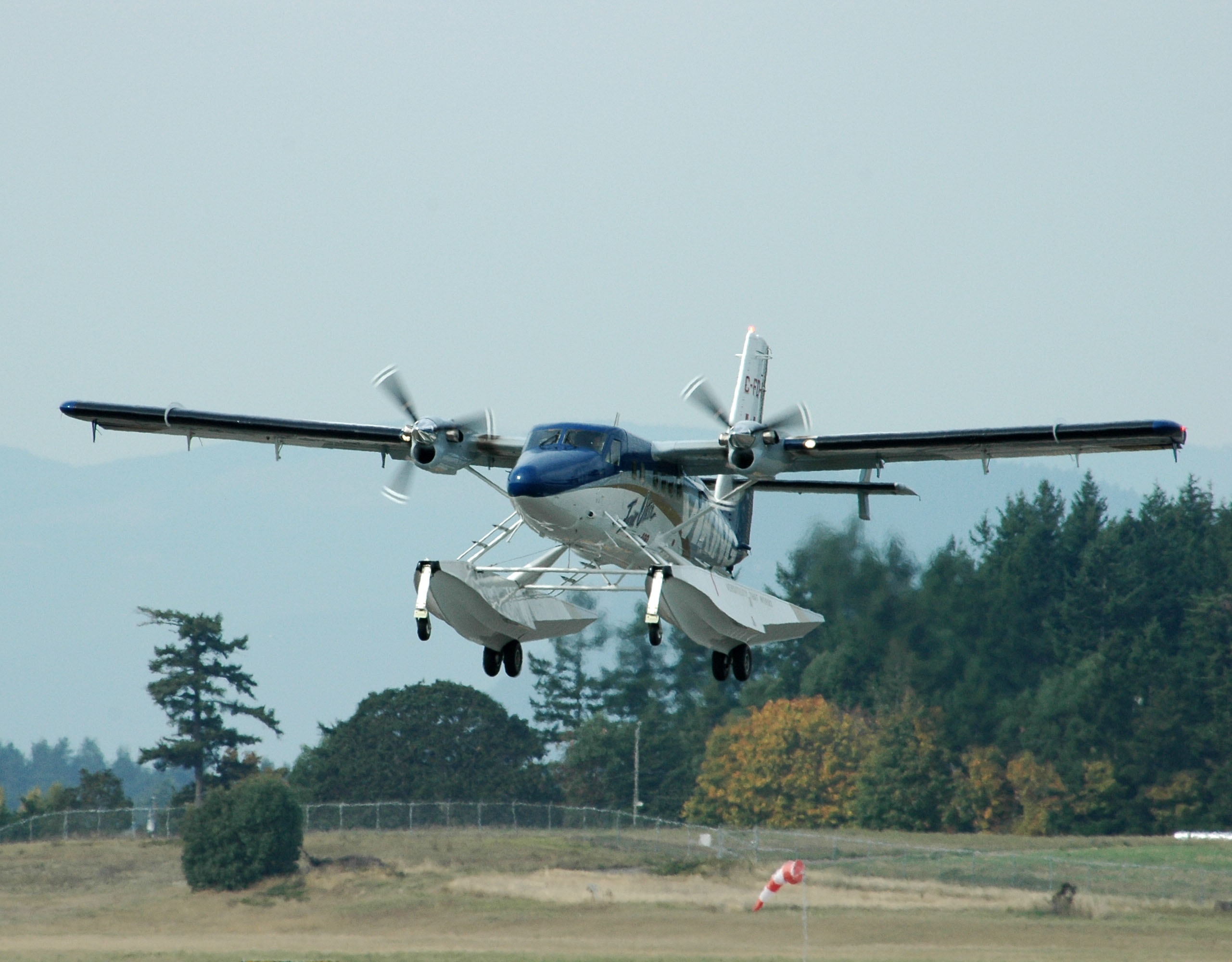
First flight of the Series 400 on 1 October 2008

On 2 April 2007, Viking announced that, nineteen years after being discontinued, with 27 orders and options in hand, it was restarting production of the Twin Otter with more powerful Pratt & Whitney Canada PT6A-34/35 engines. The first flight of the Series 400 technical demonstrator took place on 1 October 2008 at Victoria International Airport. In February 2010 the first new production Twin Otter Series 400 equipped with Honeywell's Primus Apex IFR digital flight deck and configured with a commuter interior took its first flight. The DHC-6-400 series Twin Otter design has all around better performance, it includes more power, space, and now can haul up to 4,280 lbs of freight.

Viking Air also produced upgraded DHC-2 Beavers fitted with a Pratt & Whitney Canada PT6A-34 turboprop engine called the DHC-2T Turbo Beaver.

In December 2008, Viking Air indicated its intention to put the DHC-5 Buffalo series back into production in Canada at their home factory in North Saanich or in Calgary, Alberta. A potential new production Buffalo would have had Pratt & Whitney Canada PW150 turboprops, a glass cockpit, enhanced vision and night vision goggle capability. The company proposed the aircraft as a replacement for the Royal Canadian Air Force fleet of existing DHC-5As but the aircraft was not included in the final assessment in 2016 which chose the EADS CASA C-295.

In September 2017, Viking Air announced that it would begin talking to potential customers interested in the CL-415 "SuperScooper" Waterbomber aircraft, with the potential of the company reviving production of the aircraft if it finds demand.

On March 31, 2022, De Havilland Canada Ltd. (under Viking Air) announced plans for the DHC-515 Firefighter Program. Formerly known as the CL-515 program, the new water bomber aircraft builds upon the iconic CL-215 and CL-415 firefighting aircraft with modern features and improvements. Production and final assembly are to occur in Calgary, Alberta, where support for existing in-service CL-215 and CL-415 aircraft takes place. The company has signed letters of intent for the purchase of the first 22 DHC-515 aircraft by European customers. The program is expected to bring 500 jobs to Calgary.

=== Further type certificate acquisitions ===
In 2006, Viking Air acquired the type certificate for the Trident TR-1 Trigull since 2006, along with the three prototypes built. On 20 June 2016, Viking announced the acquisition of the worldwide amphibious aircraft program from Bombardier, including the type certificate for the CL-215, CL-215T and CL-415 Waterbombers. The acquisition was finalized on 3 October. On 29 May 2018, five CL-415EAF were sold to US firefighting company Bridger Aerospace, Longview then expected to recruit 200 workers in Calgary for the conversions.

=== Dash-8 acquisition ===
On 8 November 2018, Viking Air parent Longview Aviation acquired the Bombardier Dash 8 program and the de Havilland brand from Bombardier and continued Q400 production in Downsview until its lease at the airport ended in 2021. The deal closed in the second half of 2019, bringing together all of the DHC type certificates under one umbrella once again. Bombardier announced the sale was for $300 million, and expected $250 million net. After the deal, Longview had $1 billion (US$670 million) in annual sales and 1,800 workers in Victoria, Calgary and Toronto. By November 2018 the sales of the higher-performance Q400 were slower than the cheaper aircraft from competitor ATR.

In January 2019, parent company Longview announced that it would establish a new company in Ontario, under the De Havilland Aircraft Company of Canada name, to continue production of the Bombardier Dash 8 line. The Dash 8 acquisition vaulted Longview from 600 to 700 employees to up to 2,000 employees including the CL-415 new production. After Bombardier sold the Q400 plant in Downsview, Ontario, Longview had three years to find a new location in Ontario where production was expected to stay along with 1,000 employees.

In February 2022, Longview consolidated its brands, with Viking Air, Longview Aviation, Pacific Sky Training and De Havilland Canada all being rebranded as De Havilland Aircraft of Canada.

Viking Air's existence as an independent company ended on 1 August 2024. It was amalgamated into parent company Longview Aviation Capital, along with sister company De Havilland Canada, with the resulting company using the De Havilland Canada name only. De Havilland Canada still retains Viking's former manufacturing facilities in North Saanich, BC, alongside former Longview Aviation Services facilities in Calgary, AB which are now used for final aircraft assembly.

== Products ==
- DHC-2T Turbo Beaver — remanufactured Beavers by Viking Air, upgraded with a Pratt & Whitney Canada PT6A-34 680 hp (507 kW) turboprop engine.

== Fleet ==
As of February 2023, Viking Air has the following aircraft listed with Transport Canada and operate as ICAO airline designator VKN, and call sign TRUE NORTH.

Viking Air fleet
Aircraft	No. of aircraft	Variants	Notes
de Havilland Canada DHC-1 Chipmunk	1		
de Havilland Canada DHC-2 Beaver	6	MK. I	
de Havilland Canada DHC-6 Twin Otter	2	Series 300, Series 310	
Trident TR-1 Trigull	2		Viking Air owns the two remaining prototype aircraft, serial # 1 and 3. In 2003 Viking Air indicated an interest in producing the Trigull as a turbine-powered amphibious aircraft, with a price at that time estimated at US$400,000, but since then no further news has been released.
Viking DHC-6 Twin Otter	10	Series 400	
Total	21		

== See also ==
- Bombardier Aerospace
- COM DEV International
- CMC Electronics
- Héroux-Devtek
- List of STOL aircraft
- MacDonald, Dettwiler and Associates
- Spar Aerospace

== External reading ==
- Sean Rossiter The Immortal Beaver: The World's Greatest Bush Plane , Douglas & McIntyre, 2005 ISBN 1-55054-724-0,
