= De Havilland Canada DHC-5 Buffalo =

Short takeoff and landing utility transport turboprop aircraft

DHC-5 Buffalo
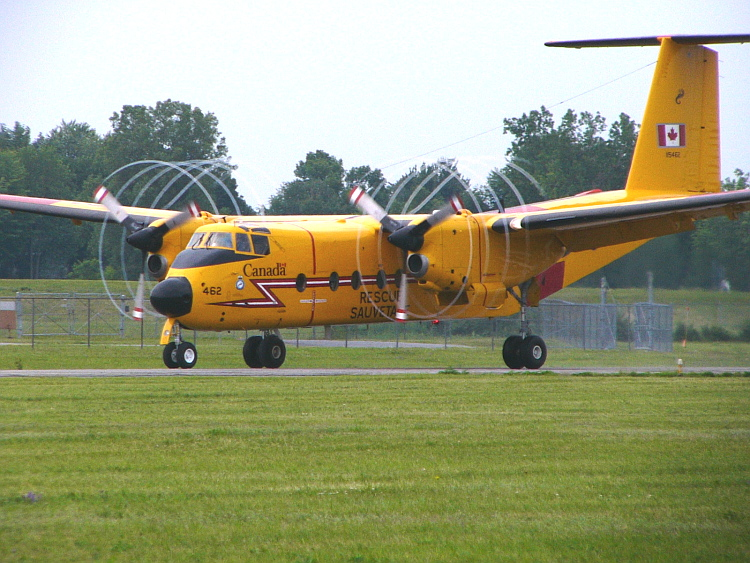
- A CC-115 Buffalo of 442 Transport & Rescue Squadron at Rockcliffe Airport in Ottawa, 2004

General information
- Type: Utility aircraft
- Manufacturer: de Havilland Canada
- Status: In limited service
- Primary user: Royal Canadian Air Force (historical)
- Number built: 122

History
- Manufactured: 1965–1972, 1974–1986
- Introduction date: 1965
- First flight: 9 April 1964
- Developed from: De Havilland Canada DHC-4 Caribou

The de Havilland Canada DHC-5 Buffalo is a short takeoff and landing (STOL) utility transport turboprop aircraft developed from the earlier piston-powered DHC-4 Caribou. The aircraft has extraordinary STOL performance and is able to take off in distances much shorter than even most light aircraft can manage. The aircraft was originally designed by de Havilland Canada, with the type certificate now owned by De Havilland Canada founded in 2019.

== Design and development ==
The Buffalo arose from a 1962 United States Army requirement for a STOL transport capable of carrying the same payload as the CH-47A Chinook helicopter. de Havilland Canada based its design to meet the requirement on an enlarged version of its DHC-4 Caribou, already in large-scale service with the United States Army, to be powered by General Electric T64 turboprops rather than the Pratt & Whitney R-2000 piston engines of the Caribou. (It had already flown a T64-powered Caribou on 22 September 1961).

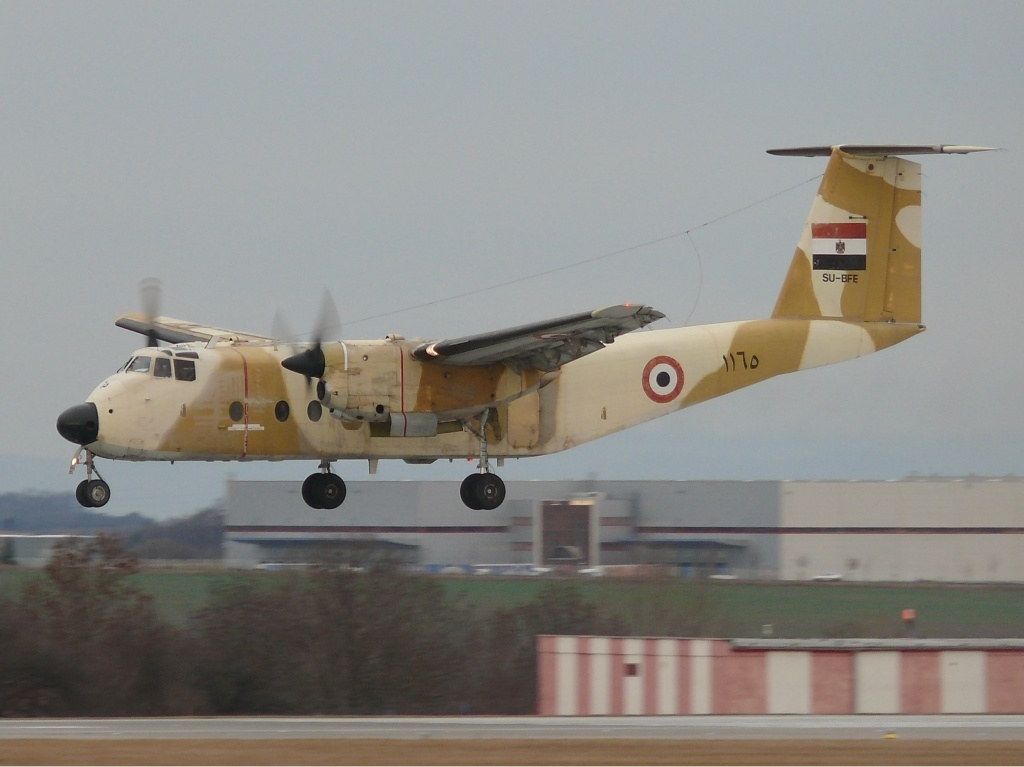
An Egyptian Air Force DHC-5D

De Havilland's design, the DHC-5 Buffalo, was chosen as the winner of the United States Army competition in early 1963, with four DHC-5s, designated YAC-2 (later CV-7A and subsequently C-8A) ordered. The first of these aircraft made its maiden flight on 9 April 1964. All four aircraft were delivered in 1965, the Buffalo carrying nearly twice the payload as the Caribou while having better STOL performance. The prototype CV-7A was exhibited by the manufacturer at the 1965 Paris Air Show wearing US Army markings. No further US orders followed, however, as at the start of 1967 (See the Johnson-McConnell agreement of 1966), inter-service politics led to large fixed-wing transports being transferred to the United States Air Force, who considered themselves adequately equipped with the Fairchild C-123 Provider.

Company data claims a takeoff distance over a 50 ft (15 m) obstacle of 1,210 ft (370 m) at 41,000 lb (19,000 kg) and a landing distance of over a 50 ft (15 m) obstacle of 980 ft (300 m) at 39,100 lb (17,700 kg) for the DHC-5A model.

In the early 1980s, de Havilland Canada attempted to modify the Buffalo for civilian use. The aircraft was to be branded as the "Transporter." After loss of the demonstration aircraft (SN 103 C-GCTC) at the 1984 Farnborough Airshow, the project was abandoned.

A production DHC-5D Buffalo was used for breaking time-to-height records for the weight category 12,000–16,000 kg (26,000–35,000 lb) on 16 February 1976, reaching 3,000 m (9,800 ft) in 2 min 12.75 sec, 6,000 m (20,000 ft) in 4 min 27.5 sec and 9,000 m (30,000 ft) in 8 min 3.5 sec.

=== New production ===
On 24 February 2006, Viking Air of Victoria, British Columbia, a manufacturer of replacement parts for all out-of-production de Havilland Canada aircraft, purchased the type certificates from Bombardier Aerospace for all versions of the DHC-1 through DHC-7 series aircraft, giving Viking exclusive rights to manufacture and sell new aircraft of those types. In December 2008, Viking Air indicated their intention to put the Buffalo series back into production at their home factory in Victoria, British Columbia or in Calgary, Alberta. A potential new production Buffalo would have had Pratt & Whitney Canada PW150 turboprops, a glass cockpit, enhanced vision and night vision goggle capability. The aircraft was proposed as a replacement for the Royal Canadian Air Force fleet of existing DHC-5As but was not one of the three aircraft in the final assessment, in 2016, which selected the EADS CASA C-295. Several letters of intent for the DHC-5NG were received in 2014.

== Operational history ==
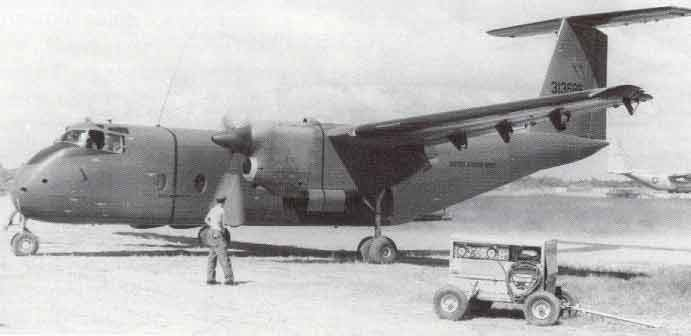
United States Army CV-7A at Bien Hoa Air Base, Vietnam, November 1965

In late 1965, one of the prototype DHC-5s operated by the U.S. Army was deployed to Bien Hoa Air Base in South Vietnam for a three-month evaluation period, assigned to the 2nd Flight Platoon of the 92nd Aviation Company.

The Royal Canadian Air Force first acquired 15 DHC-5A designated as CC-115 for tactical transports. These were initially operated at CFB St Hubert, QC by No. 429 Squadron in a tactical aviation role as part of Mobile Command. In 1970, the Buffalo aircraft were transferred to a transport and rescue role with No. 442 Squadron, No. 413 Squadron and No. 424 Squadron as part of Transport Command. No. 426 Squadron also flew the aircraft for training. Some were leased back or loaned back to the factory for trials and eventually returned to military service.

Three of the aircraft were also deployed on UN missions to the Middle East with No. 116 Transport Unit until 1979. They had a white paint scheme which was retained while they were serving in domestic transport with 424 Sqn in between deployments. On 9 August 1974, Canadian Forces CC-115 Buffalo 115461 was shot down by a Syrian surface-to-air missile, killing all nine CF personnel on board. This represents the single biggest loss of Canadian lives on a UN mission as well as the most recent Canadian military aircraft to be shot down.

Production of the DHC-5A ended in 1972 after sales to Brazil and Peru but restarted with the DHC-5D model in 1974. This variant sold to several overseas air forces beginning with Egypt. Production of the DHC-5D ended in December 1986.

In 1975, the Buffalo dropped its tactical transport role and was converted to domestic search and rescue, except for a few that kept serving on UN missions. The initial paint scheme for the SAR converted aircraft were white and red while others still had the original drab paint. The previous drab paint and white paint were eventually replaced with the distinctive yellow and red scheme commonly seen today. The number of aircraft have been reduced to eight, with six on active service, one in storage (recently dismantled) and one used for battle damage training. The remaining operational Buffalos operate in the Search and Rescue role for No. 442 Squadron at CFB Comox. Air Command was renamed the Royal Canadian Air Force in 2011, meaning the CC-115 has served with the RCAF, Air Command and now the RCAF once again. The Buffalo was replaced by the CC-130 Hercules aircraft at search-and-rescue bases in CFB Greenwood and CFB Trenton. As early as 2002, Canada has tried to replace both the Buffalo fleet and the SAR Hercules fleet with a newer aircraft. For some time, the Alenia C-27J Spartan was seen as the likely replacement, with the government considering sole-sourcing the new aircraft. However, after changes in Canada's defence budget as well as accusations of bias from the aerospace industry, the Buffalo replacement program was relaunched as an open competition. After review from the National Research Council, the Department of National Defence as well as consultation with the Canadian aerospace industry, a request for proposal was published in 2015. Bidders included Alenia offering the C-27J Spartan, Airbus Defence and Space with its C-295 and Embraer with its KC-390. In 2016, the Department of National Defence awarded Airbus a contract for 16 C-295s with delivery scheduled to begin in 2019 and running through 2022.

On 15 January 2022, the RCAF officially retired the final two operational CC-115s. The last operational aircraft is preserved at Canada Aviation and Space Museum in Ottawa.

== Demonstrators for new technologies ==
The Buffalo was a suitable airframe for converting to demonstrate some new technologies.

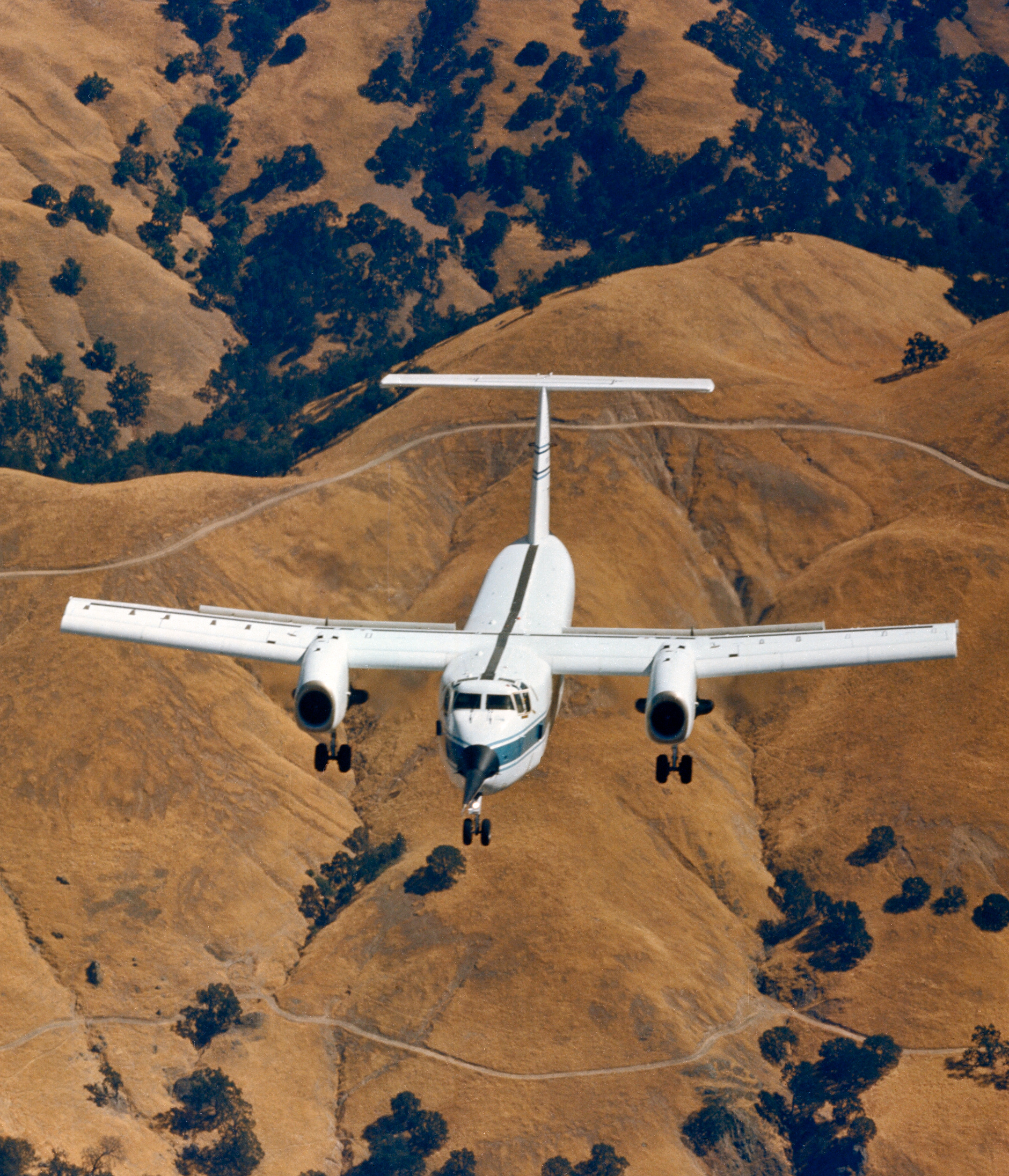
The Boeing/NASA Augmented Wing Jet-flap STOL Research Aircraft in flight

=== Augmented Wing Jet-flap STOL Research Aircraft ===
A cooperative NASA/Canadian Government research program on augmentor wing concepts started in 1965 and culminated in the need for a proof-of-concept aircraft. A NASA C-8A Buffalo (later named Bisontennial in 1976) was modified in 1972 for augmentor-wing jet STOL research. The modifications were done by Boeing, de Havilland Canada and Rolls-Royce of Canada Ltd. The wing had a reduced span to give a wing loading representative of future aircraft. It also had full-span leading edge slats, blown ailerons and double-surface flaps enclosing a venturi-shaped passage. The usual turboprop engines were replaced with Rolls-Royce Spey 801 SF (Split Flow) bypass engines with a new bypass duct which separated the hot and cold flows to provide both propulsion and augmentor airflow to the powered lift system. The hot flow was directed through Pegasus-engine swivelling nozzles to ensure it deflected with the flap downwash. The cold flow was directed into the flap venturi and entrained extra airflow. Beginning in 1972 with its first flight in this experimental configuration, this aircraft was used jointly by the NASA Ames Research Center and the Canadian Department of Industry, Trade and Commerce for STOL research.

=== Quiet Short-Haul Research Aircraft ===
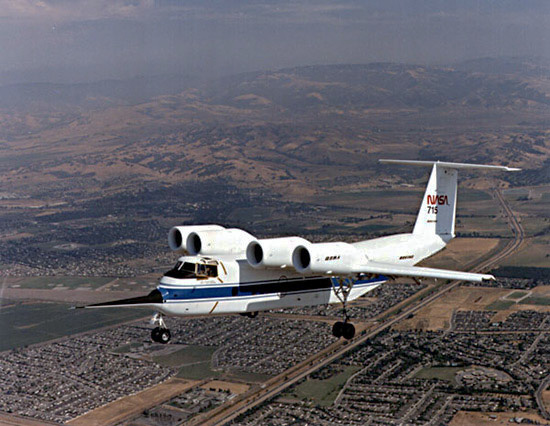
The NASA-Boeing Quiet Short-Haul Research Aircraft

In the late 1970s and early 1980s, NASA used another C-8A Buffalo in the Quiet Short-Haul Research Aircraft program.

Boeing designed and installed an experimental swept, supercritical wing incorporating a boundary layer control system. Instead of the standard engines, this aircraft was powered by four prototype Avco Lycoming YF102 high-bypass turbofan engines (originally from the Northrop YA-9 program) mounted above the wing to take advantage of the Coandă effect. In 1980, this aircraft participated in carrier trials aboard USS Kitty Hawk, demonstrating STOL performance without the use of catapults or arrestor gear.

The aircraft is currently stored at NASA's Ames Research Center in Mountain View, California. It was put up for auction in December 2023.

=== Air Cushion Landing System Aircraft ===
External image
- Illustration of a deployed ALCS from the underside of the airplane

After demonstrations by Bell aircraft using a Lake LA-4 fitted with an Air Cushion Landing Gear, the USAF and the Canadian Government wished to further explore the applications of the ACLS. They did so by retrofitting a similar system to a C-8A Buffalo. The air cushion system was inflated by two underwing air supply packages consisting of PT6F-70 turbofans powering two-stage axial flow fans. The aircraft also had underwing combination floats/skids.

== Variants ==
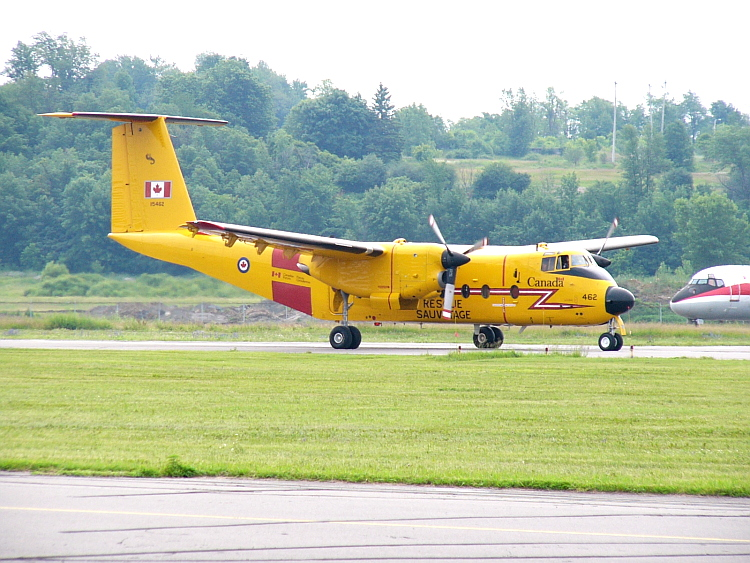
A CC-115 Buffalo of 442 Transport & Rescue Squadron

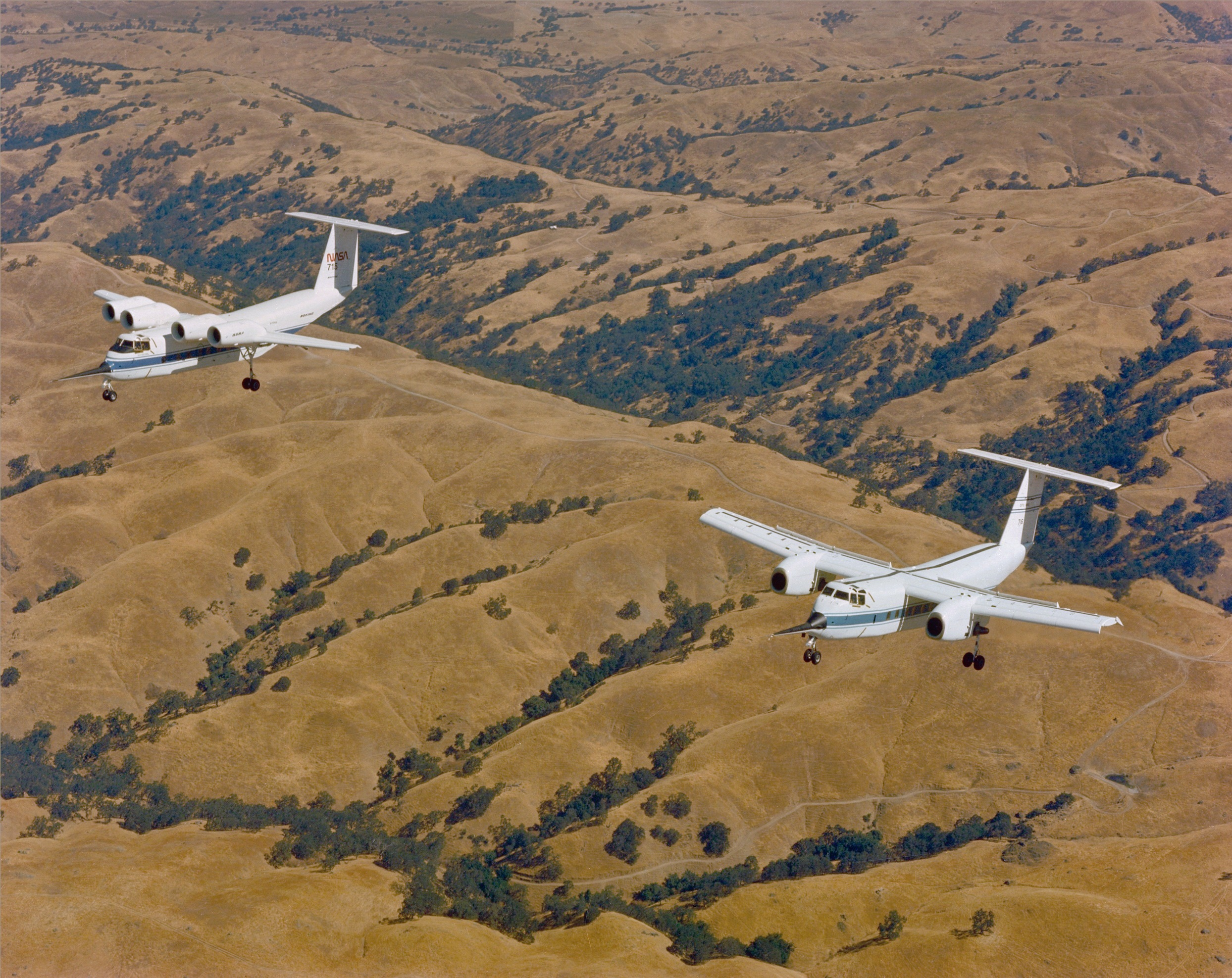
The Quiet Short-Haul Research Aircraft (NASA 715) and C-8A Augmented Wing Jet-flap STOL Research Aircraft (NASA 716) on the maiden flight to Ames from Seattle, Washington after conversion.

DHC-5 Buffalo
Originally designed as a twin-engined STOL tactical, utility transport aircraft for the US Army. Original US Army designation AC-2.
DHC-5A
Utility transport aircraft for the Brazilian Air Force, Royal Canadian Air Force and Peruvian Air Force. Canadian designation CC-115
DHC-5B
Proposed version, powered by two General-Electric CT64-P4C turboprop engines. Not built.
DHC-5C
Proposed version, powered by two Rolls-Royce Dart RDa.12 turboprop engines. Not built.
DHC-5D
Improved version, powered by two 2,336 kW (3,133 shp) General Electric CT64-820-4 turboprop engines.
DHC-5E Transporter
Civil transport version.
NASA / DITC C-8A AWJSRA
One C-8A aircraft converted into an augmentor wing research aircraft.
XC-8A ACLS
One C-8A aircraft converted into an air-cushion landing system research aircraft.
NASA / Boeing QSRA C-8A
One C-8A converted into a quiet short-haul research aircraft.
Viking DHC-5NG Buffalo NG
Proposed redesigned new production version to be built by Viking Air. NG is the company marketing term indicating Next Generation

=== Canadian military designations ===
CC-115
Canadian military designation for 15 DHC-5As.

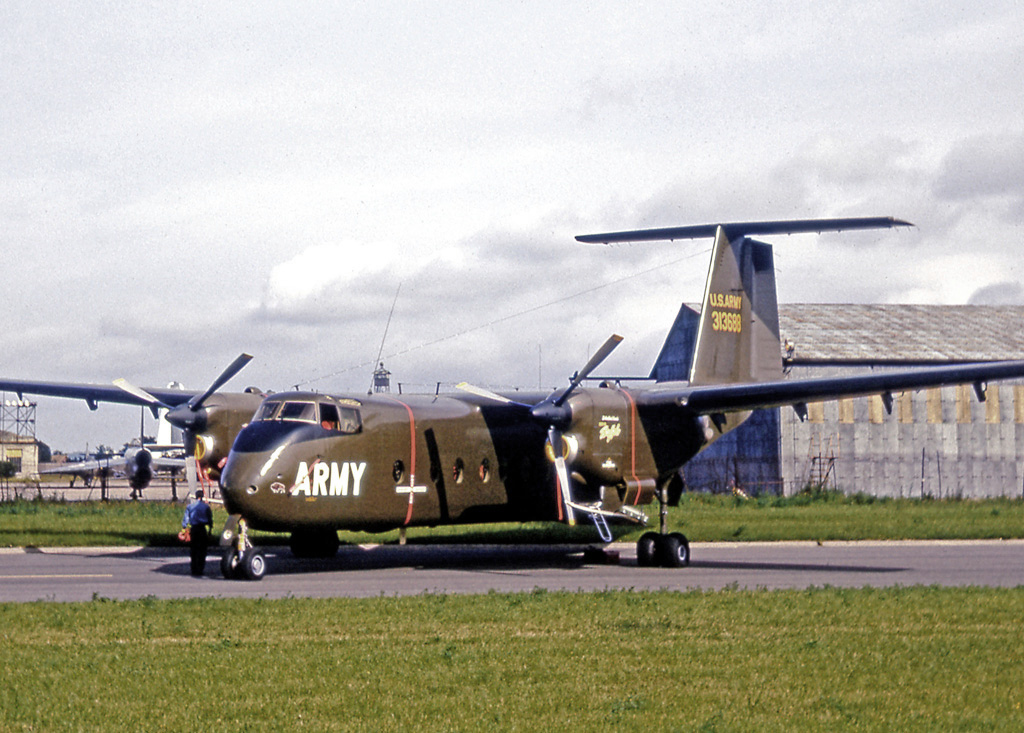
The prototype Buffalo exhibited at the 1965 Paris Air Show as a US Army CV-7A

=== United States military designations ===
AC-2
Designation for four DHC-5s for evaluation by the United States Army.
CV-7A
Redesignation of four United States Army AC-2s.
C-8A
United States Air Force designation for four CV-7As transferred from the Army in 1967.

=== Brazilian military designations ===
C-115
Designation for the DHC-5A.

== Operators ==
=== Civil ===
Canada

- Summit Air (8199400 Canada Inc.) operated two DHC-5D (ex-Oman Police Air Wing 1979 and 1981/Shuttle Air Cargo (Congo); transferred from Arctic Sunwest Charters in 2013); C-FASV was sold to Nyassa Air Taxi (Malawi) 2015 with lease to UN OFP and C-FASY stored since 2012 (civil registration cancelled in 2015)

Ethiopia

- Ethiopian Airlines 1 DHC-5D (ET-AHI lost in crash 1988)

Malawi

- Nyassa Air Taxi 1 ex-Summit Air DHC-5D

=== Military ===
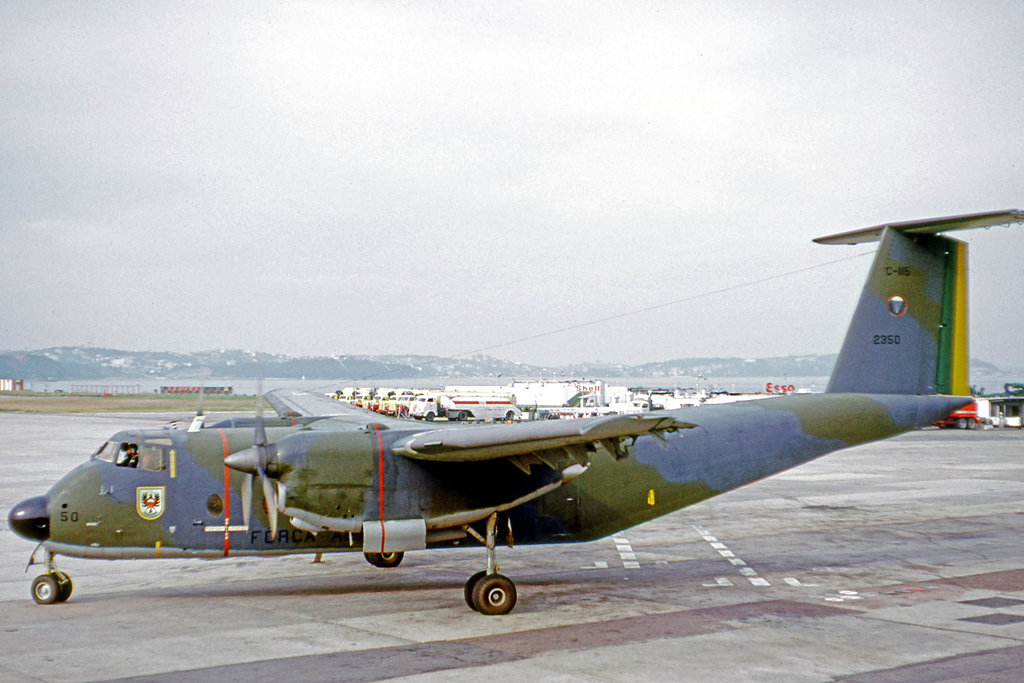
C-115 Buffalo of the Brazilian Air Force at Rio de Janeiro's Galeao Airport in 1972

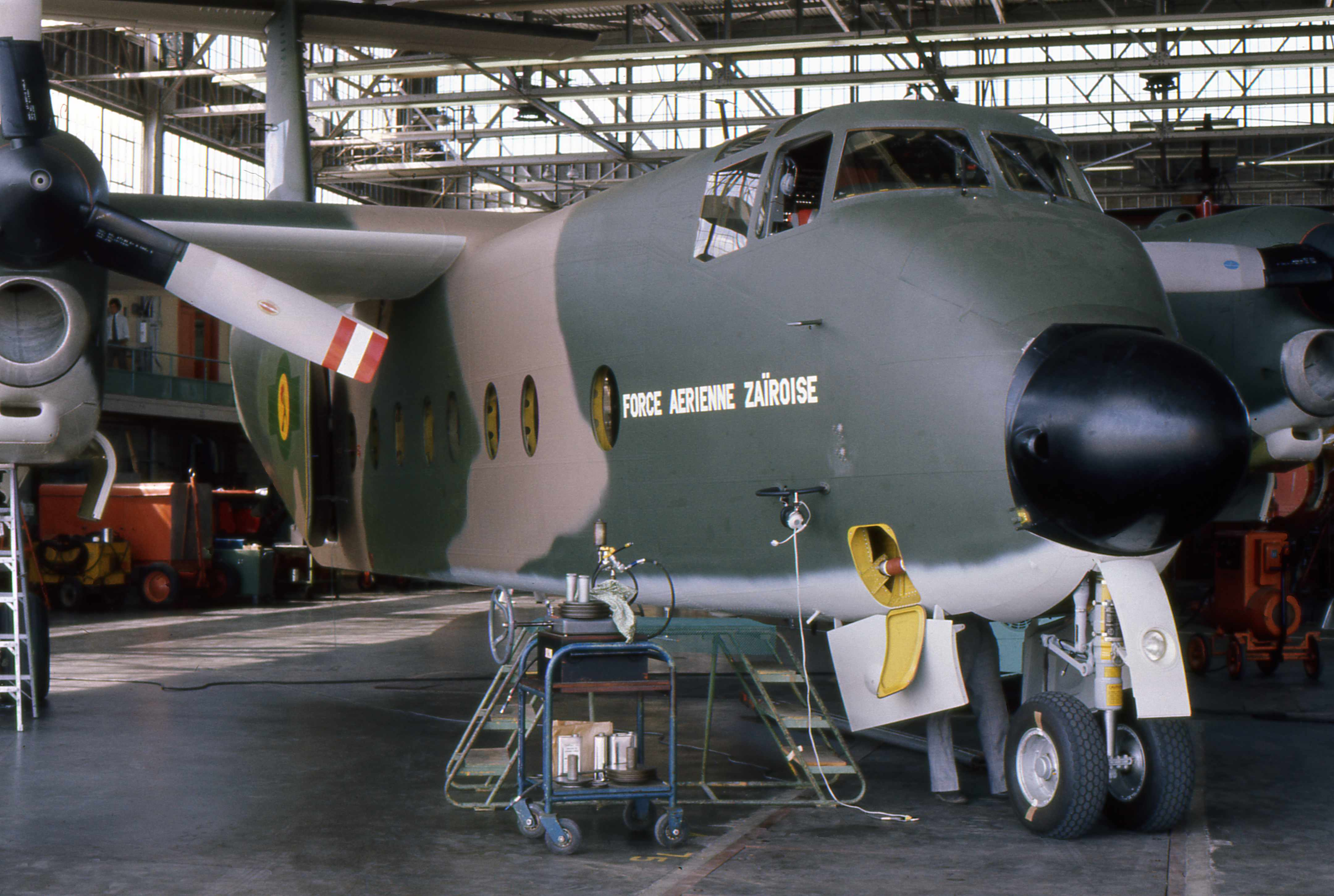
A Buffalo in the colours of the Force Aérienne Zairoise in 1975

This is a list of former military operators. The last six RCAF Buffalos served with No. 442 Transport and Rescue Squadron based in Comox, BC, until the type was finally retired in 2022 after 55 years of service.

Abu Dhabi / United Arab Emirates

- Abu Dhabi Defence Forces Air Wing – (Retired).
- United Arab Emirates Air Force (Retired)

Brazil

- Brazilian Air Force (Retired)

Cameroon

- Cameroon Air Force (Retired)

Canada

- Royal Canadian Air Force (Retired)

Chile

- Chilean Air Force (Retired)

Democratic Republic of the Congo (previously Zaire)

- Air Force of the Democratic Republic of the Congo (Retired)

Ecuador

- Ecuadorian Air Force (Retired)
- Ecuadorian Army (Retired)

Egypt

- Egyptian Air Force (9) (Retired)

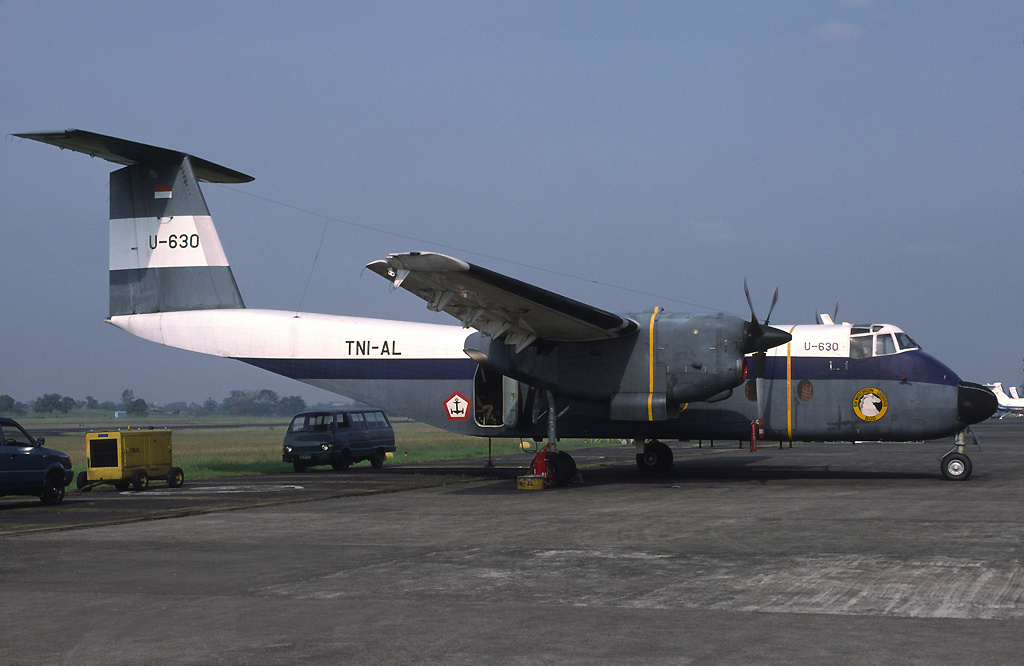
Indonesian Navy De Havilland Canada DHC-5D

Indonesia

- Indonesian Army (ex-UAE, Retired)
- Indonesian Navy (ex-UAE, Retired)

Kenya

- Kenya Air Force (Retired)

Mauritania

- Mauritanian Air Force - bought four DHC-5Ds in 1978 (Retired)

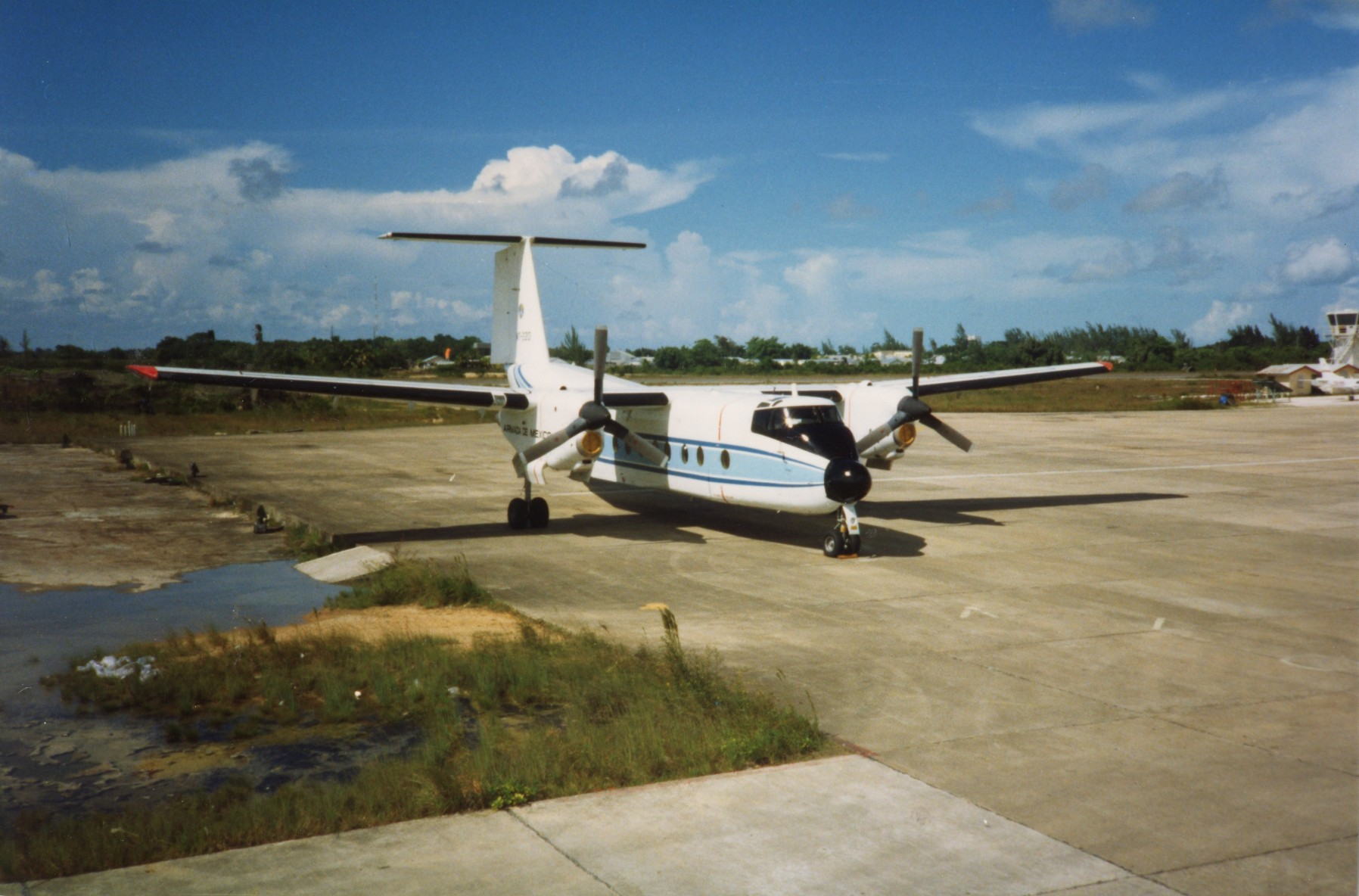
A Mexican Navy DHC-5 at Belize International Airport

Mexico

- Mexican Navy (Retired)

Oman

- Royal Oman Police Air Wing (Retired)

Peru

- Peruvian Air Force (Retired)

Sudan

- Sudanese Air Force – 4 (Retired)

Tanzania

- Tanzania Air Force Command – 6 (retired)

Togo

- Military of Togo (Retired)

United States

- United States Army (Retired)
- NASA 2 C-8A at Ames Research Center (Retired)

Zambia

- Zambian Air Force (Retired)

== Accidents and incidents ==
In total, 26 accidents involving hull losses have been recorded.

- On 9 August 1974, a Canadian Forces CC-115 operating for the United Nations was shot down over Syria with the loss of five crew and four passengers.
- On 27 May 1979, a Mauritania Islamic Air Force DHC-5D crashed in the sea off the coast of Dakar, Senegal, killing all 12 occupants of the aircraft. The Prime Minister of Mauritania Ahmed Ould Bouceif died in the crash.
- On 22 December 1979, a Peruvian Air Force DHC-5D (reg. FAP-348, msn. 55) on a flight from Pucallpa Airport crashed near Puerto Esperanza, in Peru's Amazon jungle, killing all 29 occupants.
- At the 1984 Farnborough Airshow, a DHC-5D STOL demonstration ended in a very heavy landing which destroyed the aircraft.
- On 21 June 1989, a Peruvian Air Force DHC-5D Buffalo crashed into a mountain near Tarma, killing all six crew and 53 passengers in the deadliest accident involving the DHC-5 Buffalo.
- On 17 February 1990, a Zambian Air Force DHC-5D Buffalo crashed on approach to Lusaka Airport in Lusaka, Zambia, killing all 29 people on board.
- On 16 April 1992, a Kenya Air Force DHC-5D Buffalo lost power in one of its engines, and during its final approach, it overshot the runway and crashed into a residential area near Moi Air Base, Kenya. The accident killed all 42 passengers and four crew members and six people on the ground.
- On 27 April 1993, a Zambian Air Force DHC-5D Buffalo carrying most of the Zambian national football team to a FIFA World Cup Qualifier against Senegal in Dakar crashed shortly after takeoff from a refuelling stop in Libreville, Gabon. There were no survivors.
- On 22 March 2025, a Trident Aviation DHC-5D Buffalo crashed near Ceel Xabaalbow, Somalia, killing all five people on board.

== Aircraft on display ==
=== Brazil ===
- FAB2351 – C-115 on static display at the Academia da Força Aérea (AFA) in Pirassununga, São Paulo.
- FAB2368 – C-115 on static display at the Brazilian Military Museum in Panambi, Rio Grande do Sul.
- FAB2371 – C-115 on static display at the Museu Aeroespacial in Rio de Janeiro.

=== Canada ===
- 811 – DHC-5A on static display at the Canadian Warplane Heritage Museum in Mount Hope, Ontario.
- 115451 – CC-115 on static display at Air Force Heritage Park in Summerside, Prince Edward Island.
- 115452 – CC-115 on static display at the Canada Aviation and Space Museum in Ottawa, Ontario.
- 115456 – CC-115 on static display at the National Air Force Museum of Canada in Astra, Ontario.
- 115457 – CC-115 on static display at the Comox Air Force Museum at CFB Comox in Comox, British Columbia.
- 115462 – CC-115 on static display at the Royal Aviation Museum of Western Canada in Winnipeg, Manitoba.

== Specifications (DHC-5D) ==
Data from Jane's All The World's Aircraft 1982–83

General characteristics

- Crew: 3 (pilot, co-pilot and crew chief)
- Capacity: 41 troops or 24 stretchers or 18,000 lb (8,200 kg) payload
- Length: 79 ft 0 in (24.08 m)
- Wingspan: 96 ft 0 in (29.26 m)
- Height: 28 ft 8 in (8.74 m)
- Wing area: 945 sq ft (87.8 m^{2})
- Aspect ratio: 9.75:1
- Airfoil: root: NACA 64_{3}A417.5 (mod); tip: NACA 63_{2}A615
- Empty weight: 25,160 lb (11,412 kg)
- Max takeoff weight: 49,200 lb (22,317 kg)
- Fuel capacity: 1,755 imp gal (2,108 US gal; 7,980 L)
- Powerplant: 2 × General Electric CT64-820-4 turboprop engines, 3,133 shp (2,336 kW) each
- Propellers: 3-bladed Hamilton Standard 63E60-25, 14 ft 6 in (4.42 m) diameter fully-feathering reversible-pitch propellers

Performance

- Cruise speed: 227 kn (261 mph, 420 km/h) maximum at 10,000 ft (3,000 m)
- Stall speed: 73 kn (84 mph, 135 km/h) 40 degree flaps at 46,900 lb (21,300 kg)
- Range: 600 nmi (690 mi, 1,100 km) at 10,000 ft (3,000 m) with maximum payload
- Ferry range: 1,770 nmi (2,040 mi, 3,280 km) zero payload
- Service ceiling: 31,000 ft (9,400 m)
- g limits: 2.5g (manoeuvring limit load)
- Rate of climb: 1,820 ft/min (9.2 m/s)
- Take-off run: 2,300 ft (700 m)
- Take-off distance to 50 ft (15 m): 2,750 ft (840 m) (mid cg range)
- Landing run: 850 ft (260 m)
- Landing distance from 50 ft (15 m): 2,010 ft (610 m)

== See also ==
Related development

- de Havilland Canada DHC-4 Caribou

Aircraft of comparable role, configuration, and era

- Aeritalia G.222
- Antonov An-32
- Transall C-160

Related lists

- List of active Canadian military aircraft
- List of carrier-based aircraft
