= De Havilland Canada =

Canadian aircraft manufacturer

De Havilland Aircraft of Canada Limited
- Type: Private
- Industry: Aerospace
- Predecessor: de Havilland Canada (Aircraft designs); Viking Air
- Founded: 2019; 7 years ago
- Headquarters: Calgary, Alberta, Canada
- Key people: Brian Chafe (CEO); Gerry Kelly (COO)
- Products: DHC-6 Twin Otter; DHC-8 Dash 8; DHC-515 Firefighter
- Number of employees: 2,100
- Parent: Longview Aviation Capital (Until 2024)
- Website: dehavilland.com

De Havilland Aircraft of Canada Limited (DHC) is a Canadian aircraft manufacturer founded in 2019 that purchased the aircraft programs of the original de Havilland Canada, which was founded in 1928. The aircraft types currently in production or planned for production include the DHC-6 Twin Otter, DHC-8 Dash 8, and DHC-515 Firefighter turboprop aircraft. The company's primary facilities were located in the Downsview area of Toronto, Ontario, but in 2022, it was announced that it would relocate primary manufacturing to De Havilland Field, under development near Calgary, Alberta.

The original de Havilland Aircraft of Canada, Limited, was created in 1928 by the British de Havilland Aircraft Company to build Moth aircraft for the training of Canadian airmen, and subsequently after the Second World War, designed and produced indigenous designs. In the 1980s, the government of Canada under Prime Minister Brian Mulroney privatized DHC and in 1986 sold the aircraft company to then Seattle-based Boeing. DHC was eventually acquired by Montreal-based Bombardier Aerospace in 1992 after cumulative losses of US$636 million over five years under Boeing.

In 2006, Viking Air of Victoria, British Columbia, purchased the type certificates for all the original out-of-production de Havilland Canada designs (DHC-1 to DHC-7). In November 2018, Viking Air's holding company, Longview Aviation Capital, announced the acquisition of the Dash 8 and Q400 program, the last DHC designs still held by Bombardier, along with the rights to the DHC name and trademark. The deal, which closed on 3 June 2019 following regulatory approval, brought the entire Canadian de Havilland product line under the same banner for the first time since 2006, under a new holding company named De Havilland Aircraft of Canada Limited. In addition, the company has acquired the Canadair CL-415 program to produce the DHC-515.

== History ==
=== Original company (1928–1986) ===
The de Havilland Canada name was originally used by the de Havilland Aircraft of Canada, Limited, which was established as a subsidiary of de Havilland Aircraft (UK) in 1928. It was first located at De Lesseps Field in Toronto, before moving to Downsview in 1929. The company was founded to build Moth aircraft for the training of Canadian airmen.

Following the Second World War, de Havilland Canada began to build its own designs uniquely suited to the harsh Canadian operating environment. The company also continued production of several British de Havilland aircraft and later produced a licence-built version of the American-designed Grumman S2F Tracker. In 1962 the Avro Canada aircraft production facility was transferred to de Havilland Canada by their then-merged parent company, UK-based Hawker Siddeley.

In the 1980s, the Government of Canada privatized DHC and in 1986 sold the aircraft company to then Seattle-based Boeing. Boeing discontinued several popular product lines including the DHC-6 Twin Otter and the DHC-7 Dash 7, before putting the company up for sale. DHC was eventually acquired by Montreal-based Bombardier Aerospace in 1992 and incorporated into the Bombardier group of companies. During this time, the Dash 8 line remained in production, with the product line being expanded to four models, with the largest being the Q-400.

=== Purchase of Type Certificates ===
On 24 February 2006, Viking Air of Victoria purchased the type certificates from Bombardier Aerospace for all the original de Havilland designs, including:

- DHC-1 Chipmunk
- DHC-2 Beaver
- DHC-3 Otter
- DHC-4 Caribou
- DHC-5 Buffalo
- DHC-6 Twin Otter
- DHC-7 Dash 7

The ownership of the certificates gave Viking the exclusive right to manufacture new aircraft; previously, Viking had purchased in May 2005 the right to manufacture spares and distribute the de Havilland heritage aircraft product line.

In addition to the de Havilland type certificates, Viking Air also acquired the Canadair CL-415 program in October 2018.

=== Formation ===
In November 2018, Viking Air parent Longview Aviation Capital acquired the Bombardier Dash 8 program and the de Havilland brand from Bombardier, in a deal that was expected to close by the second half of 2019. In January 2019, Longview announced that it would establish a new company in Ontario, De Havilland Aircraft of Canada Limited, to continue production of the Q400 model and support the Dash 8 range. The deal closed on 3 June 2019; the newly formed company inherited an order book of 51 Q400s. Longview did not intend to merge Viking Air and De Havilland. Some 1200 Bombardier staff transferred to the new De Havilland company, which intended to continue Dash 8-400 production at Downsview until a lease expires in 2023 and hopes to negotiate an extension to that date. Other Dash 8 variants are also under consideration, in particular to target the North American 50-seater market.

In 2019, the company acquired the Short C-23 Sherpa. DHC currently has interest in restarting the program for the defense and firefighting markets, and is looking to the feasibility of doing so.

In February 2022, Longview consolidated its activities, with Viking Air, Longview Aviation, Pacific Sky Training, De Havilland Canada, and Longview Aviation Capital itself all being rebranded as De Havilland Aircraft of Canada. In June 2022, after a celebration with 10 DHC types present, from a 1942 Tiger Moth to a 2019 DHC-8-400, the last DHC aircraft left the Downsview site and the offices were relocated to nearby Mississauga.

In September 2022, DHC announced its plans to construct a new manufacturing facility, De Havilland Field, in Wheatland County, Alberta. The new facility is intended to merge its two manufacturing facilities and produce the Twin Otter and Dash 8 planes, as well as DHC-515 firefighting aircraft. The new site broke ground in May 2026.

== Aircraft ==
Product list and details
Aircraft	Purpose	Capacity	First flight	Span of production	Number built
DHC-6 Twin Otter	STOL utility aircraft	Two crew and 20 passengers	1965	1966–1988 (original DHC) 2008–present (Viking and DHC)	160 (844 by the original DHC)
Dash 8	Turboprop regional airliner	Two or three crew and 37 to 90 passengers	1983	1984–2021 (original DHC and Bombardier) c. 2028 (DHC)	0 (1,100 by the original DHC and Bombardier)
De Havilland Canadair 515	Turboprop firefighting aircraft	Two crew, additional passenger capacity optional	TBD	c. 2025 (DHC)	0 (95 CL-415s by Canadair)

The company also owns the type certificates for aircraft produced by the original de Havilland Canada and the Short C-23 Sherpa.

== De Havilland Field ==
In 2022, the company announced intention to build De Havilland Field, an aircraft production facility, in Wheatland County, Alberta to replace the previous sites including the one at Downsview Airport. It was intended that the new facility would be built just east of Cheadle. The press release signalled that the facility would initially manufacture the DHC-515 fire-fighting aircraft; the DHC-6 Twin Otter and the Dash 8-400 will also be assembled at De Havilland Field. Construction started on De Havilland Field on 15 May 2026.

== See also ==
- Learjet
- List of civil aircraft
- List of STOL aircraft
- Shorts
