= Beriev Be-200 =

Multipurpose amphibious aircraft

Be-200 Altair
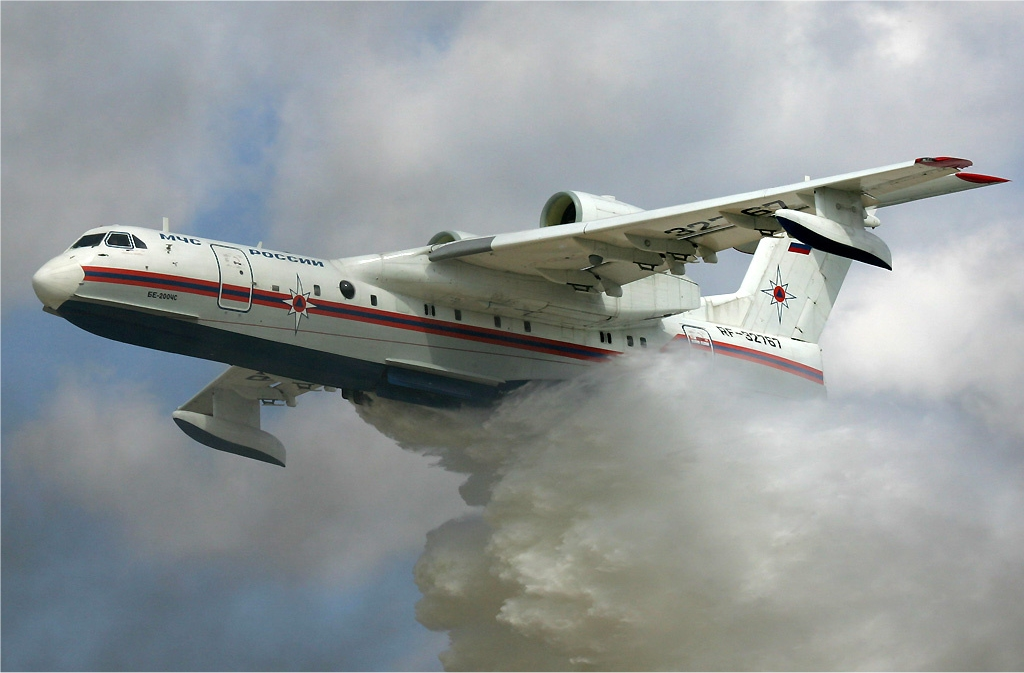
- Be-200ChS

General information
- Type: Multirole amphibious aircraft
- National origin: Russia
- Manufacturer: Taganrog Beriev plant
- Designer: Beriev Aircraft Company
- Status: In service, In production
- Primary user: EMERCOM
- Number built: 20

History
- Introduction date: 31 July 2003 (23 years ago)
- First flight: 24 September 1998
- Developed from: Beriev A-40

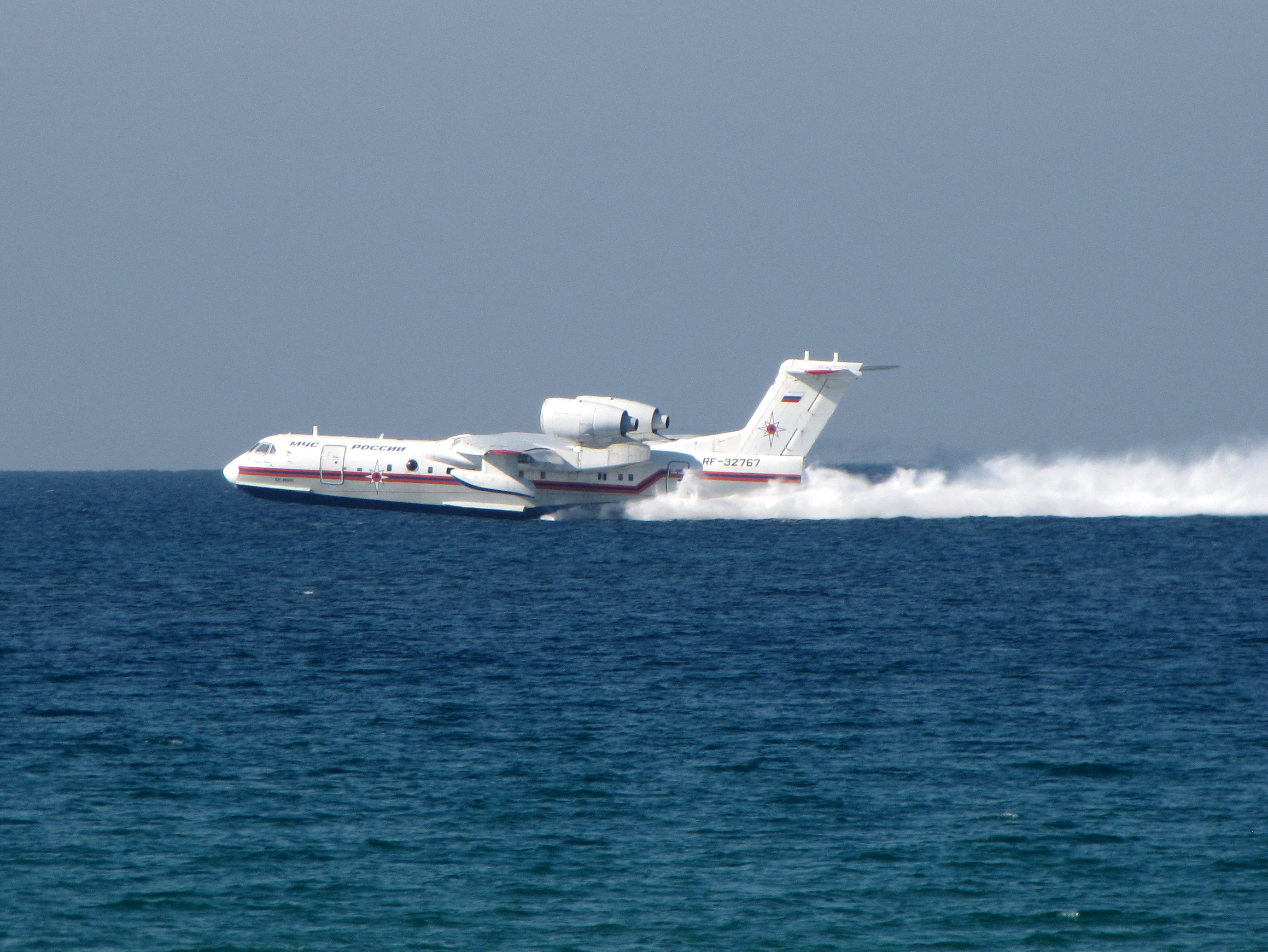
Beriev Be-200 filling water tanks in the Mediterranean Sea while in operation during the 2010 Mount Carmel forest fire

The Beriev Be-200 Altair (Russian: Бериев Бе-200 «Альтаир») is a jet-powered amphibious flying boat of utility type designed and built by the Beriev Aircraft Company. Marketed as being designed for fire fighting, search and rescue, maritime patrol, cargo, and passenger transportation, it has a capacity of 12,000 litres (3,200 US gal) of water, or up to 72 passengers.

The name Altair was chosen after a competition amongst Beriev and Irkut staff in 2002–2003 as a reference to the name of the alpha star in the Eagle constellation and because "Al" is the first part of the name of the Beriev A-40 Albatross amphibious aircraft, whose layout was the development basis for the creation of the Be-200; "ta" stands for Taganrog, while "ir" stands for Irkutsk.

== Development ==
Initiated in 1989 under the design leadership of Alexander Yavkin, to meet a perceived need for a civilian flying boat smaller than Beriev's military A-40, the Be-200 shares a similar layout to the A-40 but is about half the weight. Russian government approval for a purpose-designed water bomber was granted on 8 December 1990. Details of the project were announced, and a model displayed at the 1991 Paris Air Show.

In Perestroika-era Russia, Beriev needed funds to develop the new aircraft, and turned to the Irkutsk Aircraft Production Association (now part of the Irkut Corporation), which was looking to diversify into civilian projects, to help to develop and build the Be-200. Beriev was responsible for development, design and documentation; systems-, static-, flight- and fatigue-testing of prototypes; certification and support of the production models. Irkut's duties comprised production preparation; manufacture of tooling; production of four prototypes and production aircraft; and spare parts manufacture. Both companies now fall under the umbrella of the state-owned United Aircraft Corporation, which in turn is over 92% owned by Russia's state-owned aviation giant Rostec.

Beriev developed unique fire-fighting equipment for the Be-200, allowing it to scoop water while skimming the water surface at 90-95% of takeoff speed. This system was developed using a specially modified Be-12P, coded '12 Yellow'. After installation of the fire-fighting system, the aircraft was registered RA-00046 and given the designation Be-12P-200. This modified Be-12 was used to develop both the fire-fighting system and methods of operation.

The Be-200's first flight from land was scheduled for 1997, but was eventually achieved by the first prototype aircraft on 24 September 1998. The aircraft was then transferred from Irkutsk to Taganrog after 26.5 flying hours, and the first take off from water was conducted on 10 September 1999 in Taganrog. The second Be-200 flew on 27 August 2002. This aircraft was built as a Be-200ES, being fitted to the specifications of the launch customer, EMERCOM, the Russian Ministry of Emergency Situations.

In 2001, as part of a marketing program, the Be-200 was displayed at two large exhibitions in the Pacific Ocean region; the International Maritime and Aerospace Exhibition LIMA'01 in Malaysia and the Korean Aerospace and Defence Exhibition KADE'01 in South Korea.

In 2002, the Be-200 participated in international aviation exhibitions, successfully demonstrating its capabilities to potential customers in France and Greece with 15 demonstration flights made from land, eight from water. A total of over 7,600 kilometres (4,700 mi; 4,100 nmi) was flown across Europe.

Irkut and EADS signed a memorandum of understanding in May 2002 to jointly carry out a market study and to define the conditions and costs of international certification and the logistics of setting up a worldwide after-sales service. The study was completed in July 2003, revealing a potential market for up to 320 aircraft over 20 years. The two companies, with Rolls-Royce Deutschland, planned to obtain Western certification during 2008—2009 and offer a Rolls-Royce BR715 powered aircraft for Western markets. This version was to be given the designation Be-200RR. The original Be-200 prototype (RF-21511) was earmarked to be converted into the Be-200RR prototype. However, efforts were discontinued toward a Rolls-Royce version since a joint study concluded in 2004 that because the intended BR715 engine would require extensive redevelopment due to weight and salt-water corrosion issues, break-even would require sales of too many aircraft.

The first production aircraft was delivered to EMERCOM on 31 July 2003. Seven other production-standard aircraft were then built between 2003 and 2011. From this total of eight aircraft, EMERCOM got six and Azerbaijan one, with one aircraft (as well as the prototype) staying with the manufacturer.

In 2010, the decision was made to switch production to the Centre of competence for amphibian aircraft and flying boats in Taganrog. An assembly line was set up using tooling and equipment received from Irkut's main manufacturing site in Irkutsk, Siberia. This allowed the Irkut Corporation to concentrate on other more lucrative projects. Production of the Be-200 remained under the umbrella of the United Aircraft Corporation. The first Taganrog-built aircraft was delivered in early 2017. A total of ten serial Be-200s have been built at Taganrog, including six Be-200ChS constructed for EMERCOM (which were commissioned from 2016 to 2018), three Be-200s (one Be-200ChS and two Be-200PS) for Russian Naval Aviation (which were commissioned in 2020–2021), and one Be-200ChS ordered for Algeria which was unveiled prior to flight tests in late December 2022 and delivered on 21 May 2023.

In April 2018, months after Ukraine banned deliveries of Progress D-436 aircraft engines to Russia as a consequence of the Annexation of Crimea by the Russian Federation, Safran and UEC Saturn agreed to re-engine the Be-200 with the PowerJet SaM146 from the Sukhoi Superjet. The hope was that the more-modern SaM146 engine, which passed international certification and complies with prospective ICAO requirements, would allow the aircraft to be more fully introduced to the European and American markets. In April 2019, Russia's ministry of industry and trade objected to the Be-200ChS-146 project because the new engines contained components from NATO countries. The project was apparently only suspended and not cancelled, though Russian certification of the re-engined aircraft was pushed to November 2021. Regardless, international sanctions imposed in the wake of the 2022 Russian invasion of Ukraine prohibit sale, supply, transfer or export of aircraft and aircraft parts and technology to Russian entities.

Russian Prime Minister Mikhail Mishustin called for state-owned Rostec to accelerate work on its PD-8 jet engine, derivative of the PD-14 engine, and for the PD-8 to be used on the Be-200 as well as the Sukhoi Superjet and Il-212. On 5 June 2026, type certification for the PD-8 was granted by the Russian Federal Air Transport Agency.

An additional complication for the Be-200 program occurred overnight on 8–9 March 2024, when the aircraft's Taganrog Beriev manufacturing facility, which also repairs Beriev A-50 early warning aircraft, suffered damage possibly from a Ukrainian drone strike.

== Design ==
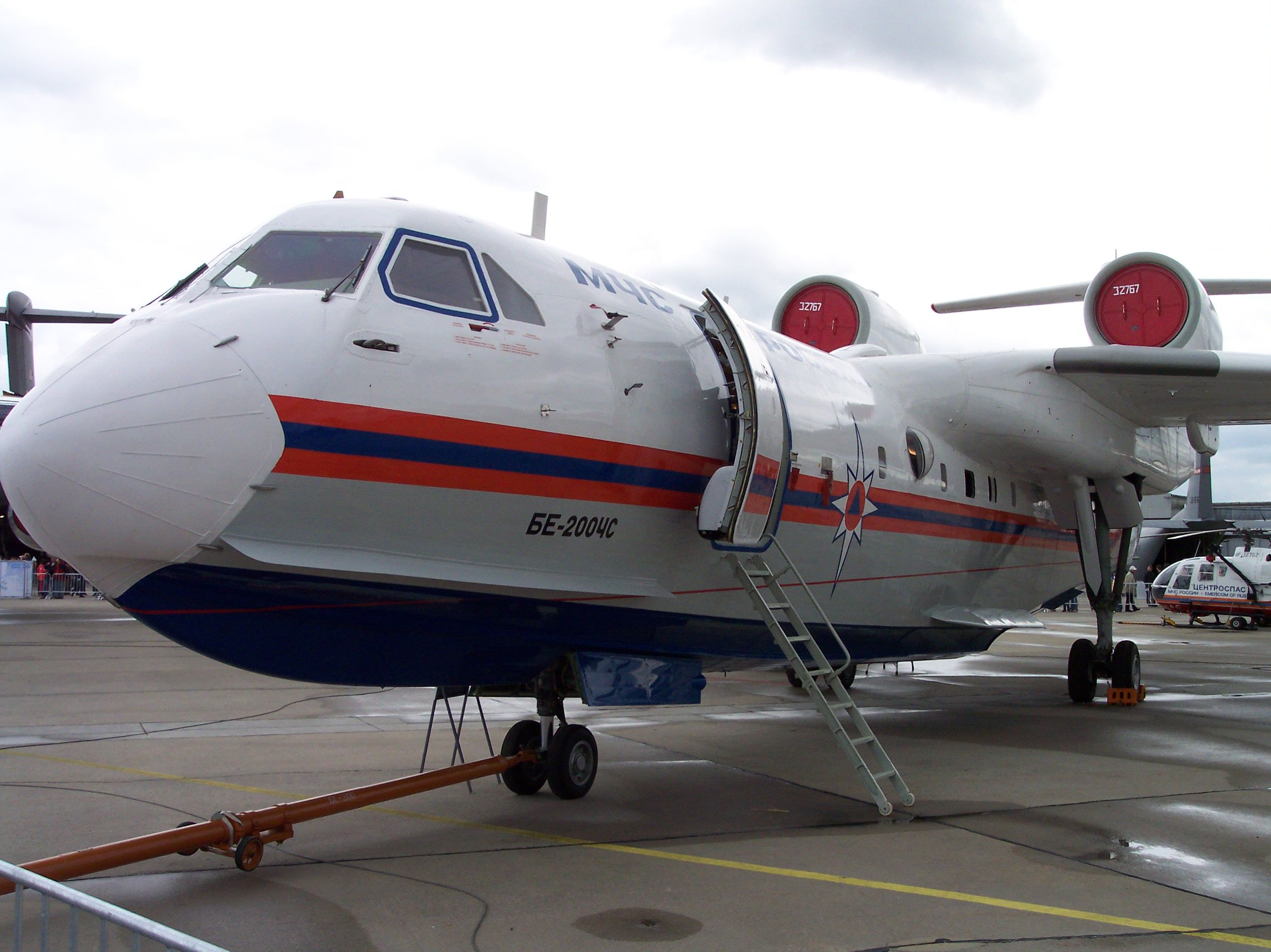
The Be-200's engines are located high and to the rear in order to keep them clear of spray.

The Be-200 is a T-tailed high-wing monoplane. The hull is of single step design with a high length-to-beam ratio, which contributes to stability and controllability in water. The Be-200 airframe is constructed of aluminium alloys with corrosion-protection treatments. Selective use is made of titanium, composites and other corrosion-free materials. The wings are fitted with underwing stabiliser floats. The hydraulically operated retractable landing gear units all retract rearward, and each unit is twin-wheeled. A water rudder provides steering when in the water. It can operate from either a 1,800 m (5,900 ft) long runway or an area of open water at least 2,300 m (7,500 ft) long and 2.5 m (8.2 ft) deep, with waves of up to 1.3 m (4.3 ft) high.

The aircraft is powered by two, over fuselage, pylon-mounted Progress D-436TP engines. The D-436TP is a specific "maritime" corrosion-resistant version of the D-436 three shaft turbofan engine, designed especially for the Be-200 amphibian, by Ivchenko Progress ZMKB and manufactured by Motor Sich in Ukraine. These are mounted above the wingroot pods on the landing gear fairings to prevent water spraying into the engines during take-off and landing.

The Digital Flight Control (fly-by-wire) cockpit is fitted with modern navigation systems such as satellite navigation, FMS, autopilot and weather radar. The ARIA 200-M all-weather integrated avionics system, developed by Honeywell with the Moscow Research Institute of Aircraft Equipment, uses six 152 x 203 mm (6 x 8 in) LCDs to display information to the crew of two.

The multirole Be-200 can be configured as an amphibious water drop fire-fighting aircraft, a freighter, or as a passenger aircraft—the pressurised and air conditioned cabin allowing transportation of up to 72 passengers. The Be-200 can also be equipped for special missions. When configured as an air ambulance, the aircraft can carry up to 30 stretcher patients and seven seated patients or medical crew. In the search and rescue role, the aircraft can be equipped with searchlights and sensors, an inflatable boat, thermal and optical surveillance systems, and medical equipment. The search and rescue variant can accommodate up to 45 people. The aircraft is also capable of being configured for anti-submarine warfare duties.

The Be-200 in amphibious water drop fire-fighter configuration suppresses fires by dropping water contained in eight ferric aluminium alloy water tanks, located under the cabin floor in the centre fuselage section. Four retractable water scoops, two forward and two aft of the fuselage step, can be used to scoop a total of 12 tonnes (26,000 lb) of water in 14 seconds. Alternatively, the tanks can be filled from a hydrant or a water cistern on the ground. The water tanks can be removed quickly for carrying cargo. Water can be dropped in a single salvo, or in up to eight consecutive drops. The aircraft also carries six auxiliary tanks for fire-retarding chemical agents, with a total capacity of 1.2 m^{3} (320 US gal). The aircraft can empty its water tanks over the site of a fire in 0.8 to 1.0 seconds when flying above the minimum drop speed of 220 km/h (140 mph; 120 kn)

== Operational history ==
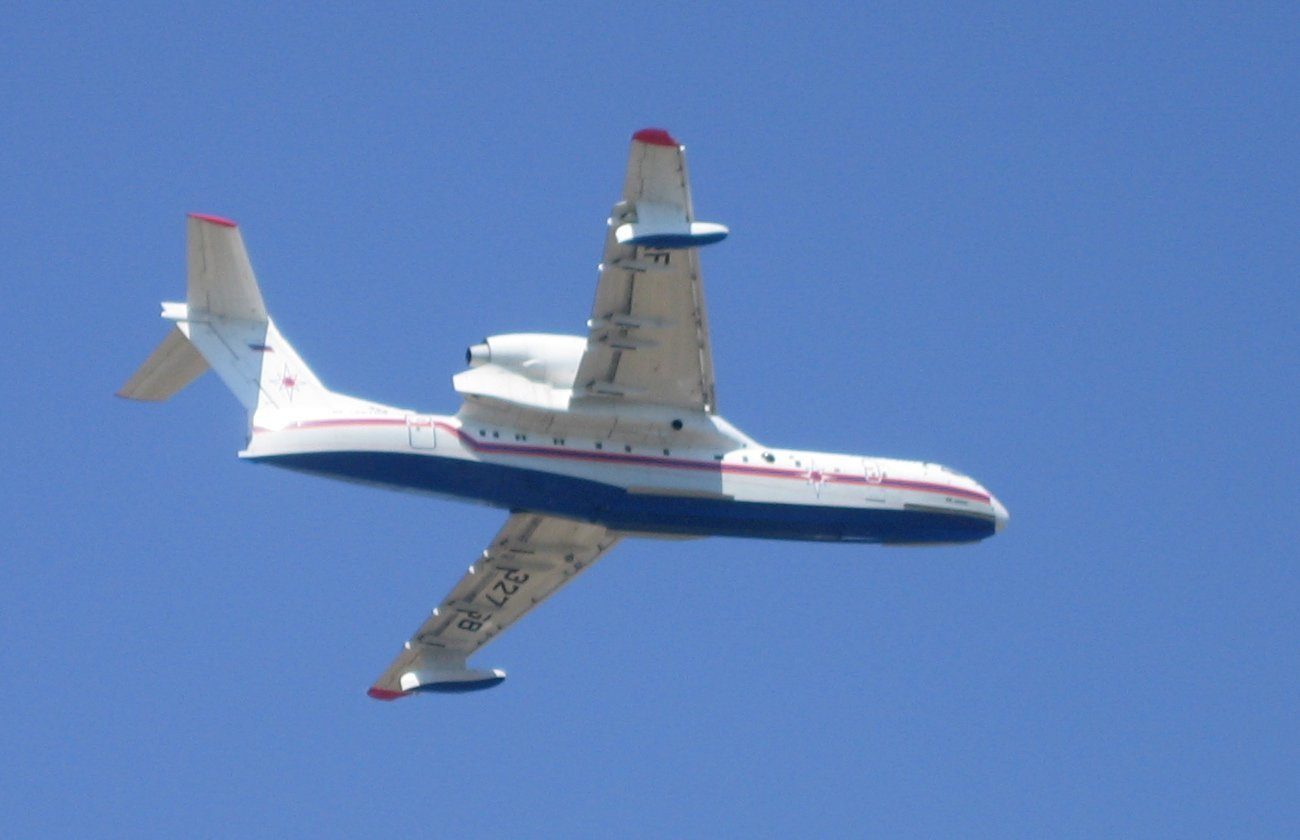
The Be-200 was operated in Greece during fires in the summer of 2007, but has yet to secure any firm orders from Europe.

The first documented operational use of the Be-200 was from 20 August – 30 September 2004. For this period a Be-200ES was operated from Sardinia (Italy) by SOREM, the official operator of fire-fighting equipment of Italian Civil Defense Department (Protezione Civile). The aircraft, flown by joint Russian-Italian flight crew performed more than 100 flights with about 90 hours flown. During seven hours of operational flights, the aircraft participated in the extinguishing of four forest fires and dropped 294 metric tons (324 short tons).

The partnership was renewed in 2005, with Be-200ES (RF-21512) based at Sardinia between July and September. The aircraft flew 150 hours covering 63 missions, including ferry flights, and 435 scoops and drops of water, the total mass of which exceeded 3,175 metric tons (3,500 short tons).

In 2006, aircraft (RF-21512) was again leased by the Portuguese Fire Fighting Services (SNBPC – Serviço Nacional de Bombeiros e Protecção Civil) for evaluation during the forest fire season. On 6 July 2006, the Russian crew of the Be-200 leased by Portugal were carrying out a water pick-up from the Aguieira dam near Santa Comba Dão, when on climbing away they clipped treetops and at least one of the Progress D-436TP engines suffered ingestion damage and had to be shut down. The aircraft recovered safely to land at Monte Real air force base, from which it had been operating. After repairs, the aircraft completed the season in Portugal. In total, 42 flights were performed during operations in Portugal, with a total flying time of 119 hours. The aircraft performed 301 water scooping operations and dropped 2,167 metric tons (2,389 short tons) of water on fires.

In October 2006, two Be-200ES (RF-32765 and RF-32768) were leased to Indonesia by EMERCOM, fighting fires for 45 days. This reportedly cost Indonesia around US$5,200,000 (equivalent to $8,304,721 in 2025). These operations prompted press reports that the Indonesian government had agreed to purchase two Be-200s, each with a projected price of US$40,000,000 (equivalent to $63,882,469 in 2025). Beriev, however has not confirmed these reports.

Such was the success of the first campaign that two Be-200ES were again leased by Portugal from 10 July – 30 September 2007. During this period 58 fire-fighting flights were conducted with a total flying time of over 167 hours. 2,322 metric tons (2,560 short tons) of water was dropped. Beriev claims that representatives of the newly formed Portuguese government enterprise EMA (Empresa de Meios Aéreos) have expressed their interest in a long-term cooperation with Beriev and the Be-200 in Portugal.

Two Be-200ES also operated in Greece, RF-32768 fighting the 2007 forest fires for the whole season and RF-21512 from 30 August – 13 September 2007.

In April 2008, Azerbaijan became the first foreign customer for the Be-200, purchasing one Be-200ES from Russia. The aircraft (FHN-10201, formerly RF-32768) is operated by the Azerbaijan Ministry of Emergency Situations and can be operated as a fire-fighting, cargo and 43-seater passenger aircraft.

In July—August 2010 it was used in Russia during the wildfires that spread across the country.

In early December 2010, two Be-200ES aircraft were used to fight the 2010 Mount Carmel forest fire near Haifa, Israel.

In Serbia one Be-200 belonging to Russian Ministry of Emergency Situations is stationed in summer on Niš Constantine the Great Airport. Aircraft has already operational history in 2012 and 2013.

A Be-200 was dispatched by Russia in January 2015 to assist in search and recovery operations following the loss of Indonesia AirAsia Flight 8501 in the Java Sea. On 20 October 2015, two Be-200s were used by the Indonesian government to fight a forest fire in Sumatra.

In August 2016 two Be-200 aircraft were sent to Portugal after being asked for help in extinguishing forest fires. One sustained minor damage during a drop near Leiria, Portugal when it hit treetops. Four days later it was reported that thanks to the work of the Russian Emergencies Ministry Be-200 pilots, the fire was prevented from spreading in the direction of two settlements-- Castro Laboreiro with a population of 1,000 people; Viaden de Baixo, where 15 farms were saved from fire; and, Peneda-Gerês National Park.

A Chinese entity called Leader Energy Aircraft Manufacturing Co. ordered two Be-200s, with an option for two more, at the Zhuhai Airshow in 2016. The contract was signed in June 2017. At that time, there was talk by the Director General of the Taganrog facility of moving production entirely to China. However, the 2017 contract was never completed.

A firm called International Emergency Services ("IES"), housed at the Santa Maria Public Airport in California, US tried since at least 2009 to bring the Be-200 to the United States in its fire-fighting role. An organization called the USA Firefighting Air Corps ("USAFAC") said in September 2014 that it had signed a collaboration agreement with IES to develop a U.S.-assembled Be-200 in Colorado. However, the USAFAC website address was simply parked by late 2021, and the Colorado Secretary of State records show USAFAC has expired. There was also discussion at a Santa Maria Public Airport District meeting in October 2016 of IES, Seaplane Global Air Services ("SGAS") and Airbus partnering to build the aircraft at the Santa Maria airport. Regardless, there was no concrete on-the-ground result from this proposal. Meanwhile, in September 2018, SGAS ordered from the manufacturer four Be-200ES aircraft with an option for six more. The first two aircraft were to be equipped with D-436TP engines, the eight others with the SaM146 engines. According to some reports, SGAS had plans to wet- and dry-lease the water-bombers in partnership with IES, offering services in several countries, including the US, European nations, and Australia. However, by March 2022, the IES website address lead only to a page marked: "Account Suspended," and the California Secretary of State website showed International Emergency Services as terminated. No aircraft were ever manufactured for SGAS, and as of September 2024, the status of SGAS was shown on the California Secretary of State website as "Forfeited."

In June–October 2020, Be-200ESs were extensively used to provide fire-fighting service in Turkey. During the summer of 2021 one aircraft was used in Greece.

The Be-200's European certification was revoked on 14 March 2022. The Greek government then began planning to address the upcoming fire season without use of any Be-200 aircraft.

In February 2023, the EMERCOM dispatched a Be-200 to extinguish a large fire at the Turkish Iskenderun port, which began after a powerful earthquake hit Turkey and Syria.

== Accidents and incidents ==
On 8 August 2021, a Be-200 that was leased by Turkey from Russia to participate in the fight against the 2021 Turkish wildfires arrived in Turkey. On 14 August, it crashed near the city of Adana, killing all 8 personnel on board including 5 Russian servicemen and 3 Turkish citizens.

On 11 April 2024, it was reported that a Be-200 belonging to the Russian Navy had been hit in a Ukrainian drone strike at the Yeysk Airport, the home of the 859th Centre for Combat Application and Crew Training for Naval Aviation of Russian Naval Aviation. At minimum it is claimed that the left wing console was damaged, and a fuel leak resulted.

On 15 May 2026 a Be-200 was destroyed in a Ukrainian drone attack at the Yeysk Airport, Krasnodar oblast.

== Variants ==
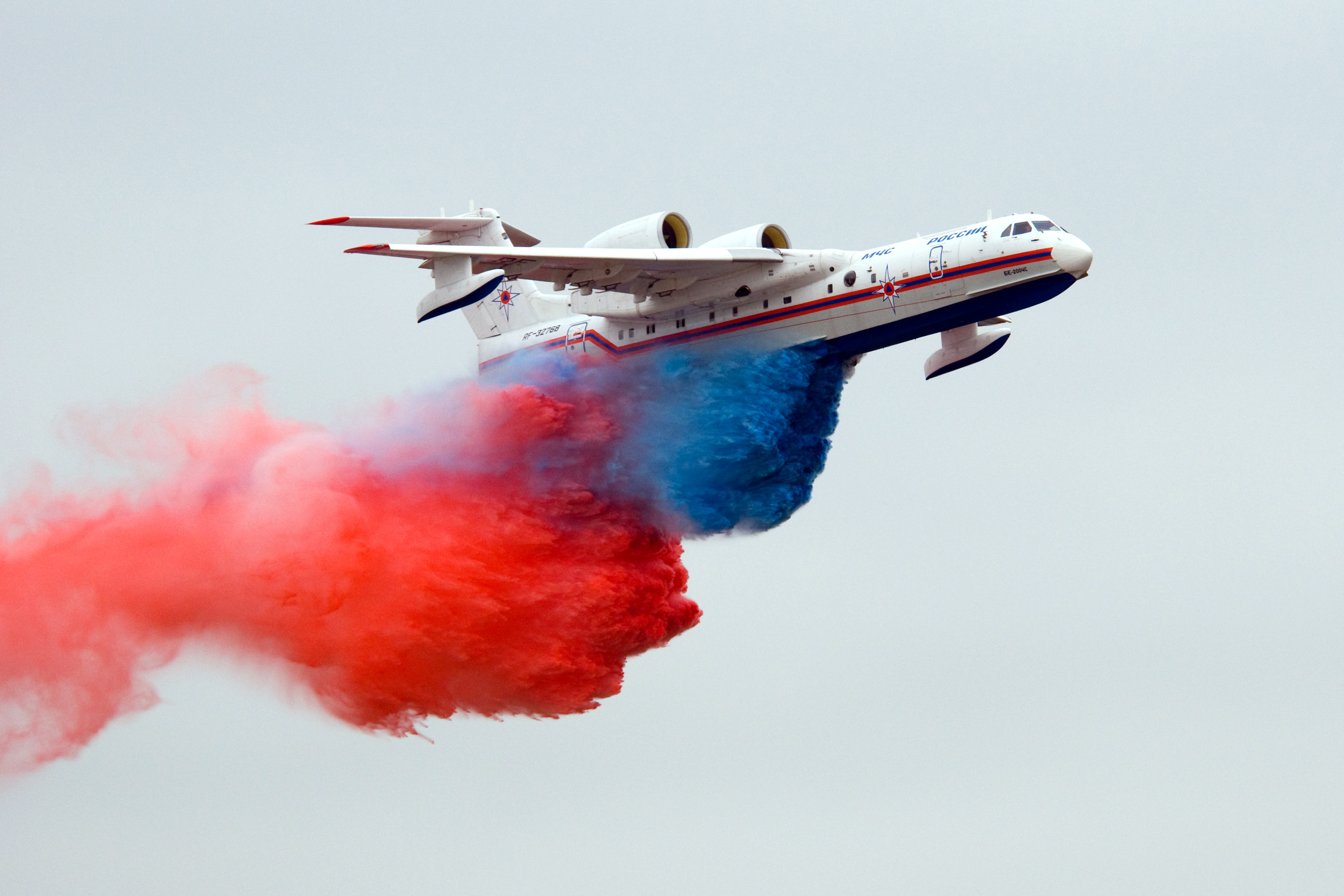
Be-200ChS at the 10th edition of the MAKS Airshow

Be-200
Basic multirole model
Be-200ChS/Be-200ES
Multirole model fitted to the requirements of the Russian Ministry of Emergency Situations
Be-200E
English cockpit version of the Be-200ES
Be-200RR
Projected Rolls-Royce engined variant, since shelved
Be-210
Projected passenger-only model
Be-220
Projected maritime patrol variant
Be-200ChS-146
Projected SaM146-powered variant, since shelved because the Russian war against Ukraine shut off the supply of SaM146 engine parts from French-based manufacturer Safran.

== Operators ==
Algeria

- Algerian Ministry of Defence – Two Be-200ES units delivered from a total of four Be-200s on order with the option for two or four more.

Azerbaijan

- Ministry of Emergency Situations – One Be-200ES in inventory.

Russia

- Beriev – One Be-200 (RA-21511) and one Be-200ChS (RA-21512). As of 2019, RA-21511 remains stored at the Beriev manufacturing plant in Taganrog and RA-21512 is in active use.
- Ministry of Emergency Situations – ordered eight Be-200ESs in 2010. It had twelve Be-200ESs in inventory with seven flight-worthy and ordered two more as of December 2020.
- Ministry of Defence – ordered three Be-200s in 2018. The first one was delivered in 2020.

=== Possible future operators ===
Chile

- Asesorias CBP Ltda – Two Be-200s on order and five options. The planes, when not used for firefighting, were intended to shuttle passengers from the Valparaíso Cruise Terminal to San Juan Bautista, the main town and capitol of the Juan Fernandez Islands, a visit to which otherwise requires a 1.5 hour ride by motor launch just between the town and the island's airport. Deliveries were expected in 2020. As of 2023, an article on the company's website from March 2019 indicated two Be-200 aircraft "will arrive" in Chile in 2021, but nothing on the website suggests the aircraft were ever delivered. Also by 2023, no aircraft had actually been manufactured for Chile.

== Specifications (Be-200) ==
Beriev Be-200 3-view drawing

Data from Irkut Website and EADS-Irkut Seaplane Website

General characteristics

- Crew: 5
- Capacity: 44 pax Be-200ES / 72 pax Be-210 / 7,500 kg (16,500 lb) cargo payload / 12,000 kg (26,000 lb) water or retardant
- Length: 32 m (105 ft 0 in)
- Wingspan: 32.8 m (107 ft 7 in)
- Height: 8.9 m (29 ft 2 in)
- Wing area: 117.4 m^{2} (1,264 sq ft)
- Airfoil: root: TsAGI 16%; tip: TsAGI 11.5%
- Empty weight: 27,600 kg (60,848 lb)
- Max takeoff weight: 41,000 kg (90,390 lb) (land)
- Max Take Off Weight (Water): 37,900 kg (83,600 lb)
- Powerplant: 2 × Progress D-436TP turbofan engines, 73.55 kN (16,534 lbf) thrust each

Performance

- Maximum speed: 700 km/h (430 mph, 380 kn)
- Cruise speed: 560 km/h (350 mph, 300 kn) * Economy cruise speed: 550 km/h (340 mph; 300 kn)
- Landing speed: 200 km/h (120 mph; 110 kn)
- Takeoff speed: 220 km/h (140 mph; 120 kn)
- Minimum speed (Flaps 38°): 157 km/h (98 mph; 85 kn)
- Range: 2,100 km (1,300 mi, 1,100 nmi)
- Ferry range: 3,300 km (2,100 mi, 1,800 nmi) with 1 hour reserve
- Service ceiling: 8,000 m (26,000 ft)
- Rate of climb: 13 m/s (2,600 ft/min) at Sea Level, MTOW and Flaps 20°

17 m/s (55.8 ft/s) at Sea Level, MTOW and Flaps 0°

Avionics
ARIA 200-M integrated avionics system, developed by Moscow Research Institute of Aircraft Equipment.

== See also ==
Related development

- Beriev A-40

Aircraft of comparable role, configuration, and era

- Canadair CL-415
- ShinMaywa US-2
- AVIC AG600

Related lists

- List of flying boats and floatplanes
