= Progress D-436 =

Soviet turbofan engine

D-436
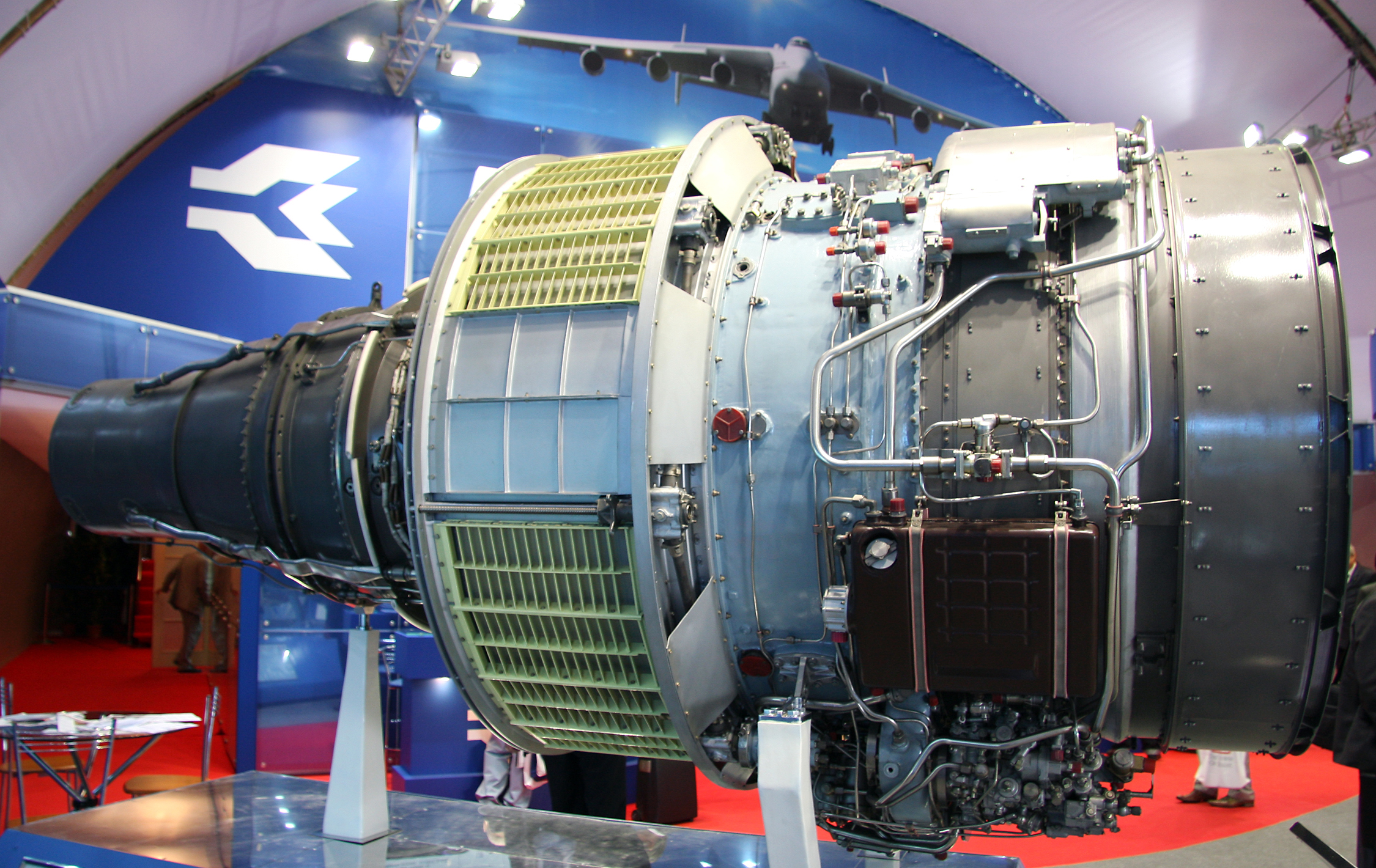
- D-436-148 turbofan engine for An-148
- Type: Turbofan
- National origin: Soviet Union/Ukraine
- Manufacturer: Ivchenko-Progress, UMPO and NPC Saljut
- First run: 1985
- Major applications: Antonov An-148; Tupolev Tu-334; Beriev Be-200
- Developed from: Lotarev D-36

The Progress D-436 is a triple-spool high-bypass turbofan engine developed by the Ukrainian company Ivchenko-Progress during the Soviet era, and manufactured by Motor Sich in Ukraine. It was initially developed to meet the requirements for late versions of the Yakovlev Yak-42 and the Antonov An-74 in the 1980s. The engine first ran in 1985 and was subsequently certified in 1987. Several variants have been developed and are currently in service with a variety of aircraft.

== Design and development ==
The D-436 engine was developed as a follow on to the Lotarev D-36. The engine took several of its design features from that engine and another Progress engine, the Progress D-18. The D-436 incorporated an updated, higher RPM fan, a lower emissions combustor, and new compressor sections. Several variants of the engine incorporate a FADEC.

The Motor-Sich plant in Zaporizhzhia, where the assembly line for D-436 engines was located, was destroyed by Russian forces in late May 2022 following the 2022 Russian invasion of Ukraine.

== Variants ==
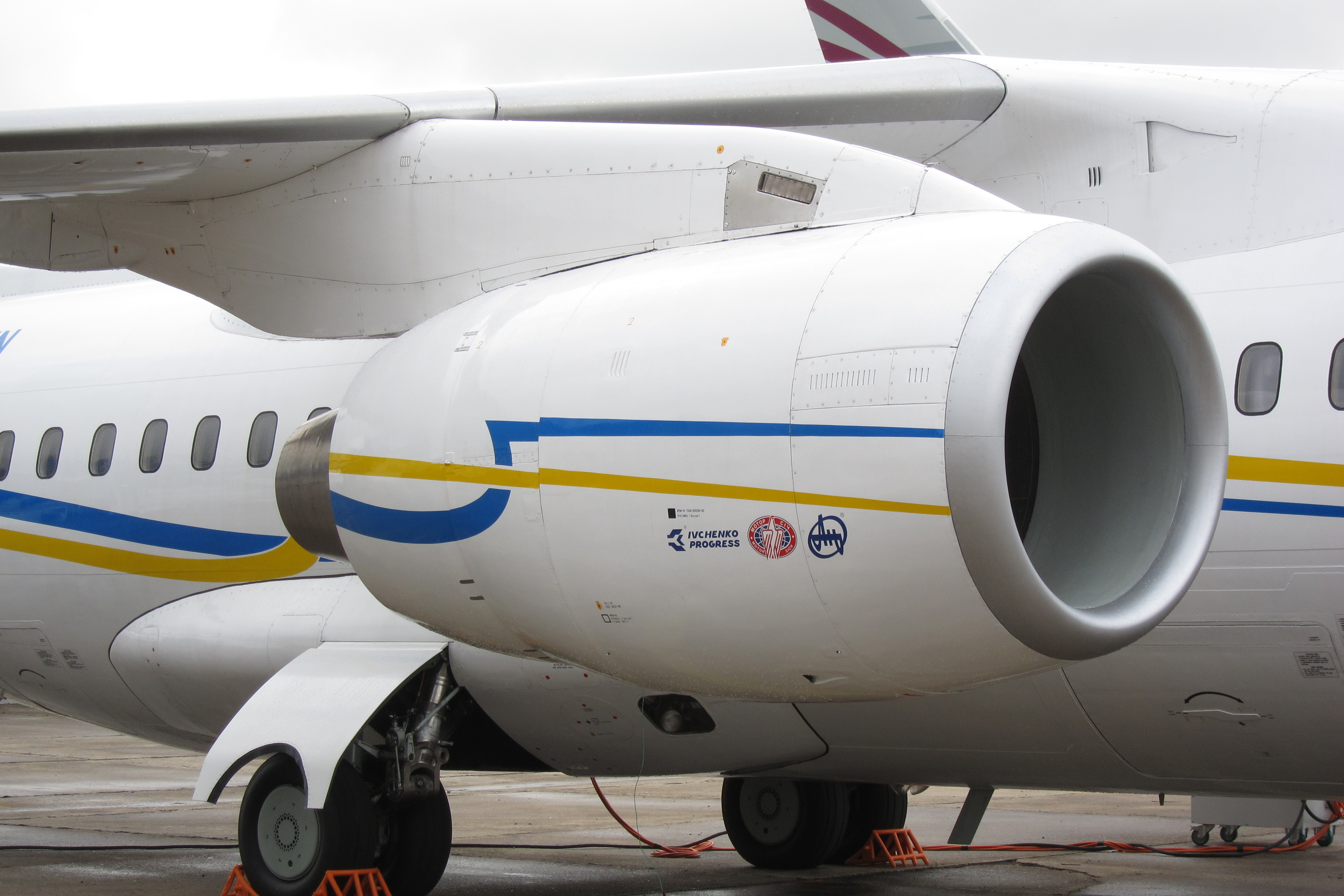
A Progress D-436 installed on an Antonov An-158

D-436K
The "K" variant was the initial model of the engine. It had a bypass ratio of 6.2 and a pressure ratio of 21.0. Proposed for use in the defunct Antonov An-71.
D-436M
The "M" variant was proposed for use on the Yak-42M.
D-436T1
The "T1" variant is used on the Tu-334 and has been offered for use on the in-development Tu-414. See detailed specifications below. The variant was also proposed for use on the now-defunct An-174.
D-436T1-134
The "T1-134" variant was proposed as a replacement for the engines on the Tupolev Tu-134.
D-436T2
The "T2" variant is uprated to 80 kN (18,000 lb_{f}) of thrust and is used on the Tu-334-100D and the Tu-334-200D.
D-436TP
The "TP" variant is a specific "maritime" corrosion-resistant version developed for use in the Be-200 amphibious aircraft. This variant produces 7,500 kgf (16,534 lbf) each.
D-436T3
The "T3" variant added a booster section behind the new wide-chord fan and had a maximum thrust around 93 kN (21,000 lb_{f}). The T3 variant was also considered for the Il-214, but the aircraft's thrust requirements exceeded the max engine thrust of 98 kN (22,000 lbf).
D-436-148
The "-148" variant was developed specifically for the An-148. This version is derated to 67 kN (15,000 lb_{f}) of thrust for longer engine life.
D-436TX
The "TX" variant uses the same core at the "T3", but includes an updated turbine and a geared fan. It is in the 117–135 kN (26,000–30,000 lb_{f}) class.

=== Derivatives ===
AI-436T12
This derivative engine was designed for use on the Irkut/Ilyushin MC-21. It was projected to produce 117 kN (26,000 lb_{f}) of thrust. Irkut has since replaced the AI-436T12 with the 137.89 kN (31,000 lbf) Aviadvigatel PD-14.

== Applications ==
- Antonov An-148
- Antonov An-72/74
- Beriev Be-200
- Tupolev Tu-334
- Yakovlev Yak-42M

== Specifications (D-436-T1) ==
Data from Elodie Roux, page 159

==== General characteristics ====
- Type: Three-spool high-bypass turbofan
- Length: 3.03 m (9 ft 11 in)
- Diameter: 1.373 m (4 ft 6.1 in)
- Dry weight: 1,450 kg (3,200 lb)

==== Components ====
- Compressor: Axial flow, 1-stage fan, 6-stage IP, 7-stage HP
- Turbine: 1-stage HP, 1-stage IP, 3-stage LP

==== Performance ====
- Maximum thrust: Takeoff: 7,650 kgf (16,865 lbf; 75.02 kN); Cruise: 1,500 kgf (3,307 lbf; 14.71 kN) at Mach 0.75 speed, 11,000 m (36,000 ft) altitude
- Overall pressure ratio: 25.2
- Bypass ratio: 4.95
- Air mass flow: 606.3 lb/s (275.0 kg/s)
- Turbine inlet temperature: 1,550 K (2,790 °R; 1,280 °C; 2,330 °F)
- Specific fuel consumption: Takeoff: 10.6 g/(kN⋅s) (0.37 lb/(lbf⋅h)); Cruise: 17.3 g/(kN⋅s) (0.61 lb/(lbf⋅h))

== See also ==
Related development

- Lotarev D-36
- Lotarev D-136
- Progress D-236

Comparable engines

- CFM International CFM56
- General Electric CF34
- IAE V2500
- PowerJet SaM146
- Rolls-Royce BR700

Related lists

- List of aircraft engines
