= Beriev A-40 =

Russian anti-submarine amphibious jet aircraft

A-40 Albatros (Be-42)
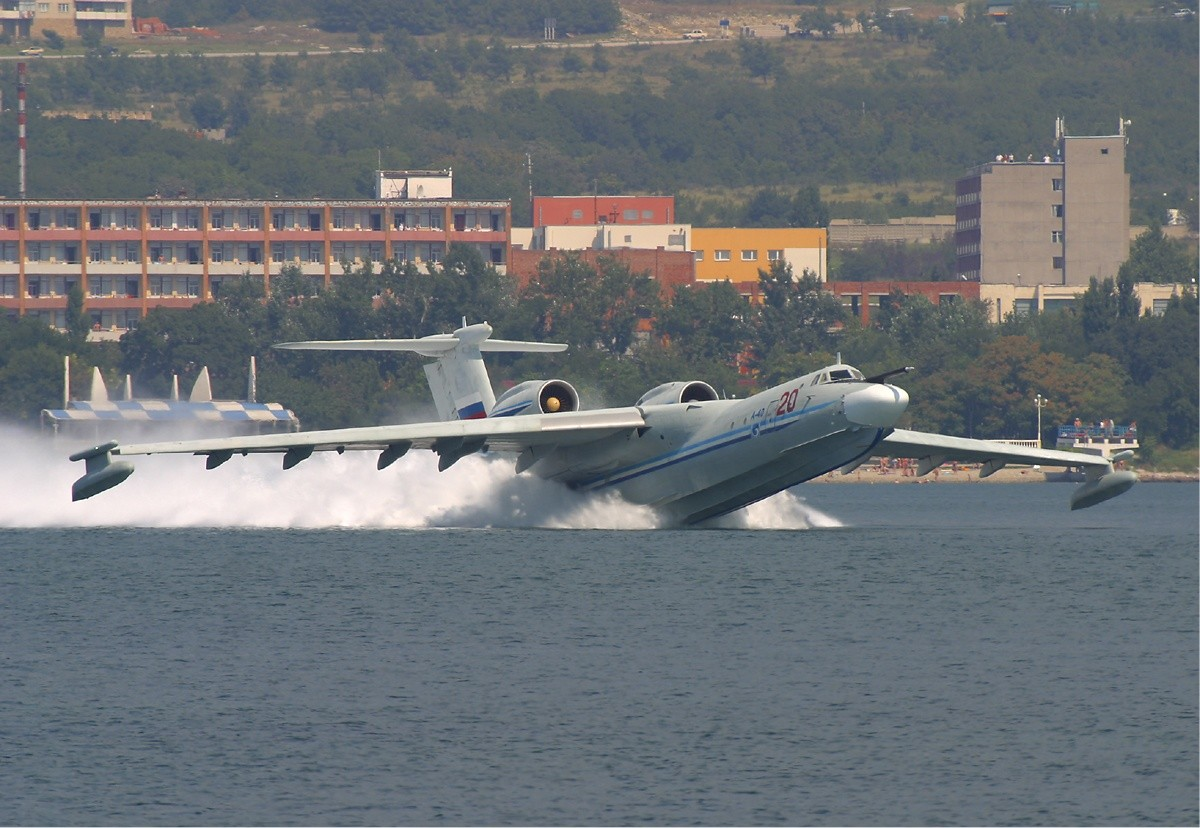
- Beriev A-40 at Gelendzhik, 2004

General information
- Type: ASW amphibious aircraft
- Designer: Beriev Aircraft Company
- Status: In development
- Primary user: Russian Naval Aviation
- Number built: 2 (A-40 and A-42 prototypes)

History
- First flight: 8 December 1986
- Developed into: Beriev Be-200

The Beriev A-40 Albatros (Russian: Бериев А-40 Альбатрос, romanized: Albatros, lit. 'Albatross', NATO reporting name: Mermaid) is a Soviet/Russian jet-powered amphibious flying boat designed by the Beriev Aircraft Company for an anti-submarine warfare role. Intended as a replacement for the amphibious turboprop Beriev Be-12 and the land-based Ilyushin Il-38, the project was suspended after only one prototype had been manufactured, with the second one 70% completed, due to the breakup of the Soviet Union. The project was later revived as the A-42 and an order has been placed by the Russian Navy, though as of 2023, no more has been said of this order, and no other customer has placed orders on the A-40; its successor design, the civilian Be-200, has been marketed more successfully both domestically and in the international market.

== Design ==
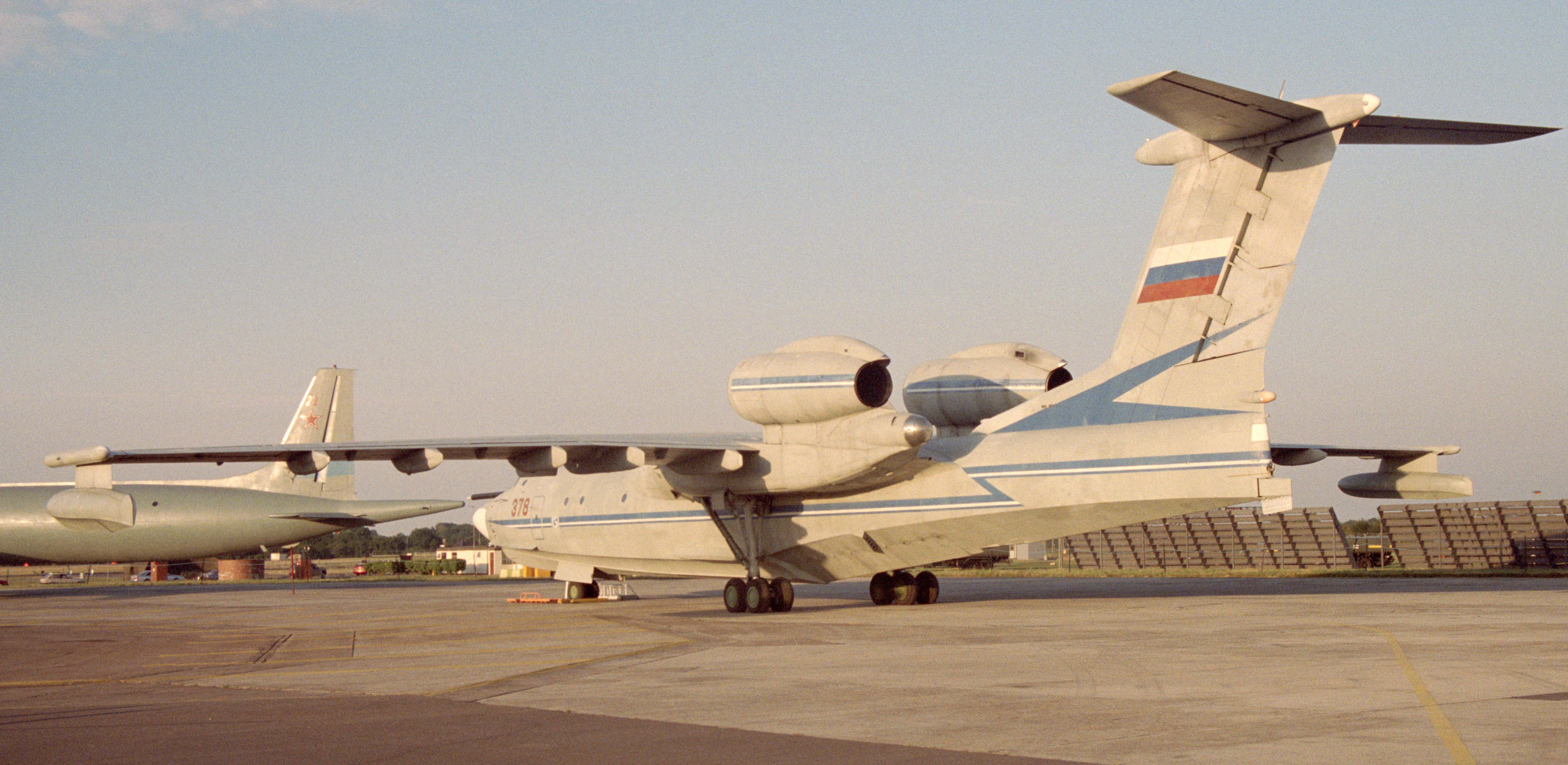
A Beriev A-40 at the 1996 Royal International Air Tattoo at RAF Fairford

The A-40 is a jet-engined flying boat patrol bomber of all-metal construction with the engines located above the wing roots, atop each of the main landing gear nacelles at the rear of each wing root. The swept wings, set high on the fuselage, have a marked anhedral angle, with balance floats attached by short pylons directly under each wingtip.

== Development ==
The maiden flight in 1986 was unplanned; during a high-speed taxi test, the airplane became airborne and ran out of runway, with the crew being forced to continue the takeoff. The subsequent flight and landing went without further incident, but the test crew were downgraded from their duties afterwards, despite having saved the aircraft.

By 1990 two variants were planned, with a search and rescue amphibian being designated the A-42, and a Maritime Patrol version designated as the A-44. The A-42 and A-44 versions were combined in 1993, but work on amphibians came to a halt in that year with an A-42 prototype 80% completed.

In 2002, after renewed Russian Navy interest, the A-40 prototype was restored to airworthiness, and in 2006 the A-42 prototype was completed. The Defense Ministry signed an R&D agreement for $242 million rubles but pulled the plug in 2011.

On 3 September 2019, the Russian Navy announced an order for three A-42 aircraft, with an expectation that the aircraft would use two Progress D-27 propfans, manufactured by Motor Sich in Ukraine, as the powerplant. This variant would have an increased range of 9300 km. This version would be upgraded to expand its combat capabilities, including a new radar comprising a viewing sight, heat seekers, piloting and navigational complex to measure sea waves, and new communications equipment. An estimated service entry date was not provided. Regardless, the Motor Sich engine manufacturing plant in Zaporozhie was destroyed by Russian forces in late May 2022 following the 2022 Russian invasion of Ukraine.

== Operational history ==
Between 1989 and 1998, the Beriev A-40 set 140 world records.

== Variants ==
A-40
Initial ASW amphibian. 1 prototype built (second is 70% completed).

A-40M
Projected upgrade to the initial version, utilising a new search and targeting system.

A-40P
Initially a projected aerial firefighting version, able to scoop 25 tonnes (28 tons) of water and transport a team of firefighters. Later the same designation was used for a projected maritime patrol aircraft in direct competition with the Tupolev Tu-204P.

A-40PM/Be-40P
A projected civil version developed in 1994. Intended to carry 105 passengers, an export version with CFM engines was also offered. These studies led to the development of the Beriev Be-200.

Be-40PT
A projected cargo/passenger version designed to carry 70 passengers, 10 tonnes (11 tons) of cargo or 37 passengers and up to 6.5 tonnes of cargo.

A-42/Be-42
A search and rescue version designed to replace the Beriev Be-12PS, in response to the K-278 disaster. Construction of a prototype began, but was suspended in 1993. Studies are currently being made of a joint A-42/44 multi-role version, fitted with Progress D-27 propfans.

A-44
Maritime patrol version designed in tandem with the A-42 before the projects were merged into a multi-role aircraft in 1993.

A-42PE
Projected maritime patrol and SAR version intended for export. Powered by two Progress D-27 propfans.

== Specifications (A-40) ==
Data from Beriev's Jet Flying Boats

General characteristics

- Crew: 8
- Length: 43.84 m (143 ft 10 in)
- Wingspan: 41.62 m (136 ft 7 in)
- Height: 11 m (36 ft 1 in)
- Wing area: 200 m^{2} (2,200 sq ft)
- Max takeoff weight: 86,000 kg (189,598 lb)
- Powerplant: 2 × Soloviev D-30KPV turbofan engines, 117.7 kN (26,500 lbf) thrust each
- Powerplant: 2 × Rybinsk RD-36-35 turbojet engines, 23 kN (5,200 lbf) thrust each take-off boosters

Performance

- Maximum speed: 800 km/h (500 mph, 430 kn)
- Range: 4,100 km (2,500 mi, 2,200 nmi)
- Service ceiling: 9,700 m (31,800 ft)
- Rate of climb: 30 m/s (5,900 ft/min)
- Take-off run on land: 1,000 m (3,300 ft)
- Take-off run on water: 2,000 m (6,600 ft)
- Landing distance (ground): 700 m (2,300 ft)
- Landing distance (water): 900 m (3,000 ft)

Armament
Projected Armament:

- (A-40P ASW Aircraft, internal bomb bay)
  - Sonobuoys, depth charges, mines, plus;
  - 3 Orlan (Sea Eagle) torpedoes, or
  - 6 Korshun (Kite) guided missiles
- (A-40P ASW Aircraft, underwing pylons)
  - Kh-35 Anti-ship missiles

== See also ==
Related development

- Beriev Be-200

Related lists

- List of flying boats and floatplanes
