= Serhiy Shtepa =

Ukrainian politician

- Сергій Штепа
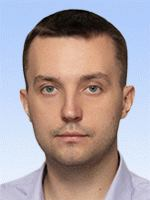
- Official portrait, 2019

People's Deputy of Ukraine
- Incumbent
- Assumed office 29 August 2019
- Preceded by: Vyacheslav Boguslayev
- Constituency: Zaporizhzhia Oblast, No. 77

Personal details
- Born: 30 April 1990 (age 36) Zaporizhzhia, Ukrainian SSR, Soviet Union (now Ukraine)
- Party: Servant of the People
- Other political affiliations: Independent (until 2019)
- Education: Zaporizhzhia National University

Serhiy Serhiyovych Shtepa (Ukrainian: Сергій Сергійович Штепа; born 30 April 1990) is a Ukrainian politician currently serving as a People's Deputy of Ukraine from Ukraine's 77th electoral district as a member of Servant of the People since 2019. Previously, he was a professional freelance photographer and journalist.

== Early life and career ==
Serhiy Serhiyovych Shtepa was born on 30 April 1990 in the city of Zaporizhzhia in southern Ukraine. He is a graduate of the Zaporizhzhia National University, specialising in publishing and editing. Prior to his election, Shtepa was a freelance photographer and journalist. He was organiser of cultural events and photo exhibitions, and taught photography classes to over 400 students, including some from France and Poland.

== Political career ==
In the 2019 Ukrainian parliamentary election, Shtepa was the candidate of Servant of the People for People's Deputy of Ukraine in Ukraine's 77th electoral district. At the time of the election, he was an independent. He was successfully elected, defeating the independent incumbent Vyacheslav Boguslayev with 44.22% of the vote compared to Boguslayev's 31.5%.

In the Verkhovna Rada (Ukraine's parliament), Shtepa joined the Servant of the People faction and the Verkhovna Rada Committee on Digital Transformation, becoming head of the e-government subcommittee. He later became deputy chair of the committee on 5 October 2022. He joined Servant of the People on 10 November 2019. According to anti-corruption non-governmental organisation Chesno, Shtepa has proposed a relatively high number of bills for a People's Deputy from Zaporizhzhia Oblast, though Chesno has also criticised his vote in favour of urban planning reform involving the reconstruction of Ukraine following the 2022 Russian invasion of Ukraine.
