= Progress D-236 =

Propfan engine

D-236
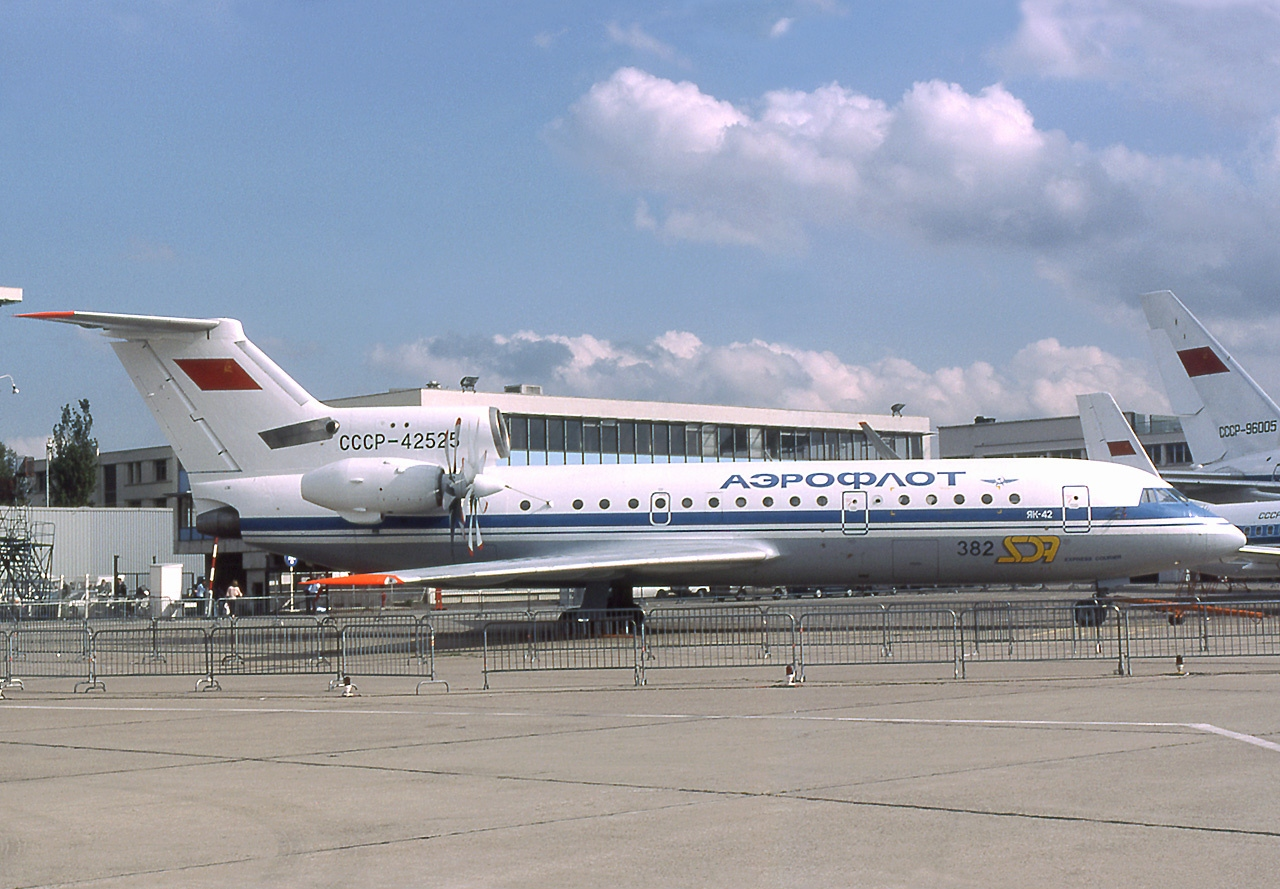
- The Progress D-236 propfan engine attached to the Yak-42E-LL testbed aircraft, on static display at the 1991 Paris Air Show.
- Type: Propfan
- National origin: Ukraine
- Manufacturer: Ivchenko-Progress
- First run: 1985
- Major applications: Tupolev Tu-334; Ilyushin Il-88 and Il-118
- Number built: 5
- Developed from: Lotarev D-136

The Progress D-236 was an experimental aircraft engine, a hybrid between a turbofan and a turboprop known as a propfan. Also known as the Lotarev D-236T, the three-shaft geared engine was designed in the 1980s and 1990s to power proposed propfan aircraft such as the Tupolev Tu-334, Ilyushin Il-118, and Ilyushin Il-88.

Based on the core of the Ukrainian Progress D-36 turbofan, the D-236 was the first Soviet propfan, and as of 2019 it is still one of only four different unshrouded, contra-rotating propfan engines to have flown in service or in flight testing.

== Design and development ==
The D-236, an engine with unshrouded contra-rotating propellers, was first investigated in 1979 as the powerplant for the first version of the Ukrainian Antonov An-70. The front propeller was tested on the Antonov An-32 military transport aircraft in 1980, as the An-32's normal Ivchenko AI-20DM engines had about half the rated power of the D-236. However, the anticipated improvements in takeoff performance and noise reduction did not materialize. The noise at cruise speeds reached 115 to 120 decibels, which was even higher than the noise levels produced by the lighter Aerosila AV-68DM propellers typically attached on the AI-20DM. The increased noise affected radio communications and crew working conditions, so the propeller testing was quickly ended.

An early version of the contra-rotating propellers for the D-236 engine was shown at the Paris Air Show in June 1985. At that time, the propellers had 16 blades with a diameter of 4.56 metres (14.95 ft; 456 cm; 179.4 in). The blades had a glass fiber and carbon fiber composite shell over a metal spar, and they had about 45 degrees of twist. The propellers would rotate at 1,100 rpm at takeoff and 960 rpm at cruise. Soviet engineers claimed that the engine would be delivered by 1989 and help Antonov airliners meet the strictest U.S. community noise standards, although they were still working on a solution to lower cabin noise. The gently curved blades were efficient up to a speed of Mach 0.7, which led some American engineers to claim that the contra-rotating propeller was not fast enough to be a propfan, and that it was simply an advanced propeller. The propfan/advanced propeller would power an unspecified Antonov airliner and be connected to the D-236 engine, which would be rated at 7,500 shaft kilowatts (10,000 hp). The engine was scheduled to start flight tests by the end of the year.

=== Flight tests ===
However, the engine didn't fly until it was mounted on an Ilyushin Il-76 testbed in 1987. By June 1989, it had accumulated 50 hours of flight tests on the Il-76, now traveling at speeds up to Mach 0.75 with good efficiency. The D-236 used the gas generator of the 8,500 kW (11,400 shp) Lotarev D-136 turboshaft engine, but added a planetary gearbox to drive the propellers. The Lotarev D-136 debuted earlier in the decade on the Mil Mi-26, the world's most powerful helicopter in production. The D-136 itself had a core that was based on the Lotarev D-36, a 6,500 kilograms-force (14,000 pounds-force; 64 kilonewtons) static thrust turbofan that entered service in the previous decade and powered the Antonov An-72, An-74, and Yakovlev Yak-42 Soviet airliners. A model of the propfan testbed aircraft was displayed at the Paris Air Show that month. The Ilyushin Il-76 with the D-236 engine was also flown to the Hannover ILA 90 airshow, with the engine now having eight blades on the front propeller and six blades on the back propeller. The Soviets claimed the D-236 had a true aerodynamic efficiency of 28 percent and a fuel savings of 30 percent over an equivalent turboprop. In addition, the Soviets revealed that the D-236 was intended for an unidentified four-propfan aircraft. (This aircraft was probably the An-70, which in 1990 was altered to use four Progress D-27 engines instead of the previous quad-engine D-236 configuration.) In total, the D-236 flew 36 times for a total of 70 flight test hours on the Il-76.

The D-236 engine also was tested in flight on a Yakovlev Yak-42E-LL starting on March 15, 1991. The engine now had a diameter of 4.2 m (14 ft; 420 cm; 170 in), a takeoff thrust of 10.5–11 tonnes-force (103–108 kilonewtons; 23,000–24,000 pounds-force), and an output power of 8,900 kW (12,000 hp), although it was limited to 7,050 kW (9,450 hp) on this testbed. The Yak-42E-LL testbed aircraft was flown to the 1991 Paris Air Show as a demonstration for the planned Yak-46 aircraft with twin propfan engines. The D-236 test engine replaced the right-sided D-36 aft engine that normally was used on the Yak-42 aircraft. The Yak-46 would have a base capacity of 150 seats, a range of 1,900 nautical miles (3,500 km; 2,200 mi), and a cruise speed of Mach 0.75 (460 kn; 850 km/h; 530 mph; 240 m/s; 780 ft/s). The D-236 finished testing on the Yak-42E-LL testbed before the end of 1991.

=== Other proposals ===
In addition, the Soviet Union considered using D-236 propfan engines on these publicly proposed aircraft:

- The Tupolev Tu-334, a 126-seat aircraft that can travel 1,860 nmi (3,450 km; 2,140 mi) with 11,430 kg payload (25,200 lb; 11.43 t; 12.60-short-ton), which would be powered by two Progress D-236 propfans with a specific fuel burn of 0.46 lb/lbf/h (13 g/kN/s), a cruise thrust of 1.6 tonnes-force (16 kN; 3,500 lbf), and a static thrust of 8 to 9 tf (78 to 88 kN; 18,000 to 20,000 lbf)
- The Ilyushin Il-88, a successor to the four-turboprop Antonov An-12 Cub tactical transporter that would be powered by two 8,200 kW (11,000 hp) Progress D-236 propfans
- The Ilyushin Il-118, an upgrade to the four-turboprop Ilyushin Il-18 airliner; proposed in 1984, the aircraft would instead be powered by two D-236 propfans, with the eight-bladed front propeller on each engine rotating at a speed of 1,100 rpm and the six-bladed back propeller turning at 1,000 rpm to lower noise and vibration

Although in November 1991, the Hamilton Standard propeller manufacturing division (and inventor of the propfan concept in the 1970s) of United Technologies was to meet with a Soviet aerospace delegation to discuss involvement in the D-236 project, the engine never made it into service. Only the Tu-334 was built, but it was produced with D-436 turbofan engines instead of propfans. The breakup of the Soviet Union plunged the successor states into financial troubles, which prevented further development of the D-236 and aircraft that would use that powerplant. One post-Soviet aircraft would eventually enter service with propfans, but the Antonov An-70 aircraft would instead use the Progress D-27, which was a larger, more powerful, and more advanced propfan engine.

== Applications ==
- Antonov An-32 (testbed)
- Antonov An-70
- British Aerospace 146 (BAe-146) (proposed twin-engine variant)
- Ilyushin Il-118
- Ilyushin Il-76 (testbed)
- Ilyushin Il-88
- Tupolev Tu-334
- Yakovlev Yak-42 (testbed)
- Yakovlev Yak-46

== Specifications ==
==== General characteristics ====
- Type: Three-shaft geared tractor-configuration propfan
- Length: N/A
- Width:
- Height:
- Propeller diameter: 4.2 m (14 ft; 420 cm; 170 in)
- Diameter:
- Dry weight: Engine and gearbox: 1,600 kg (3,500 lb); Propeller: 900 kg (2,000 lb); Total: 2,500 kg (5,500 lb)

==== Components ====
- Compressor:

==== Performance ====
- Maximum thrust: 10.5–11 tf (103–108 kN; 23,000–24,000 lbf)
- Specific fuel consumption: Takeoff: 0.2096 kg/(hp⋅h) (0.2811 kg/kWh; 0.462 lb/(hp⋅h)); Cruise: 0.1628 kg/(hp⋅h) (0.2183 kg/kWh; 0.359 lb/(hp⋅h))

== See also ==
- Europrop TP400
- Kuznetsov NK-12
- Kuznetsov NK-93

Related development

- Lotarev D-36
- Lotarev D-136
- Progress D-436
- Progress D-27

Comparable engines

- General Electric GE36
- Pratt & Whitney/Allison 578-DX
- Rolls-Royce RB3011

Related lists

- List of aircraft engines

== Bibliography ==
- "An-32". Airwar (in Russian). Archived from the original on October 21, 2018.
- Drozdov, Sergey Valerievich (2014). "Ан-70: строить нельзя закрыть программу" [An-70: You can't close the program] (PDF). Kryl'ia Rodiny (in Russian). No. 9–10. pp. 54–72. ISSN 0130-2701. Archived (PDF) from the original on July 4, 2019.
- Yakubovich, Nikolay Vasilevich (2009). "Chapter 12. Plane for high altitude". Unknown Antonov (in Russian). Eksmo. ISBN 978-5-699-32738-6. OCLC 436878639.
- "Engine facility developing new propfan engines". Soviet Aerospace Industry. Aviation Week & Space Technology. Vol. 130, no. 24. Zaporozhye, USSR. June 12, 1989. p. 311. ISSN 0005-2175.
- Fink, Donald (June 5, 1989). "Progress Engine Design Bureau responsible for wide product line". Soviet Aerospace Industry. Aviation Week & Space Technology. Vol. 130, no. 23. Zaporozhye, USSR. p. 48. ISSN 0005-2175.
- "Cost efficient, reliable, maintainable — these are today's primary aircraft requirements" (DjVu). ICAO Journal: Official Magazine of International Civil Aviation. Vol. 43, no. 7. July 1988. pp. 51–54. ISSN 1014-8876. OCLC 22283622.
  - "ICAO Journal". International Civil Aviation Organization.
