= Lotarev D-136 =

Turboshaft helicopter engine

D-136
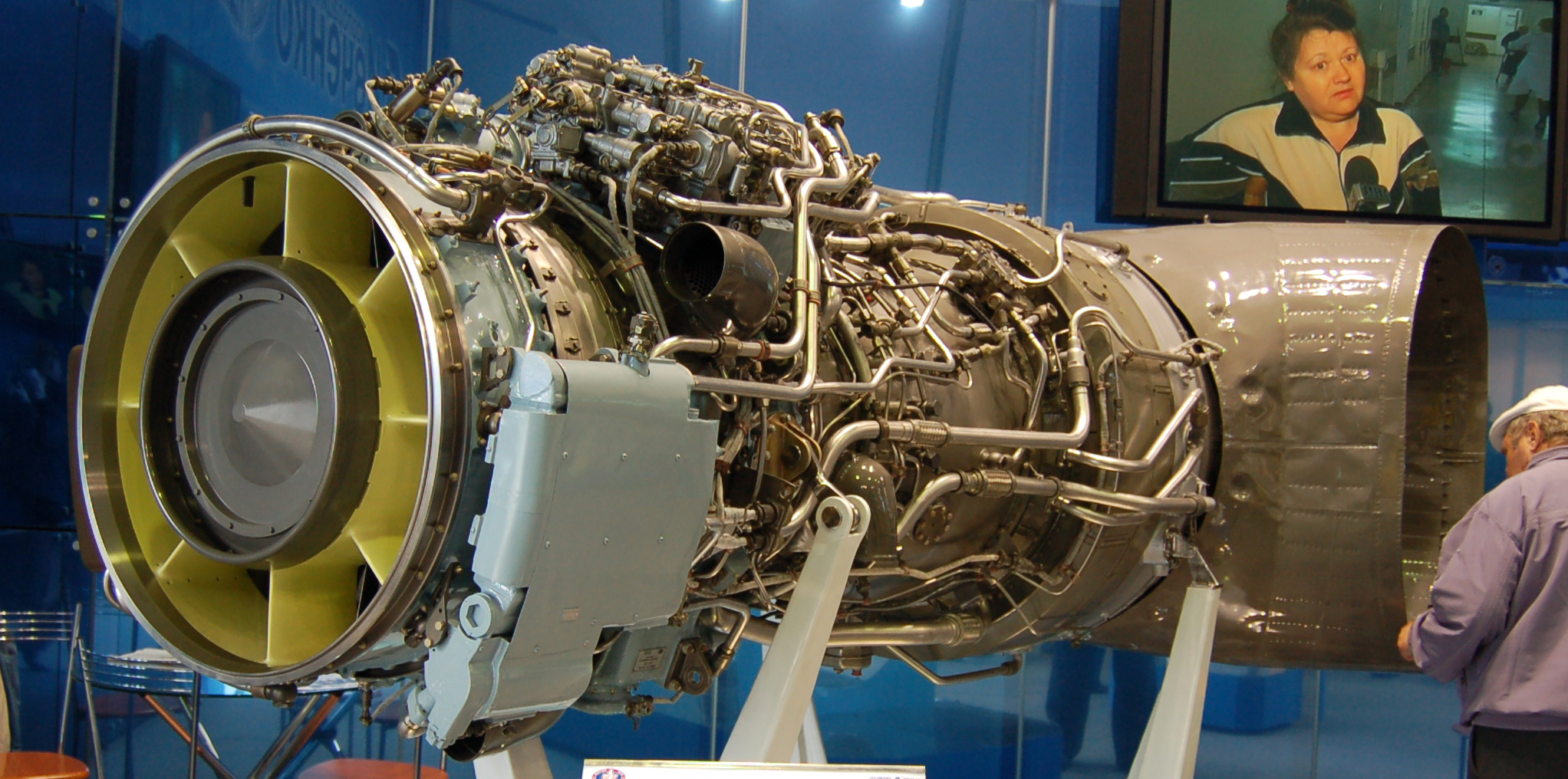
- The Ivchenko-Progress D-136 engine on display at the 2009 MAKS Air Show.
- Type: Turboshaft
- National origin: Soviet Union
- Manufacturer: Ivchenko-Progress / Motor Sich
- Major applications: Mil Mi-26
- Developed from: Lotarev D-36
- Developed into: Progress D-236

The Lotarev D-136 is a turboshaft engine from the ZMKB Progress Design Bureau. The engine powers the Mil Mi-26 "Halo" helicopter. Development of the engine had begun in about 1972.. The D-136 first flew on a production Mi-26 helicopter in 1980.

== Design ==
The core of the engine is identical to the Lotarev D-36 turbofan from which the D-136 is derived.

== Applications ==
- Mil Mi-26

== Specifications ==
Data from Mil's heavylift helicopters, pages 90-91

==== General characteristics ====
- Type: 3-spool turboshaft
- Length: 3,964 mm (13 ft 0 in)
- Width: 1,670 mm (5 ft 6 in)
- Height: 1,160 mm (3 ft 10 in)
- Diameter:
- Dry weight: 1,050 kg (2,315 lb)

==== Components ====
- Compressor: 7-stage subsonic high-pressure (HP) compressor, 6-stage transonic low-pressure (LP) compressor
- Combustors: Annular combustion chamber, 24 fuel nozzles, 2 igniters
- Turbine: 1-stage HP turbine @ 14,170 rpm, 1-stage LP turbine @ 10,950 rpm, 2-stage free-power turbine @ 8,300 rpm (±300 rpm)

==== Performance ====
- Maximum power output: Takeoff: 10,000 equivalent shp (7,500 kW); Contingency: 11,400 equivalent shp (8,500 kW); Sustained: 8,500 equivalent shp (6,338 kW)
- Overall pressure ratio: 18.3
- Air mass flow: 36 kg/s (79 lb/s)
- Turbine inlet temperature: Takeoff: 1,478 K (2,660 °R; 1,205 °C; 2,201 °F); Maximum: 1,516 K (2,729 °R; 1,243 °C; 2,269 °F)
- Specific fuel consumption: Takeoff: 0.198 kg/(hp⋅h) (0.265 kg/kWh; 0.436 lb/(hp⋅h)); Cruise: 0.206 kg/(hp⋅h) (0.276 kg/kWh; 0.454 lb/(hp⋅h))
- Power-to-weight ratio: 4.93 shp/lb (8.1 kW/kg)

== See also ==
Related development

- Lotarev D-36
- Progress D-236

Comparable engines

- Allison T701
- Aviadvigatel PD-12V

Related lists

- List of aircraft engines

== Bibliography ==
- "Ukraine starts testing improved engine for heavy helicopters". Russian Aviation Insider. 26 January 2017.
- "Soviets develop turboshaft powerplant for transports". Paris Air Show. Aviation Week & Space Technology. 15 June 1981. pp. 28–29. ISSN 0005-2175.
