= Lotarev D-36 =

Soviet and Ukrainian turbofan aircraft engine

D-36
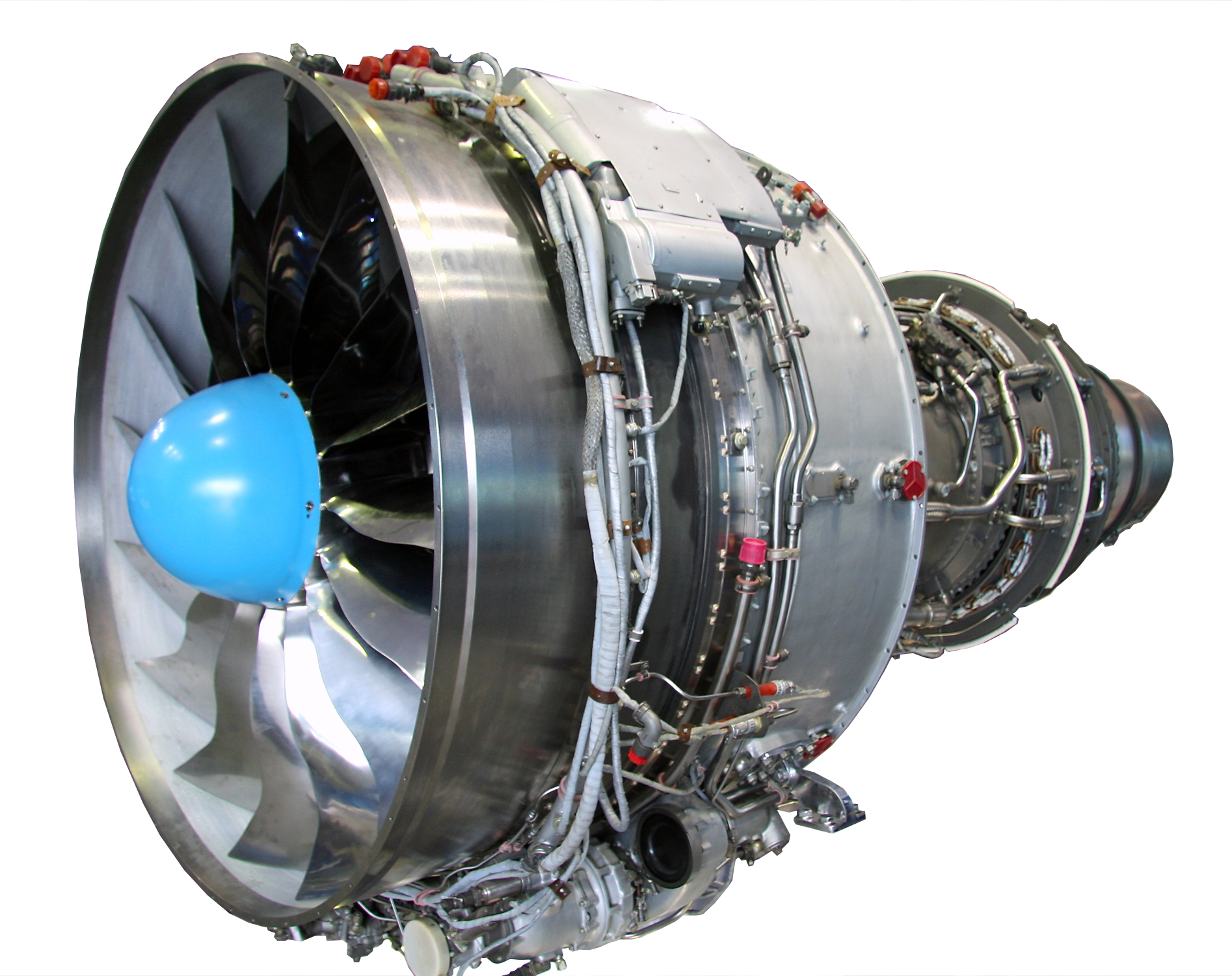
- D-36MV
- Type: Turbofan
- National origin: USSR
- Manufacturer: Ivchenko-Progress; Motor Sich
- First run: 1971
- Major applications: Antonov An-72; Antonov An-74; Yakovlev Yak-42
- Developed into: Lotarev D-136; Progress D-436

The Ivchenko Progress D-36 (also known as Lotarev D-36) is a three-shaft high bypass ratio turbofan currently produced by the Ukrainian Motor Sich company.

== Design and development ==
The engine was developed for the Yak-42, An-72 and An-74 aircraft and was very advanced when it was first introduced in the 1970s. The engine was designed by Vladimir Lotarev. The first test runs began in 1971, first flight tests followed in 1974, serial production began in 1977.

The engine has a single-stage fan with 29 titanium blades and a Kevlar outer shell, which is driven by a three-stage turbine. The six-stage low-pressure compressor with titanium blades is driven by a single-stage non-cooled low pressure turbine. The seven-stage high-pressure compressor with steel blades is driven by a steel-bladed high-pressure turbine.

Since the tradition in the Soviet era was to gradually and continuously improve engines in serviceability, engines went from Series 1 to 3A (depending on the application). The Series 1 (used on Yak-42D) did not feature any reverse thrust system; however, series 1A to 3A were fitted with bucket-type thrust reversers (used on An-72/An-74). The most recent upgrade (after the Soviet breakup) is Series 4A which has been in manufacture since 2002. Improvements included updated curved titanium blades and a built-in reverse thrust device. More advanced blade design along with proprietary wear-resistant and heat-protective coatings have resulted in improved specific fuel consumption (kg/h/kgf) dropping from 0.65 to 0.63. Specified service life has also improved exponentially to 40,000 hours. The current application for Series 4A is on An-74TK-300.

== Specifications ==
Type	Thrust (kN)	Bypass ratio at start	Pressure ratio	Fan diameter (mm)	Length (mm)	Weight (kg)	Introduction	Application
Series 1	63.75	5.6:1	20:1	1,333	3,930	1,124	1971	Yakovlev Yak-42
Series 1A/2A	63.75	5.6:1	20:1	1,333	3,192	1,124	?	Antonov An-72; Antonov An-74
Series 3A	63.75	5.6:1	20:1	1,333	3,192	1,124	?	Antonov An-74
Series 4A	63.75	5.6:1	20:1	1,333	3,732	1,130	2002	An-74TK-300

Data from Élodie Roux, page 158

==== General characteristics ====
- Type: 3-shaft turbofan
- Length: 3.47 m (136.6 in)
- Diameter: 1.333 m (52.5 in)
- Dry weight: 1,109 kg (2,445 lb)

==== Components ====
- Compressor: 7-stage high-pressure compressor, 6-stage low-pressure compressor
- Turbine: 1-stage high-pressure turbine, 1-stage low-pressure turbine, 3-stage free-power turbine

==== Performance ====
- Maximum thrust: Static sea level: 6,500.0 kgf (63.743 kN; 14,330 lbf); Cruise: 1,599.8 kgf (15.689 kN; 3,527 lbf) at Mach 0.75 speed, 8,001 m (26,250 ft) altitude
- Overall pressure ratio: 18.7
- Bypass ratio: 6.3
- Air mass flow: 254.9 kg/s (562 lb/s)
- Specific fuel consumption: Static sea level: 10.2 g/(kN⋅s) (0.36 lb/(lbf⋅h)); Cruise: 18.4 g/(kN⋅s) (0.65 lb/(lbf⋅h))

== See also ==
Related development

- Lotarev D-136
- Progress D-236
- Progress D-436

Related lists

- List of aircraft engines
