= Vyacheslav Bohuslayev =

Ukrainian businessman and politician

Hero of Ukraine Vyacheslav Boguslayev OS
- В’ячеслав Богуслаєв
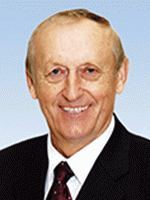
- Official portrait, 2014

People's Deputy of Ukraine
- In office 25 May 2006 – 29 August 2019
- Succeeded by: Serhiy Shtepa
- Constituency: Party of Regions, No. 5 (2006–2007); Party of Regions, No. 11 (2007–2012); Zaporizhzhia Oblast, No. 77 (2012–2019)

Personal details
- Born: 28 October 1938 (age 87) Uralsk, Kazakh SSR, Soviet Union (now Oral, Kazakhstan)
- Party: Independent (since 2014)
- Other political affiliations: Party of Regions (until 2014)
- Awards: Hero of Ukraine
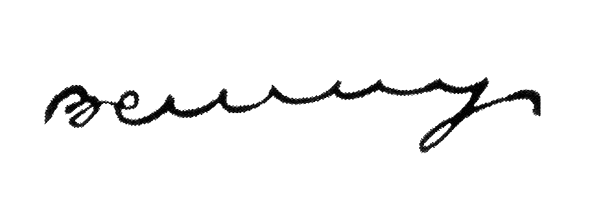
- Signature

Vyacheslav Oleksandrovych Boguslayev (Note: Also transliterated as Bohuslayev) (Ukrainian: В’ячесла́в Олекса́ндрович Богусла́єв; born 28 October 1938) is a Ukrainian engineer, businessman, and politician. A former member of the Party of Regions, Boguslayev served as a People's Deputy of Ukraine from 2006 to 2019. He is primarily known as the chief engineer of Motor Sich, a company producing airplane engines.

He was arrested on 22 October 2022 for treason by the Security Service of Ukraine. Many of Boguslayev's assets, particularly ones that were strategic to the Ukrainian state in light of the 2022 Russian invasion of Ukraine, including his ownership of Motor Sich, were nationalized by the Ukrainian government in November 2022.

== Business career ==
From 1956 to 1960, Boguslayev served in Soviet Army and worked as an assistant engine driver at the Uralsk shipbuilding yard. In 1961, he moved to Zaporizhzhia, where he worked as a mechanic. In the same year, he entered Zaporizhzhia Technical Institute and graduated in 1965, specializing in air engines with a qualification of mechanic engineer.

- 1966 - Vyacheslav Boguslayev started working at Zaporizhzhia Engine Plant as a construction engineer.
- 1969-1973 - Head of the department.
- 1973-1988 - Director of Volochysk Engineering Plant (Khmelnytskyi Oblast).
- 1988-1994 - Director General of "Motorobudіvnik", Zaporizhzhia.
- 1994-2006 - Chairman of the Board, General Director of JSC "Motor Sich" (ex-"Motorobudіvnik").
- Since 2006 - Chairman of the Board of Directors, Honorary President of JSC "Motor Sich."

In October 2022, Boguslayev was detained by the Security Service of Ukraine. The Motor Sich's head is accused of illegal supplies of helicopter engines to Russian military enterprises. The period when this happened is not specified. The Russian state corporation Rostec has announced that it has not been using Ukrainian engines since 2014.

== Social activities ==
- 2001-2004 - Member of the Guardian Council of the National Fund of Social Protection of Mothers and Children "Ukraine to Children."
- Since 2001 Vyacheslav Boguslayev has been the president of the International Charity Fund "Dnipro-Sich."
- Member of the National Council on Philanthropy, established in 2007 at the initiative of President Viktor Yushchenko and led by his daughter Vitalina.

== Politics ==
- In 2006-2007 Vyacheslav Boguslayev was elected as People's Deputy of Ukraine to the 5th Verkhovna Rada from the Party of Regions (No 5 on the list). At that time, he was the Head of the Subcommittee on Legislative National Defense, the defense industry complex supplies, military and military-technical cooperation of the Verkhovna Rada Committee on National Security and Defence. He was as well a member of the Party of Regions.
- In November 2007, Vyacheslav Boguslayev became the MP of the 6th Verkhovna Rada, elected from the Party of Regions (No. 11 on the list). He was Deputy Head of the Verkhovna Rada Committee on National Security and Defence Policy.
- Deputy Chairman of the Verkhovna Rada of Ukraine Committee on National Security and Defense.
- Member of the Interparliamentary Commission on Cooperation between The Verkhovna Rada of Ukraine and the Federal Assembly of Russia.
- Member of the Group for Interparliamentary Relations with the Republic of India.
- Member of the Group for Interparliamentary Relations with the United Arab Emirates.
- Member of the Group for Interparliamentary Relations with the Russian Federation.
- Member of the Group for Interparliamentary Relations with the Federal Republic of Germany.
- Member of the Group for Interparliamentary Relations with the Republic of Kazakhstan.
- Member of the Group for Interparliamentary Relations with the People's Republic of China.
- Member of the Group for Interparliamentary Relations with the Democratic Socialist Republic of Sri Lanka.

In the 2012 Ukrainian parliamentary election, he was re-elected into the Verkhovna Rada after winning the Ukraine's 77th electoral district, located in Zaporizhzhia Oblast, for the Party of Regions.

In the 2014 Ukrainian parliamentary election, Boguslayev was again re-elected after again winning a constituency seat in Zaporizhzhia; this time as an independent candidate. In the 2019 Ukrainian parliamentary election, he lost his seat in this constituency to Servant of the People member Serhiy Shtepa.

== Personal life and family ==
Vyacheslav Boguslayev is married with one son. His wife, Elena Boguslayeva (born 1946), is now retired, and worked as a teacher. His son Oleksandr Vyacheslavovich (born 2 August 1978) was a chief engineer at JSC "Motor Sich," Deputy of Zaporizhzhia City Council.

From 2009 to 2018, Bohuslayev and his son Oleksandr purchased at least 19 properties in Dubai for $15 million. In 2019, the family began selling off these assets. By 2024, they only owned five Dubai properties.

== Awards and titles ==
- 1970 - Medal "Veteran of Labour".
- 1982 - Order of the Red Banner of Labour.
- 1996, 1998, 1999 - Order of Merit, three times, 1st, 2nd and 3rd classes.
- September 1996 - Presidential Honourable distinction.
- 19 January 2000 - Hero of Ukraine, conferred by decree of President Leonid Kuchma "for outstanding contribution to the development of Ukrainian engineering".
- 2001 - State Prize in Science and Technology.
- 2004 - Order of Friendship (Russia) for his significant contribution to strengthening Russian-Ukrainian cooperation.
- In 2010 he headed a list of "Ten Ukrainians who have made the most outstanding contribution to the strengthening of national security and development of national arms of Ukraine in 2005-2010."
- Jubilee Medal "In Commemoration of the 100th Anniversary of the Birth of Vladimir Ilyich Lenin".
- Order of the Badge of Honour (USSR).
- Award of the Council of Ministers of the USSR.

Boguslayev is a Doctor of Engineering, professor, member of the Academy of Engineering Sciences of Ukraine, Academy of transport, Academy of Aviation and Aeronautics, Honorary Doctor of National Aerospace University named after M. Zhukovsky - Kharkiv Aviation Institute, Honorary Professor of Zaporizhzhia National Technical University. Board member of the Ukrainian Culture Fund, Honorary Academician of the Academy of Higher Education of Ukraine.
