= Ivchenko-Progress =

Aircraft engine manufacturer

Ivchenko-Progress ZMKB ЗМКБ «Прогрес» ім. О.Г.Івченка
- Company type: State enterprise
- Industry: Aerospace
- Founded: 1945; 81 years ago
- Headquarters: Zaporizhzhia, Ukraine
- Products: drafts and plans on Aircraft engines and Gas turbines
- Parent: Ukrainian Defense Industry

Ivchenko-Progress ZMKB (Ukrainian: Запорізьке машинобудівне конструкторське бюро «Прогрес» ім. О.Г.Івченка, Zaporizhzhia Machine-Building Design Bureau "Progress" State Enterprise named after Academician O.H.Ivchenko), formerly OKB-478 and Ivchenko-Lotarev, is a state design bureau that creates drafts and plans for aircraft engines in Zaporizhzhia, Ukraine whose products are widely used in both civil and military aircraft, most notably by Antonov, Beriev, Ilyushin, Tupolev, Mil and Yakovlev. The design bureau works closely with Motor Sich, the turbine manufacturer located in Zaporizhzhia which produces those engines.

Polish manufacturer PZL-Mielec used the Progress ZMKB AI-25TL engine in the PZL M-15 Belphegor cropduster. Both the largest plane in the world, the Antonov An-225 Mriya and the largest helicopter, the Mil Mi-26, are powered by Progress/Lotarev engines.

The bureau is administered by the Ukrainian Defense Industry and the Ministry of Industrial Policy.

== History ==
The company has been involved for 60 years in the design of engines to power aircraft and helicopters of various types, and also designs drives and special equipment for industrial applications.

Three notable designers have led the development during this time:

- 1945–1968: Oleksandr Heorhiiovych Ivchenko (Ukrainian: Олександр Георгійович Івченко) (Oleksandr Georgijovych Ivchenko)
- 1968–1989: Volodymyr Oleksiyovych Lotaryev (Ukrainian: Володимир Олексійович Лотарєв) (Volodmyr Oleksijovych Lotarev)
- 1989-2010: Fedir Mykhailovych Muravchenko (Ukrainian: Федір Михайлович Муравченко)
- 2010-: Ihor Fedorovych Kravchenko (Ukrainian: Ігор Федорович Кравченко)

Initially General Oleksandr Ivchenko designed piston engines. These engines were denoted AI. Work on their first turbine engine, the TS-12, began in 1953. Since the beginning of the 1960s the company have been developing bypass gas turbine engines. Under the direction of Volodymyr Lotarev, the organization developed the first operational Soviet high-bypass turbofans, the Lotarev D-36 in 1971.

This organization is now known as Ivchenko-Progress ZMKB and is based in Ukraine. Their engines are being operated successfully by numerous airlines around the world, including Volga-Dnepr, Antonov Airlines, and Polet Flight.

In January 2015, Diamond Aircraft of Austria announced the first flight of the Diamond DA50-JP7 powered by a 465 hp AI-450S turboprop engine developed by Ukraine's Motor Sich JSC and Ivchenko-Progress. However, Diamond ended up getting EASA certification on its DA50 RG model with a Continental CD-300 engine in September 2020, and FAA certification in July 2023.

Turkish strategic drone Akinci is powered by these engines and flies up to 40,000 feet.

== Production ==
True to the Soviet tradition, design is kept separate from production. Many of the bureau's designs were or are produced at Motor Sich, located at Zaporizhzhia International Airport.

== Products ==
=== Turbofans ===
- Ivchenko AI-25
- Lotarev DV-2
- Progress AI-22
- Progress AI-222
- Ivchenko-Progress AI-322
- MS-400

=== High-bypass turbofans ===
- Lotarev / Progress D-18T
- Lotarev D-36
- Progress D-436

=== Propfans ===
- Progress D-27
- Progress D-236

=== Turboprops ===
- Ivchenko AI-20
- Ivchenko AI-24
- Ivchenko-Progress AI-450S / S2
- MS-14
- MS-500

=== Turboshafts ===
- Lotarev D-136 / Ivchenko AI-136
- MS-500V

=== Turbojets ===
- Ivchenko AI-7
- PBS AI-PBS-350

=== Reciprocating engines ===
- Ivchenko AI-4 flat-four, powered the Kamov Ka-10
- Ivchenko AI-10 prototype single-row, 5 cylinder radial; intended for the Yakovlev Yak-20
- Ivchenko AI-14 single-row, nine-cylinder radial; powered the Yakovlev Yak-12, Yakovlev Yak-18, Antonov An-14, Kamov Ka-15 and Kamov Ka-18
- Ivchenko AI-26 single-row, seven cylinder radial; powered the Mil Mi-1

== See also ==
- Motor Sich
- Zorya-Mashproekt, another engine design bureau in Mykolaiv
