= Motor Sich MS-500V =

MS-500V
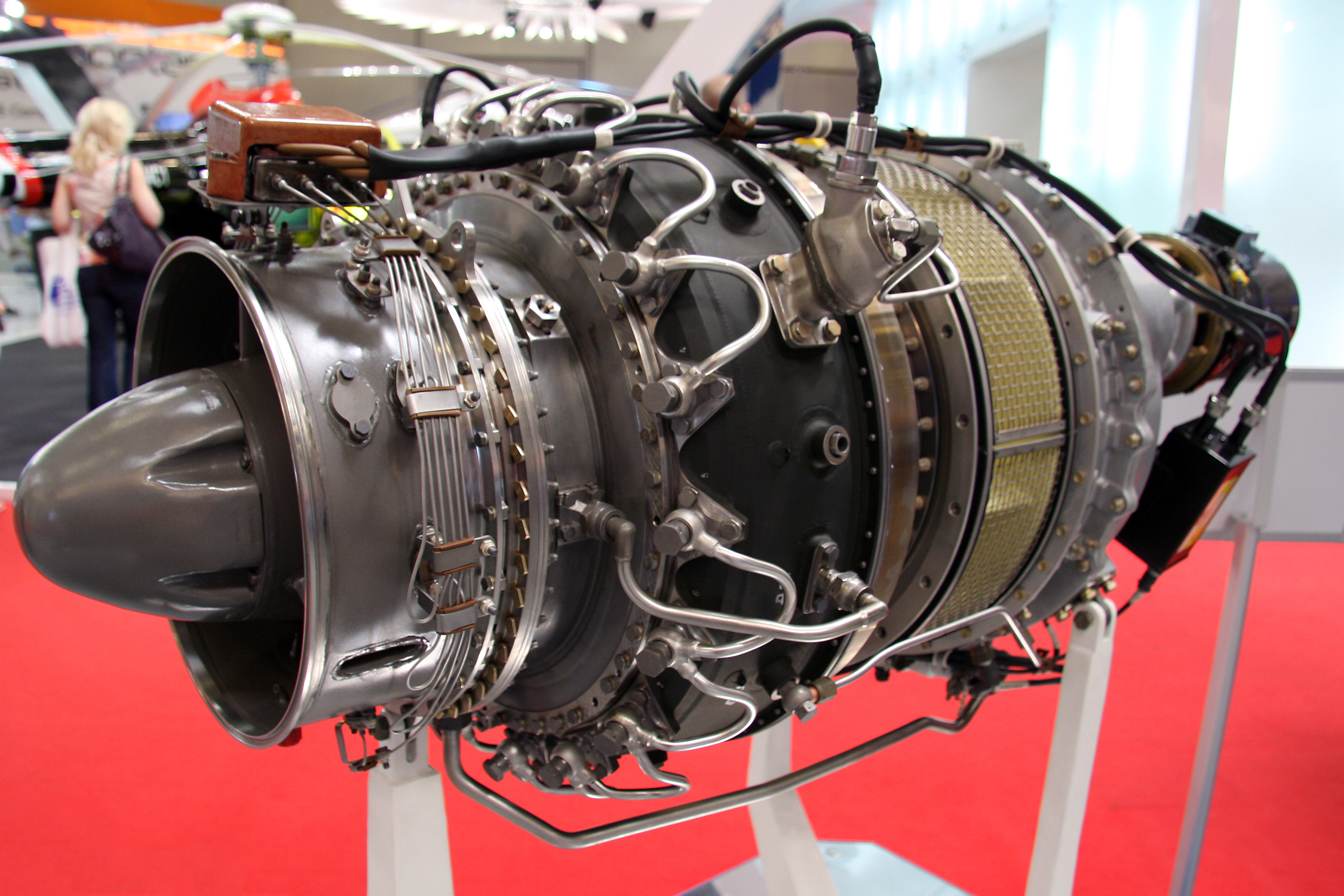
- Type: Turboshaft
- National origin: Ukraine
- Manufacturer: Motor Sich
- First run: 2008
- Major applications: Kazan Ansat

The MS-500V is a Ukrainian family of military and civilian turboshaft engines developed by Motor Sich. The new engine is intended for helicopters with a takeoff weight up to 6 tonnes. Its certification is scheduled for the first quarter of 2011, and it will power the new Kazan Ansat-U training helicopter, currently equipped with the Pratt & Whitney Canada PW207K engine.

== Applications ==
- Kazan Ansat
- PZL W-3

== Specifications (MS-500V) ==
Data from

==== General characteristics ====
- Type: Turboshaft
- Length:
- Diameter:
- Dry weight:

==== Components ====
- Compressor:

==== Performance ====
- Maximum power output: 850hp
- Specific fuel consumption: 0.294kg/hp.h(0.400kg/kW.h)

== See also ==
Related lists

- List of aircraft engines
