= Motor Sich =

Ukrainian aircraft engine manufacturer

Joint Stock Company Motor Sich

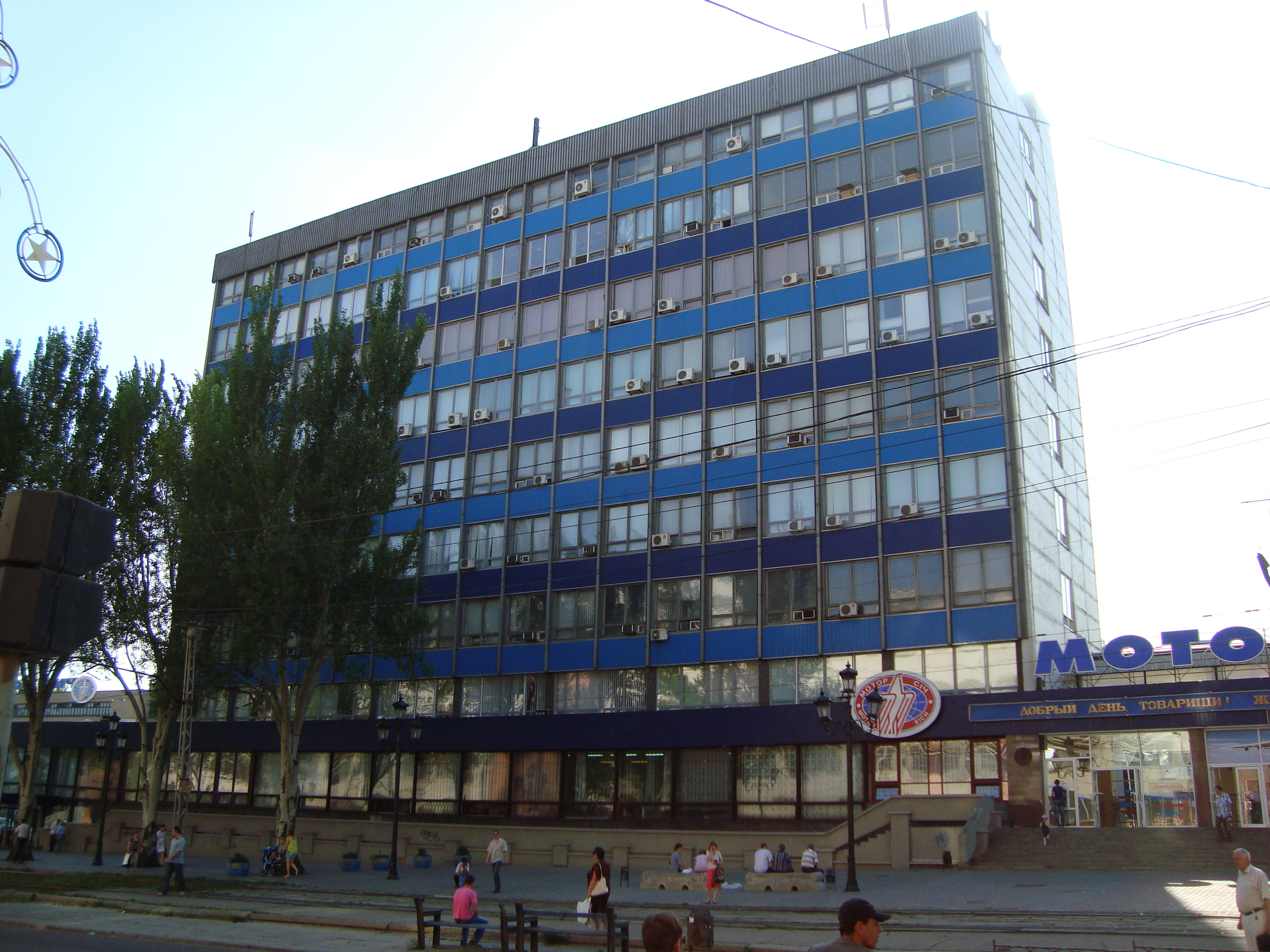
- Central entrance to the Motor Sich plant
- Industry: Aerospace industry Defence
- Founded: 1907; 119 years ago in Alexandrovsk, Yekaterinoslav Governorate, Russian Empire
- Founder: Hatskel Moznaim; Rafael Moznaim
- Headquarters: Zaporizhzhia, Ukraine
- Area served: Worldwide
- Products: Aircraft engines, Turbojet engines
- Net income: ▲ ₴3.3 billion (2015)
- Total assets: ▲ ₴20.7 billion (2015)
- Number of employees: 21,860 (December, 2010)
- Website: https://motorsich.com/eng/

The Motor Sich, Joint Stock Company (Ukrainian: АТ «Мотор Січ») is a Ukrainian aircraft engine manufacturer headquartered in Zaporizhzhia. The company manufactures engines for airplanes and helicopters as well as industrial marine gas turbines and installations.

== Overview ==
Motor Sich currently produces the Ivchenko Progress D-18 turbofan which powers variants of the Antonov An-124 and An-225 freighters, although the Ivchenko Progress D-36/Ivchenko Progress D-436 series remain the highest production-rate engines in the CIS.

Motor Sich inherited some of the former Soviet Union's aero engine manufacturing capabilities. It produces turbofan, turboprop and rotary-wing turboshaft engines that power aircraft in Russian service, such as Mi- and Ka-series military helicopters.

In 2017 Beijing's Skyrizon Aviation purchased a 41% holding in Motor Sich. Skyrizon Aviation had agreed to first invest $250 million in the Ukrainian Zaporizhzhia plants and help Motor Sich to set up a new assembly and servicing plant in Chongqing.

The company announced that it planned to launch its own helicopter, dubbed Hope, in 2018.

Some individuals, including former counsel to the US Senate Foreign Relation Committee, William C. Triplet, have criticized Ukraine for allowing Motor Sich to conduct business with Chinese firms. Oleh Lyashko, leader of Ukraine’s Radical Party, said if the US does not want Motor Sich to be closer with the Chinese, then they need to buy enough aircraft engines.

Motor Sich severed ties with Russia in 2014, its biggest client, and consequently made efforts to find new markets. The US administration of Donald Trump, added Skyrizon to a Military End-User (MEU) List. President Volodymyr Zelenskyy then signed a decree imposing sanctions on Skyrizon to restrict its trading operations, while the company responded with a $3.5 billion arbitration case.

On 11 March 2021, the Ukrainian government announced its intention to nationalize Motor Sich by buying back shares from Chinese holders. Secretary of the National Security and Defense Council of Ukraine Oleksiy Danilov said the government's decision is to "return Motor Sich to the Ukrainian people" and that "investors will be compensated".

Several Turkish military products use Motor Sich engines, including the Bayraktar TB2, Bayraktar Akinci, Bayraktar Kızılelma, TAI Anka-3 drones and the TAI T929 ATAK 2 helicopter. Director-General of Motor Sich, Vyacheslav Bohuslayev noted that a $100 million loan from China needs to be repaid in 2026.

Among the company's new products is the MS-500V turboshaft engine, originally intended for the Russian Ansat helicopter.

Following the Russian invasion of Ukraine, the Motor Sich plant in Zaporizhzhia was struck multiple times by Russian attacks. Russia said that the plant was destroyed in late May 2022. It was again struck in August 2022, August 2023, and January 2025.

== History ==
=== Foundation ===
In August 1907, politician, industrialist and Jewish community leader Hatskel Moznaim filed a petition with the Alexandrovsk City Duma for the establishment of an iron foundry and machine building plant. In 1908, the project was approved by the authorities of the Yekaterinoslav Governorate on the site of the former Taras Shevchenko fairgrounds, and construction began shortly after. By 1909, construction work was complete. In 1912, the H. and R. Moznaim Machine-Building Plant had 56 employees, and produced a variety of agricultural machinery. By 1914, the complex was valued at 367,786 rubles.

=== DEKA ===
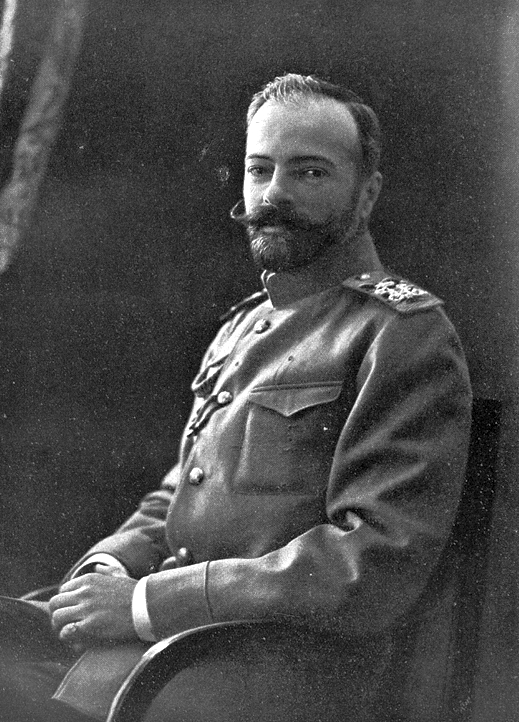
Grand Duke Alexander Mikhailovich of Russia

In December 1915, the plant was acquired by the Petrograd based Duflon, Konstantinovich and K (DEKA) amid increasing demand for aircraft engines as a result of the World War I. Facilities operated by DEKA were already located next to the plant, making its takeover advantageous. Although DEKA already had a presence through the Empire, with facilities in Petrograd, Moscow, Kharkov and Yekaterinburg, they were already fully devoted to military production. The deal was negotiated through the support of Grand Duke Alexander Mikhailovich of Russia, chief of the Imperial Russian Air Service. Anticipating the end of the war, plans were additionally made for the production of electric motors and dynamos.

In September 1915, the plant entered into a contract to supply the Imperial Russian Air Service with engines, with additional production and administrative buildings built. Despite the ongoing war, 500 thousand rubles worth of equipment was able to be imported from the United States through Vladivostok and Arkhangelsk. Following the plants expansion, the enterprise became the largest engine-building complex in Russia in terms of both building size and equipment. Construction was carried out by both specialised workers, as well as up to 70 prisoners of the Central Powers.

By August 1916, production of the DEKA M-100 aircraft engine had been established, intended for use with the Ilya Muromets heavy bomber designed by Igor Sikorsky. A young Vladimir Klimov was involved in the design of the engine. Engines for Lebed and Antara aircraft were also produced. However, admit mounting economic chaos and revolutionary unrest, the plant effectively halted production by 1917. In 1918, the complex was nominally nationalised by the new Bolshevik government, but remained non-functional as a result of the Russian Civil War, with the city of Alexandrovsk changing eighteen times throughout the course of the war.

=== Revolution ===
Tumansky M-88

in 1920 the plant was transferred to the jurisdiction of the Glavkoavia under the name of GAZ No. 9. (Note: Gosudarstvenny Aviatsionny Zavod (State Aviation Plant)) Two years later, the appendage "Bolshevik" was added. From 1917, it became known as the State Aircraft Plant No. 29. Following the death of Soviet aviator Pyotr Baranov in 1933, the plant was renamed in his honour. In 1923, preparations for the production of M-6 engines (a licensed derivative of the Hispano-Suiza 8Fb) began, in production from 1925 to 1932. In addition to aircraft, it powered the T-24 medium tank. Starting in 1929, Shvetsov M-11 five-cylinder radial engines were manufactured, followed in 1931 by the nine-cylinder Shvetsov M-22. In the 1930s, the licensed production and transfer of technical assistance of Gnome et Rhône aircraft engines began. Beginning in 1935, production of the fourteen-cylinder Tumansky M-85 began, followed by the upgraded M-86, M-87, M-88 and M-89. By early 1941, the expansion of the plant had been completed, located in three territories with a total area of 171,900 square meters.

=== World War II ===
==== Soviet evacuation ====
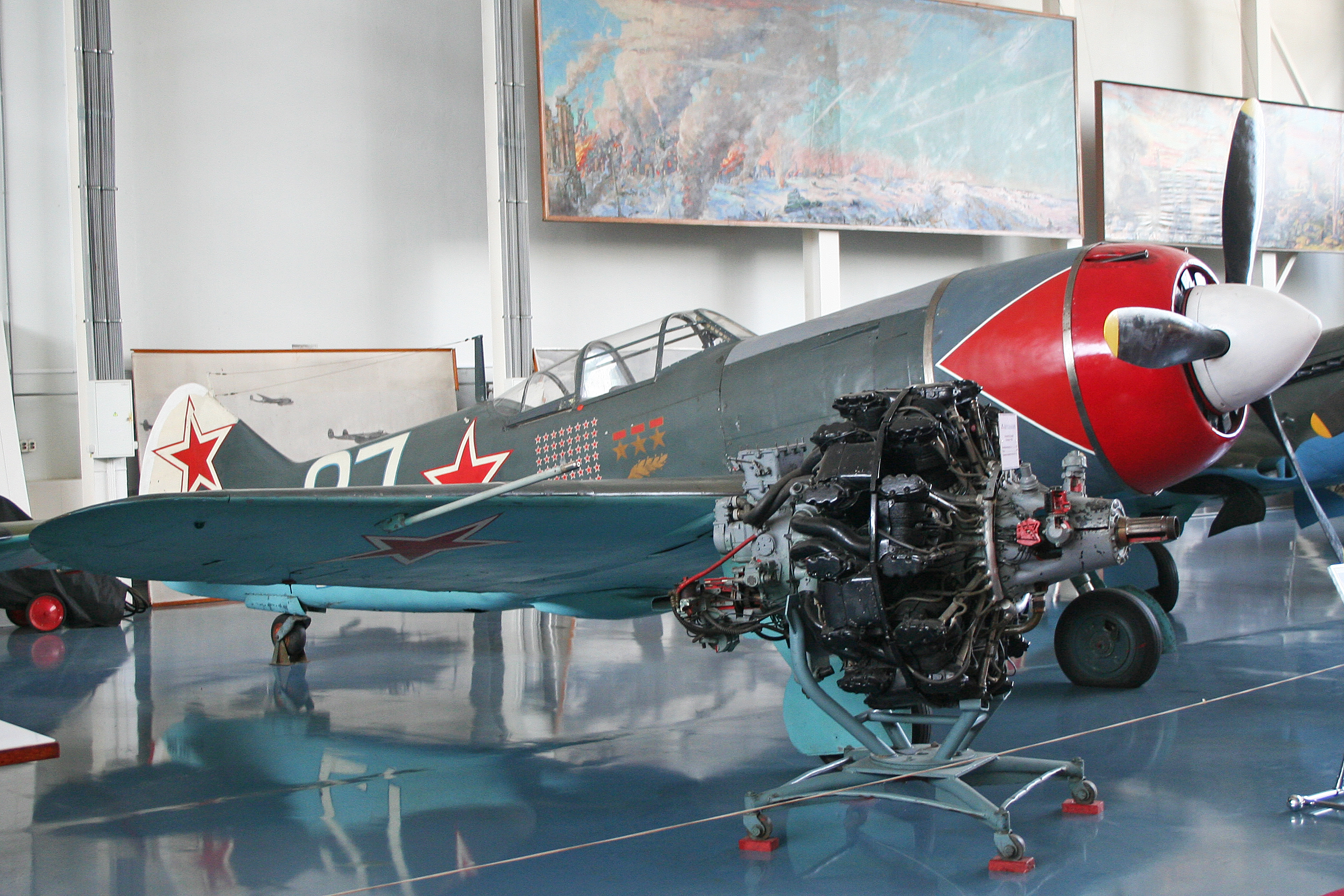
Lavochkin La-7 with Shvetsov ASh-82FN engine flown by Soviet ace Ivan Kozhedub

With the launch of Operation Barbarossa in June 1941 and the rapid Nazi German offensive into Ukraine, Plant No. 29 was evacuated to the east, with evacuation taking place until September 1941. Evacuation took place amid deteriorating conditions, with German forces crossing the right-bank of the Dnieper and reaching withing artillery and mortar range of the factory complexes. The dismantling of the plant was carried out over a period of four days, with over 3,000 wagons loaded with staff and industrial equipment. The order to evacuate the plant was given on 12 August 1941, with the last transports leaving on 28 September 1941. The evacuated plant was integrated with No. 29 plant based in Omsk, in Siberia beyond the Ural Mountains.

The relocation from Zaporizhzhia to Omsk was a significant undertaking, with equipment packed into 1,056 railcars carrying over 2,000 metal-cutting and press machines, tooling, and approximately 18,500 personnel and their families. By November 1941, the first batch of Tumansky M-88 engines began, scaling to high rate production by January 1942. In 1943, the production of 14-cylinder Shvetsov ASh-82 engines began in Omsk, which were installed on La-5 and La-7 fighters, Tu-2 and Pe-8 bombers, and later Il-12 passenger aircraft. By the end of the war, over 25,000 aircraft engines had been produced at the evacuated plant in Omsk.

==== German occupation ====
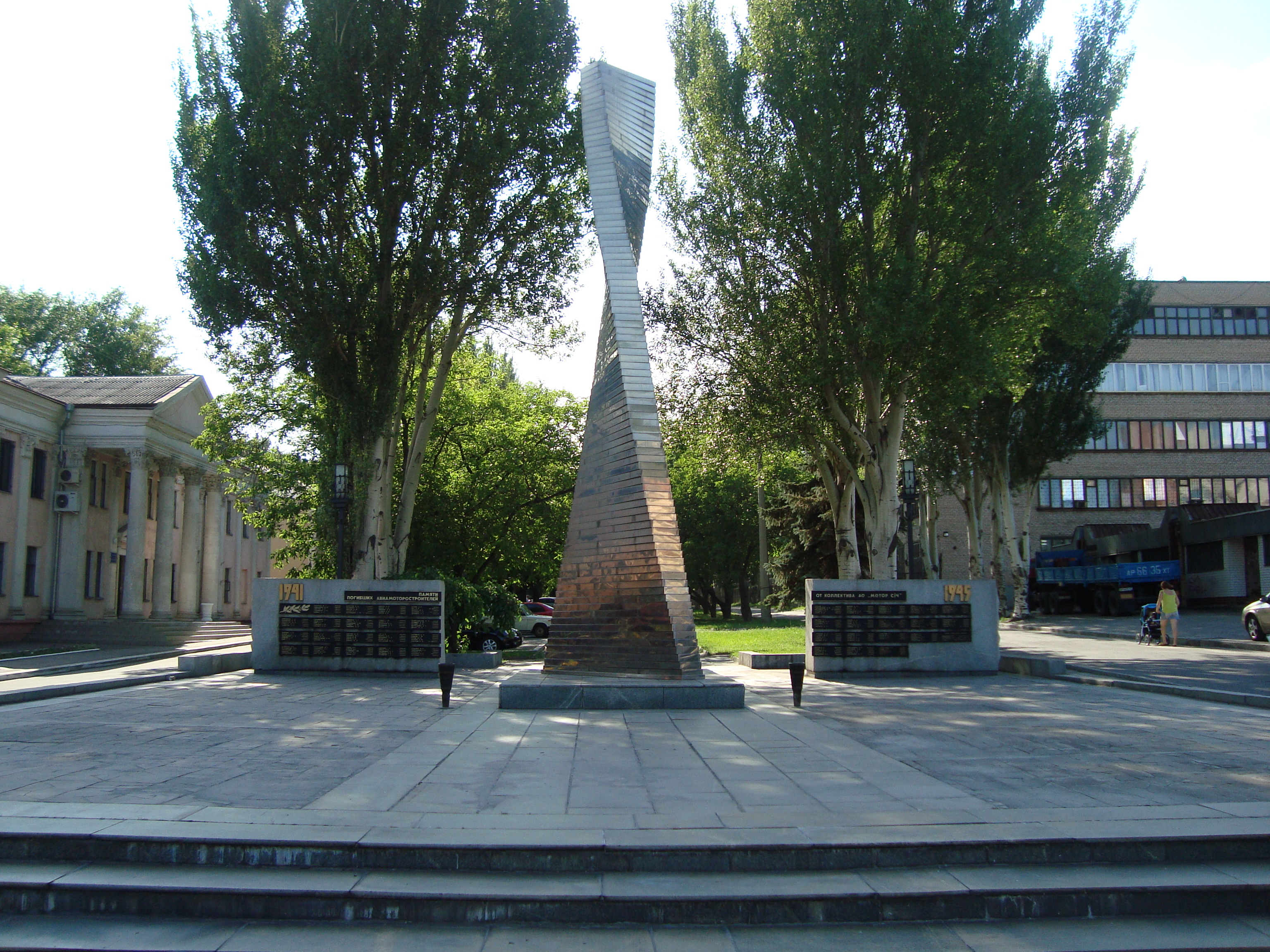
Monument to Hero Engine Builders, erected in 1995

During the German occupation of Zaporizhzhia, Plant No. 29 was pressed into limited use, with local civilians employed at the site. A prisoner-of-war camp was also reportedly operated at the site of the plant, with an account describing a woman bribing the camp commandant to release two captured Red Army soldiers. The Akatov group was a partisan organisation which operated on the former site of the plant. The group was reported to have carried out oral agitation, posted anti-German leaflets and destroyed machinery. Germany security services uncovered the group in December 1942 and arrested a large number of its members. In February 1943, most of the group, as well as other partisans were released following a Soviet tank breakthrough towards the city. Another organisation, a "Revkom", was made of former members of the plant, which drew up plans to seize the plant and free Red Army prisoners. German security services exposed the organisation on 15 March 1943, and its leaders were shot shortly after.

==== Restoration ====
Restoration of the plant began in October 1943, shortly after the liberation of Zaporizhzhia by the Red Army, assisted by the sister-plant in Omsk, which supplied lathes, drills, electrical equipment, presses and welding machines. The Omsk plant retained the original name of the enterprise (No. 29), while the Zaporizhzhia plant was redesignated Plant № 478 of the People's Commissariat, later transferred to the Ministry of Aviation Industry in 1946. By May of 1944, the repair of M-88 engines was underway. From 1945 to 1947, the M-72 motorcycle engine was produced at Plan № 478.

On 5 May 1945, the People's Commissariat issued Order No. 193, establishing the Serial Design Bureau (SKB). In 1946, the bureau was converted into the experimental design bureau OKB-478 led by Alexander Ivchenko. All engines created at the design bureau were named after the designer, with the initials "AI".

=== Jet age ===
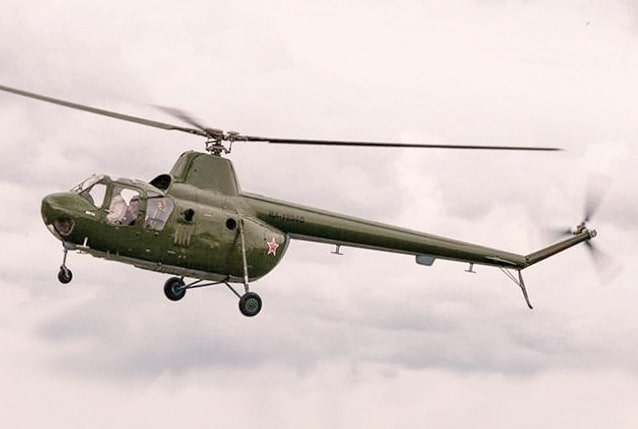
Mil Mi-1

In 1945, Ivchenko began work on the Ivchenko AI-26 seven-cylinder air-cooled radial engine. A special variant of the engine named the AI-26GR "Gelikopter" powered the Mil Mi-1, the first serial production helicopter for the Soviet Union.

== 2022 nationalisation ==
On 6 November 2022, the government of President Volodymyr Zelenskyy used martial law to nationalise the company, stating that "Such steps, which are necessary for our country in conditions of war, are carried out in accordance with current laws and will help meet the urgent needs of our defense sector." Chinese company Skyrizon accused Ukraine of "unjustified plundering."

== Components ==
- Zaporizhzhia Engine Engineering Factory, Zaporizhzhia
- Omelchenko Engineering Factory (1988), Zaporizhzhia
- Snizhne Engineering Factory (1970), Snizhne
- Volochysk Engineering Factory (1971), Volochysk
- Motor Sich Airlines (1984)
- Aleks TV (1995), local television company

In 2011 it acquired Orsha Engineering Factory, Orsha, Belarus.

== Gallery ==
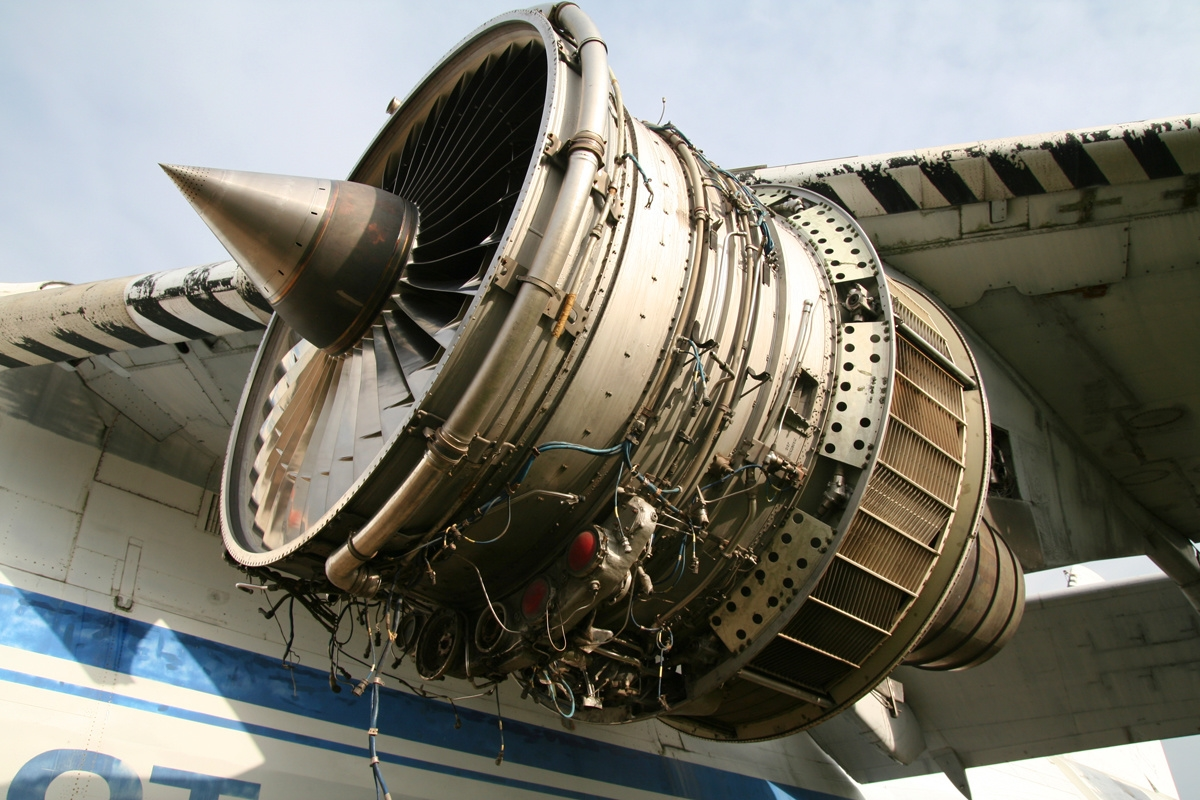
Progress D-18T engine manufactured by Motor Sich

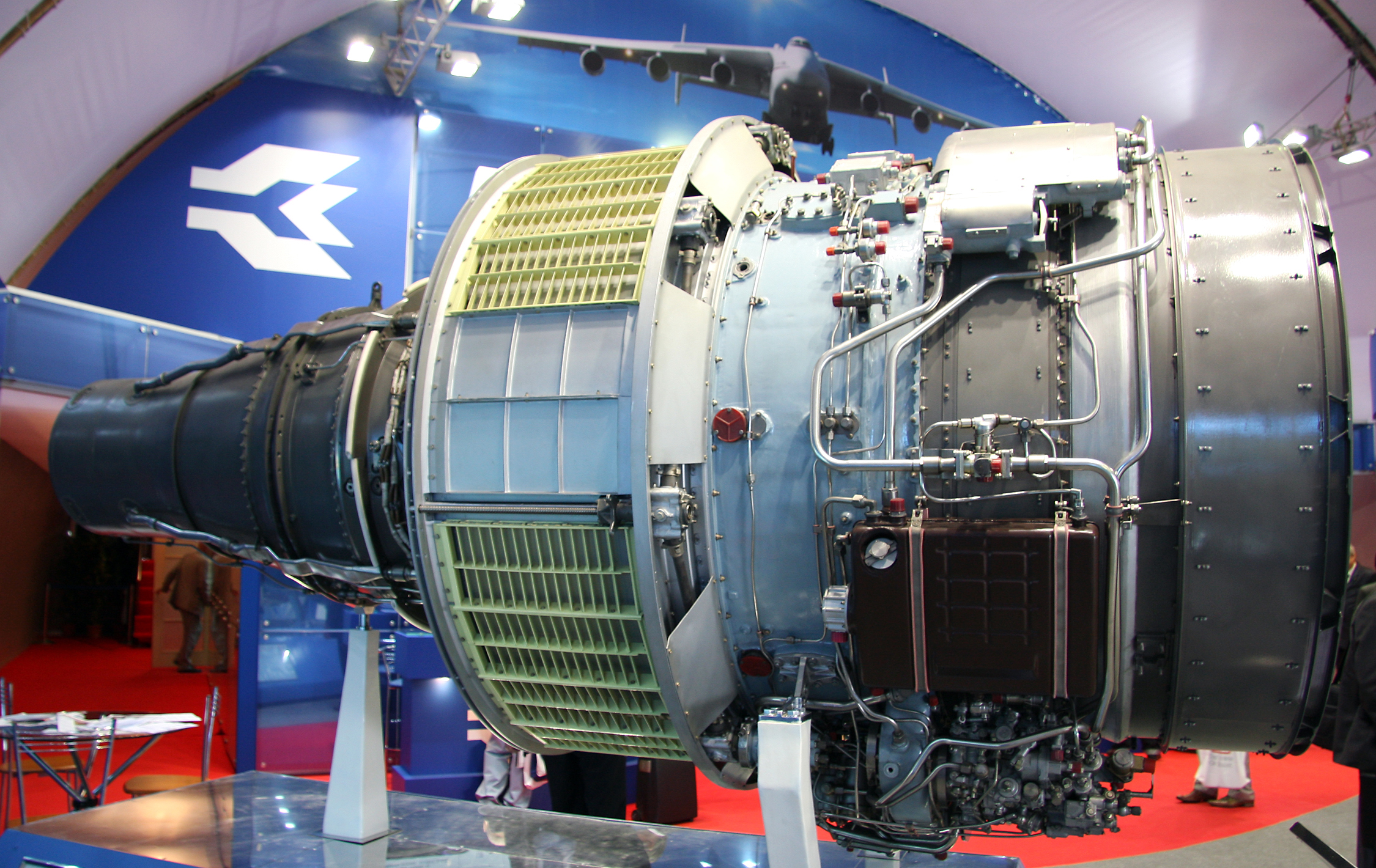
Progress D-436 engine manufactured by Motor Sich

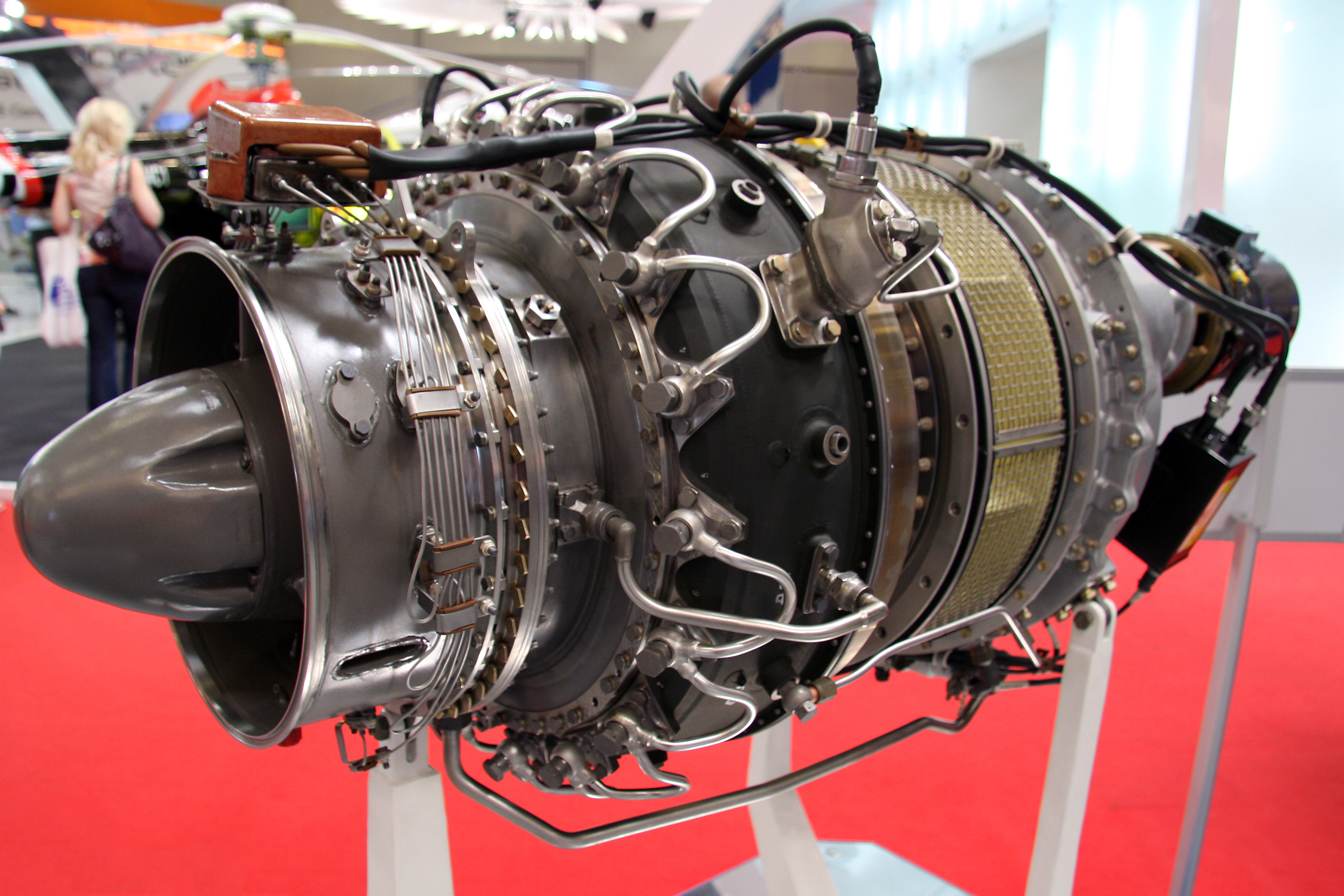
Motor Sich MS-500V engine

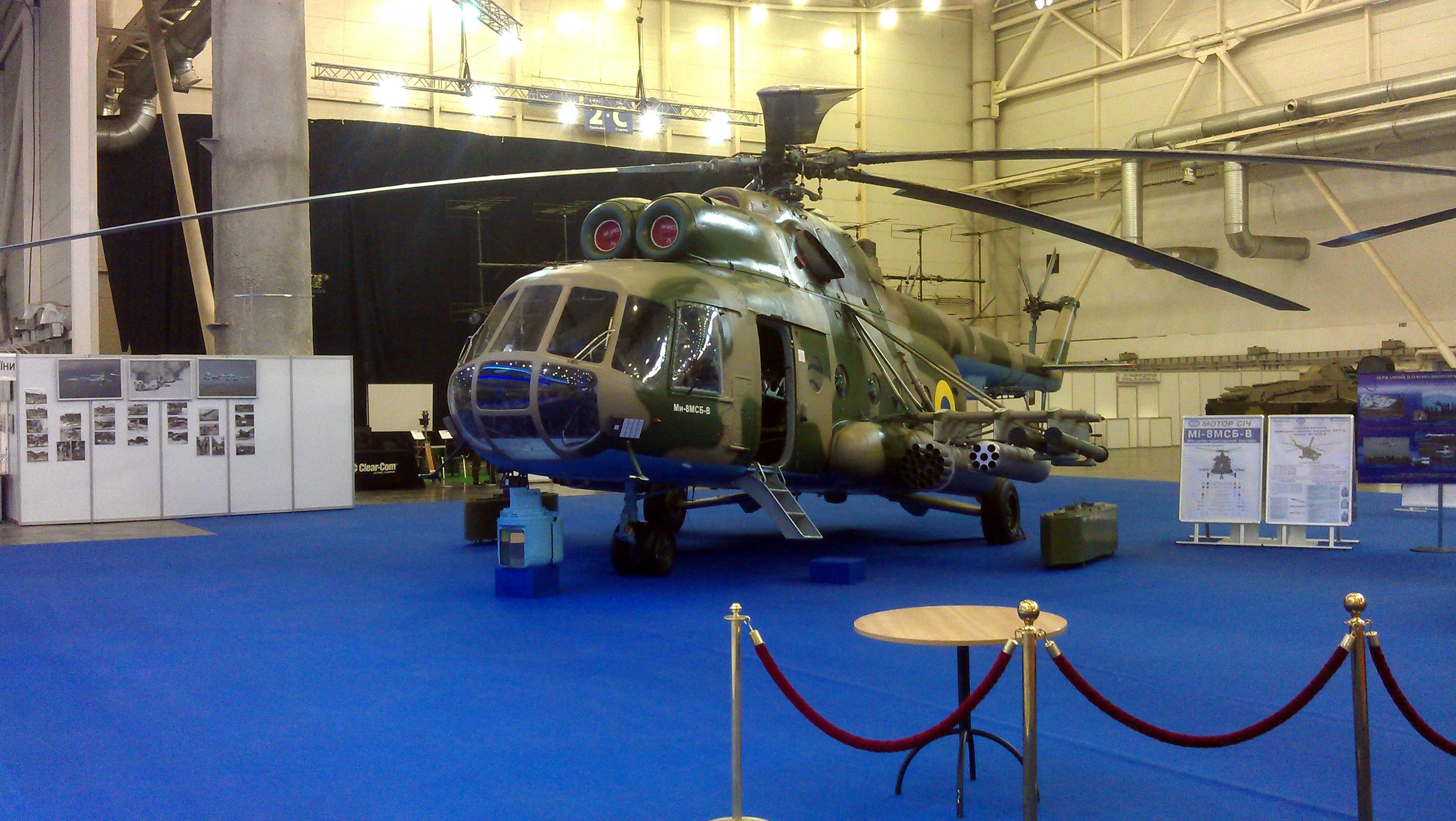
Ukrainian Modernization Mil Mi-8MSB-V

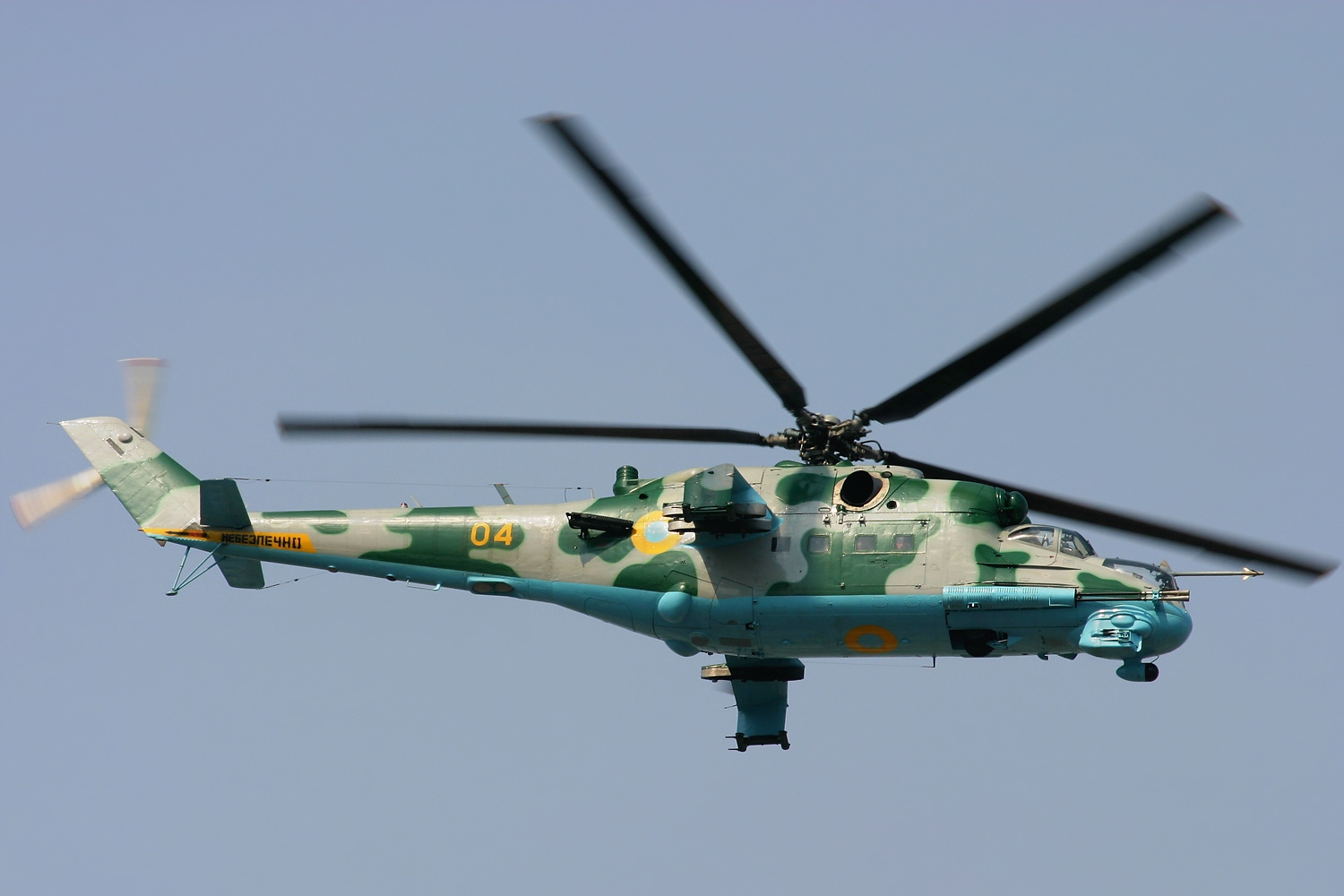
Modernized Mil Mi-24P in Ukraine Army service

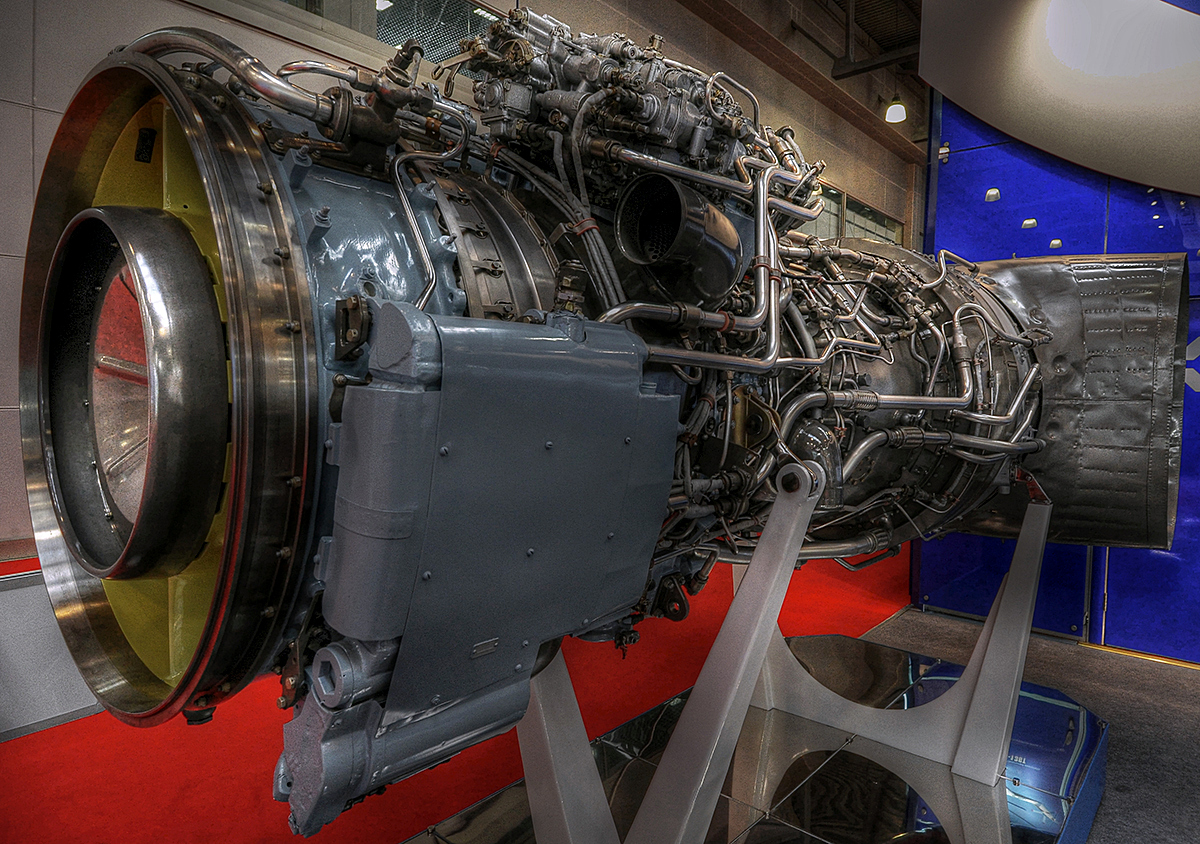
Progress AI-136T turboshaft for Mi-26

== Daughter organizations ==
- Motor Sich Airlines
- FC Motor Zaporizhzhia
- HC Motor Zaporizhzhia

== See also ==
- Ivchenko-Progress
- List of aircraft engine manufacturers
