= Antonov/Taqnia An-132 =

Canceled prototype military transport aircraft

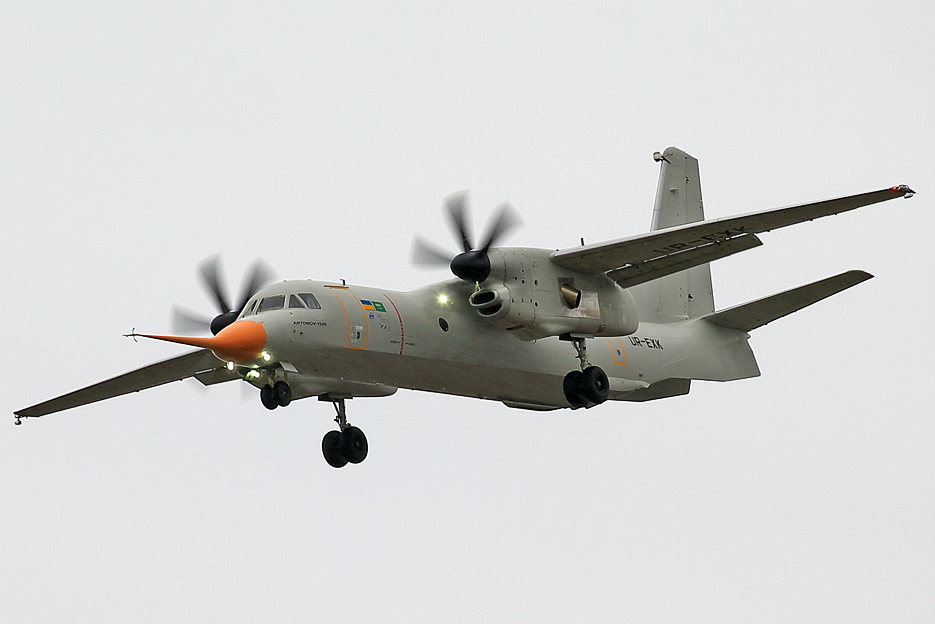
- On its 31 March 2017 maiden flight

General information
- Type: Military transport aircraft
- National origin: Ukraine; Saudi Arabia
- Manufacturer: Antonov Serial Production Plant; Taqnia Aeronautics
- Designer: Antonov State Enterprise
- Status: Cancelled
- Number built: 1

History
- Manufactured: 2016
- First flight: 31 March 2017
- Developed from: Antonov An-32

The Antonov/Taqnia An-132 was an improved version of the Antonov An-32 twin-engined turboprop military transport aircraft that was under development jointly by Saudi Arabia and Ukraine. It was to be a fifth member of the Antonov An-24 family. The project was suspended in April 2019 following the withdrawal of Saudi support, and the cancellation of orders from the Royal Saudi Air Force, that was to be the launch customer. Subsequently the An-132D prototype, the only one completed, was heavily damaged in the Battle of Antonov Airport in February 2022. Since then there has been no further update on the project from Antonov.

== Development ==
=== Origins ===
The origins of the An-132 can be found in the Antonov An-24, a Soviet short-range passenger turboprop aircraft developed in the late 1950s by the Soviets. The principal advantage of this aircraft over others was its ability to operate in rugged and undeveloped airfields. For this reason, the An-24 became a popular aircraft in Soviet aviation, and subsequently friendly countries in the Comecon. Design work was conducted by the Antonov Design Bureau, and the aircraft was manufactured in large quantities at the Kyiv Aviation Plant, Ulan-Ude Aviation Plant, and Irkutsk Aviation Plant.

In the 1960s, a military variant of the aircraft, the Antonov An-26, was produced for the Soviet Air Forces.

In the 1980s, at the request of the Indian Air Force, for operating in the high-altitude environments of Northern India, the An-26 was fitted with more powerful Ivchenko AI-20 engines. This version of the aircraft was designated as the Antonov An-32. Production of the An-32 continued after the fall of the Soviet Union at the Aviant Aviation Plant.

=== Partnership with Saudi Arabia ===
Following the 2014 Revolution of Dignity, relations between the new Ukrainian government and Russia deteriorated. Due to inheriting the industrial supply chains of the Soviet era, Antonov was heavily associated and reliant on partnered industries in Russia. As a result of this crisis, the company began to search for other partners. In late 2014, Saudi Arabia initiated negotiations for the development of new aircraft with Ukraine, focusing on a modernised version of the An-32, replacing Soviet and Russian systems with western components.

The new An-132 would receive a number of updates from the old An-32. The Ivchenko AI-20 engines manufactured by Motor Sich would be replaced with Pratt & Whitney Canada PW150 turboprop engines, used in many regional airliners. The American firm Honeywell would provide aircraft avionics, and the auxiliary power unit would be supplied by United Technologies. The aircraft would also feature British-made propellers, French air management systems, and many other European and American components that would replace the original Russian parts. This modernisation process would result in the An-132 possessing twice the range of the original An-32, as well as improving cargo capacity from 6,700 kg to 9,200 kg.

A Saudi Arabian government owned company named Taqnia served as the major partner in the project. The company wished to develop a production line in Riyadh by 2017, with the goal of both Saudi Arabian and Ukrainian production lines being operational in 2018.

== Design ==
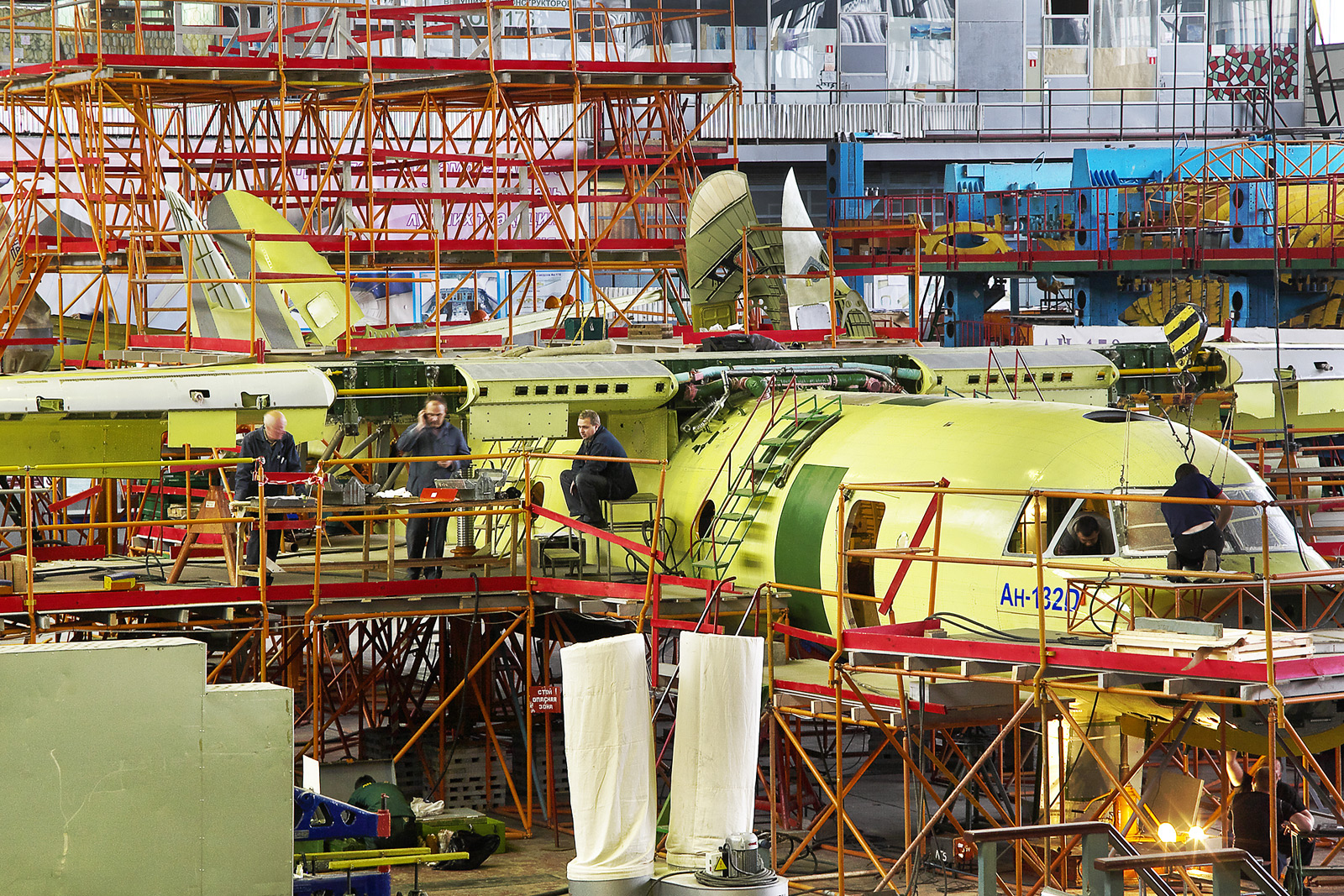
The prototype during production.

The An-132 is a turboprop-powered transport aircraft. While the An-132 inherits the aerodynamic features of its predecessor, the An-32, many of its Soviet and Russian origin parts are replaced by Western European and American made components.

It is powered by a pair of Pratt & Whitney Canada PW150 turboprop engines, which drive an arrangement of six-bladed R408 propellers supplied by Dowty Propellers. This arrangement produces 5,071 shp, allowing the aircraft to achieve "hot and high" takeoff performance, and operate in sparse conditions.

The aircraft features Honeywell avionics, a Liebherr air management system and a Hamilton Sundstrand-supplied Auxiliary Power Unit (APU).

== Operational history ==
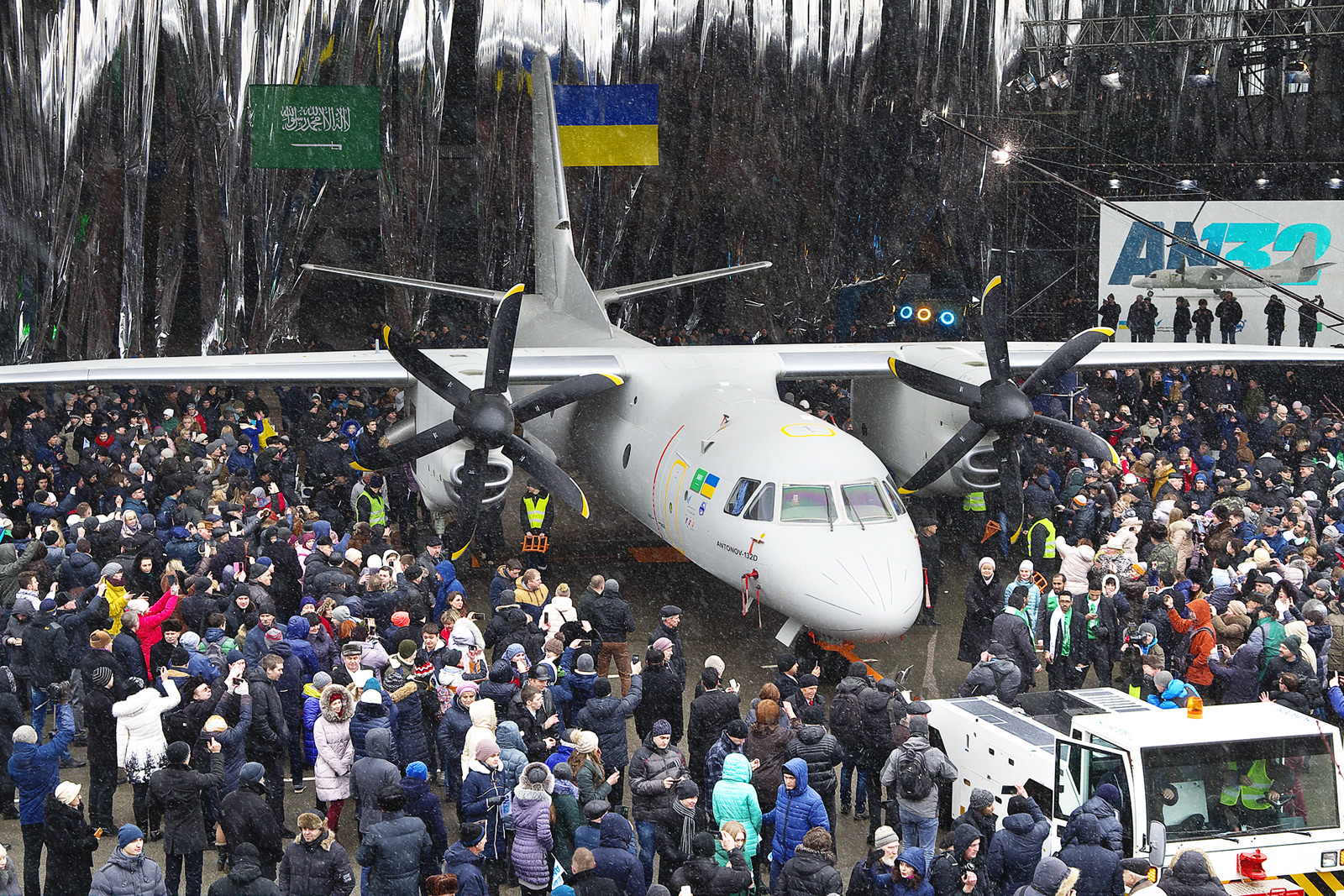
20 December 2016 roll out

The Antonov An-132 struggled to compete with European and American competitors and lacked access to its previous Russian aligned customers. An initial order of 80 aircraft by the Royal Saudi Air Force was publicised in 2015 as being highly useful for both military and civilian purposes. However, with the RSAF already negotiating the purchase of extra Lockheed Martin C-130J Super Hercules, as well as EADS CASA C-295 at the time, little space was left for the An-132. The initial Saudi Arabian commitment to the project was $150 million USD, which covered one third of the development costs, and two thirds of testing costs. The production of an An-132D technology demonstrator began in 2015. On a snowy winter morning of December 2016, the completed prototype was rolled out at Sviatoshyn Airfield in Kyiv. The aircraft was open for public examination, with Antonov praising its characteristics in demanding situations such as desert environments.

In March 2017, the prototype embarked on its maiden flight to Riyadh, for testing in desert conditions. At the same time, 50 Saudi engineers undertook training at the Antonov Technical School. However, production lines had yet to have been established in Saudi Arabia. At the Paris Air Show in June 2017, it was revealed that the Saudi Arabian production line was scheduled to begin production. A Saudi Arabian derived variant was announced, stating that a significant part of the aircraft would be built using composite materials produced in Saudi Arabia. In 2017 and 2018, the An-132 prototype continued with flight tests.

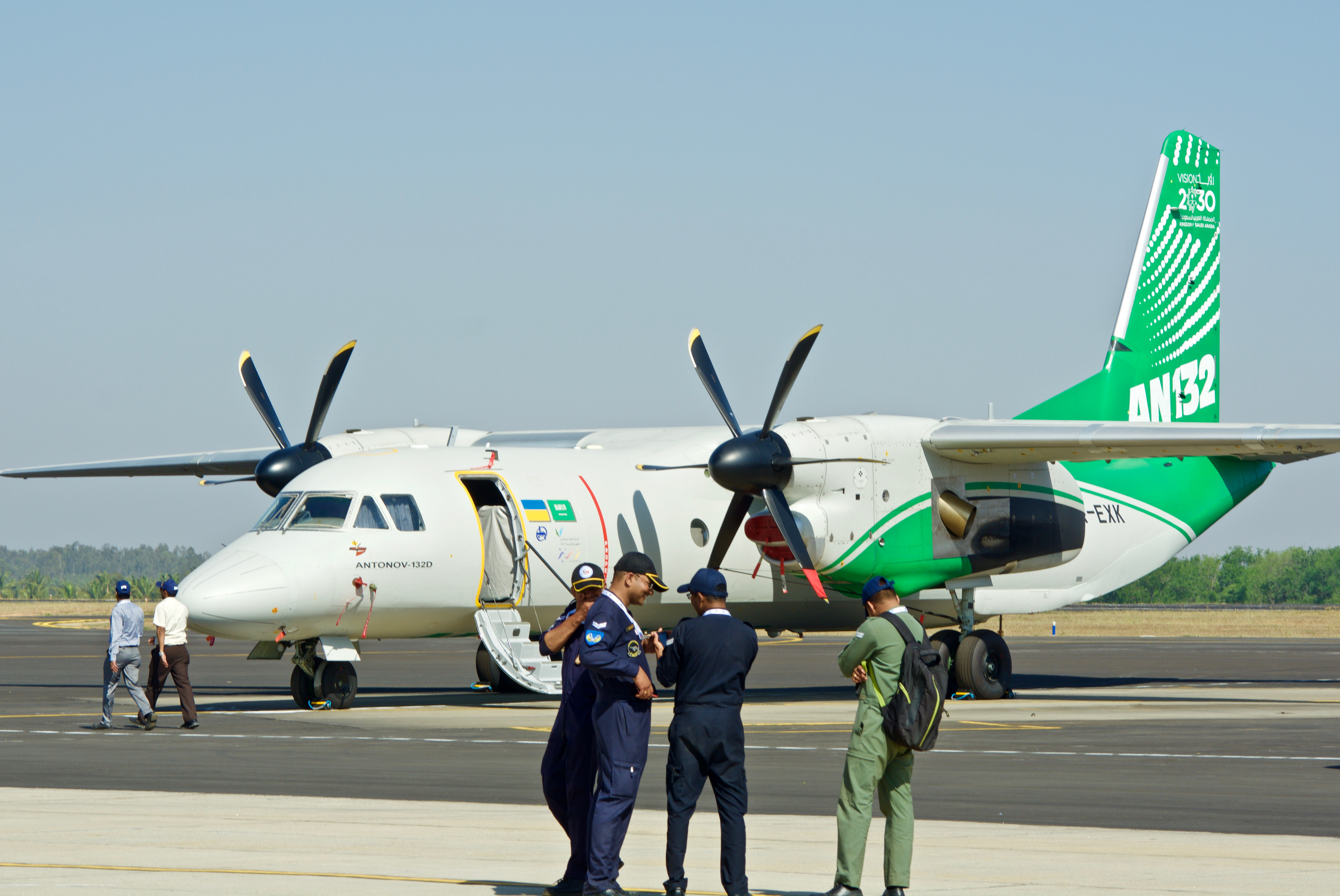
An-132 at Aero India 2019.

At Aero India in February 2019, representatives from Ukraine and India discussed offering the An-132 as a potential replacement for their existing fleet of An-32 transport aircraft. The aircraft performed a number of demonstration flights during the air show.

In April 2019, Antonov CEO Oleksandr Donets announced that cooperation had been suspended, indicating that Taqnia was no longer a partner in the project. Saudi Arabia did not comment on this occurrence. The primary reason for this change suggested by aviation experts is that the RSAF decided to focus their efforts towards building their fleet of already operated aircraft, such as the C-130J Super Hercules. Others have suggested that the project was dropped as part of the anti-corruption campaign and consolidation of government spending by Crown Prince Mohammed bin Salman, or that the project was never taken seriously by Saudi Arabia to begin with.

In 2021, the aircraft's registration was revoked by the State Aviation Administration of Ukraine as its airworthiness certificate had expired. The prototype was very heavily damaged during the Battle of Antonov Airport in 2022.

== Variants ==
- An-132D: Initial production version of the aircraft. 1 produced.

Undeveloped variants

Antonov has studied a number of An-132 variants that have not gone beyond the concept stage.

- AN-132ISR: Electronic warfare variant.
- AN-132MPA: Maritime patrol variant.
- AN-132 Gunship: Lightly armed gunship for counter insurgency activities.
- AN-132ME: Medical evacuation variant.
- AN-132SAR: Coast guard and search & rescue variant.
- AN-132FF: Fire fighting variant.

== Operators ==
=== Former operators ===
Ukraine

- Antonov State Enterprise - 1 prototype An-132D. In 2021, the aircraft's registration was revoked by the State Aviation Administration of Ukraine as its airworthiness certificate had expired.

=== Cancelled orders ===
Saudi Arabia

- Royal Saudi Air Force - Initial order of 80 aircraft in 2015, then reduced to a commitment to purchase six aircraft. Cancelled in favour of increasing the size of its fleet of Lockheed Martin C-130J Super Hercules tactical transport aircraft.

== Accidents and incidents ==
- On 24 February 2022, the only prototype An-132 with registration number UR-EXK was damaged during the Battle of Antonov Airport. The left wing of the aircraft was damaged beyond repair, in addition to significant shrapnel damage to the engine and fuselage. At the time, the aircraft was not airworthy.

== Specifications ==
Data from An-132

General characteristics

- Capacity: according to configuration, it can carry:
  - 9,200 kg (20,300 lb) cargo.
  - 75 troops.
  - 27 stretchers.
- Length: 24.53 m (80 ft 6 in)
- Wingspan: 29.20 m (95 ft 10 in)
- Height: 8.80 m (28 ft 10 in)
- Max takeoff weight: 28,500 kg (62,832 lb)
- Powerplant: 2 × Pratt & Whitney Canada PW150A turboprops, 3,781 kW (5,071 shp) each
- Propellers: Six-bladed Dowty Propellers R408, 4.11 m (13 ft 6 in) diameter with a blade tip sweep of 18 degrees

Performance

- Cruise speed: 550 km/h (340 mph, 300 kn)
- Range: 4,400 km (2,700 mi, 2,400 nmi)
- Service ceiling: 9,000 m (30,000 ft)

== See also ==
Related development

- Antonov An-26
- Antonov An-32

Aircraft of comparable role, configuration, and era

- Alenia C-27J Spartan
- EADS CASA C-295
- Ilyushin Il-112
