= Antonov A-15 =

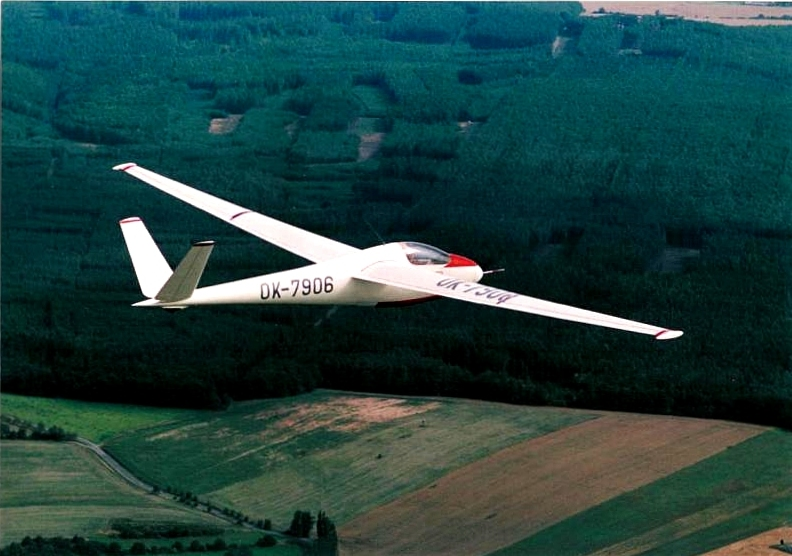
- Antonov A-15 registered in the Czech Republic

General information
- Type: Glider
- National origin: USSR
- Manufacturer: Antonov
- Designer: Oleg Antonov
- Status: Small numbers still airworthy
- Number built: 350

History
- First flight: 26 March 1960

The Antonov A-15 is a Soviet mid-wing, V-tailed single-seat, FAI Open Class glider that was designed by Oleg Antonov and produced by Antonov.

== Design and development ==
The A-15 was a follow-on design, based on the bureau's experience gained with the A-11 and A-13 gliders. This new open class design quickly proved its worth as a record-setter.

The aircraft is made from aluminium. Unusually for a Cold War Soviet aircraft, its 17 m (55.8 ft) span wing employs an American NACA 64-618 airfoil at the wing root, transitioning to an NACA 64-616 section at the wingtip. The A-15 carries 50 kg (110 lb) of water ballast. The landing gear is a retractable monowheel.

A total of 350 A-15s were built.

== Operational history ==
The A-15 was used to set many world records, including a world goal distance record of 714.023 km (444 mi), flown in June 1960.

In August 2011, there was one A-15 registered with the Federal Aviation Administration in the United States.

== Specifications (Antonov A-15) ==
Data from The World's Sailplanes:Die Segelflugzeuge der Welt:Les Planeurs du Monde Volume II Sailplane Directory

General characteristics

- Crew: one
- Length: 7.2 m (23 ft 7 in)
- Wingspan: 17 m (55 ft 9 in)
- Height: 1.15 m (3 ft 9 in) at cockpit
- Wing area: 12 m^{2} (130 sq ft)
- Aspect ratio: 24
- Airfoil: Root: NACA 64_{3}618, Tip: NACA 63_{3}616
- Empty weight: 273 kg (602 lb)
- Gross weight: 380 kg (838 lb)

Performance

- Stall speed: 55 km/h (34 mph, 30 kn)
- Never exceed speed: 250 km/h (160 mph, 130 kn)
- Rough air speed max: 250 km/h (155.3 mph; 135.0 kn)
- Aerotow speed: 140 km/h (87.0 mph; 75.6 kn)
- Winch launch speed: 120 km/h (74.6 mph; 64.8 kn)
- g limits: +7.5 -3 at 250 km/h (155.3 mph; 135.0 kn)
- Maximum glide ratio: 40 at 100 km/h (62.1 mph; 54.0 kn)
- Rate of sink: 0.6 m/s (120 ft/min) at 90 km/h (55.9 mph; 48.6 kn)
- Wing loading: 31.6 kg/m^{2} (6.5 lb/sq ft)

== See also ==
Related development

- Antonov A-9
- Antonov A-11
- Antonov A-13

Related lists

- List of gliders
