= Antonov A-13 =

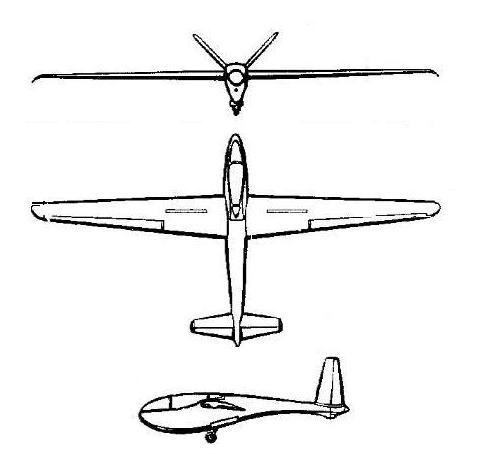

General information
- Type: Sailplane
- Manufacturer: Antonov
- Number built: ~200

History
- First flight: 1958

The Antonov A-13 was a Soviet aerobatic sailplane flown in the 1950s and 1960s. It was a small, single-seat, all-metal aircraft developed from the A-11 which could optionally be fitted with that aircraft's longer-span wings. It was a mid-wing monoplane with a tadpole-like fuselage and a V-tail.

In February 1962, an A-13 was fitted with a small turbojet engine to set a world airspeed record of 196 km/h (122 mph) for an aircraft weighing up to 500 kg. This jet-powered version was known as the An-13

== Variants ==
- A-13 : Single-seat aerobatic sailplane.
- A-13M : Motor glider version, fitted with a low-powered piston engine.
- An-13 : Jet-powered version.

== Specifications (Antonov A-13) ==
Data from The World's Sailplanes:Die Segelflugzeuge der Welt:Les Planeurs du Monde Volume II

General characteristics

- Crew: one
- Length: 6 m (19 ft 8 in)
- Wingspan: 12.1 m (39 ft 8 in)
- Height: 1.2 m (3 ft 11 in) at cockpit
- Wing area: 10.44 m^{2} (112.4 sq ft)
- Aspect ratio: 13.8
- Airfoil: TsAGI R-32-15 (Note: Some sources refer to P-32-15; Simons refers to R-32-15 for this aerofoil. The difference is generated by transliteration between Cyrillic script and Roman where p in Cyrillic is R in Roman script.)
- Empty weight: 254 kg (560 lb)
- Gross weight: 360 kg (794 lb)

Performance

- Stall speed: 70 km/h (43 mph, 38 kn)
- Never exceed speed: 350 km/h (220 mph, 190 kn)
- Rough air speed max: 350 km/h (220 mph; 190 kn)
- Aerotow speed: 200 km/h (120 mph; 110 kn)
- Winch launch speed: 120 km/h (75 mph; 65 kn)
- g limits: +8.66 -3.9 at 300 km/h (190 mph; 160 kn)
- Maximum glide ratio: 25 at 112 km/h (70 mph; 60 kn)
- Rate of sink: 1.14 m/s (224 ft/min) at 97 km/h (60 mph; 52 kn)
- Wing loading: 34.5 kg/m^{2} (7.1 lb/sq ft)

== See also ==
Related development

- Antonov A-9
- Antonov A-11
- Antonov A-15

Related lists

- List of gliders
