= Antonov =

Ukrainian state-owned aircraft manufacturer

Antonov JSC

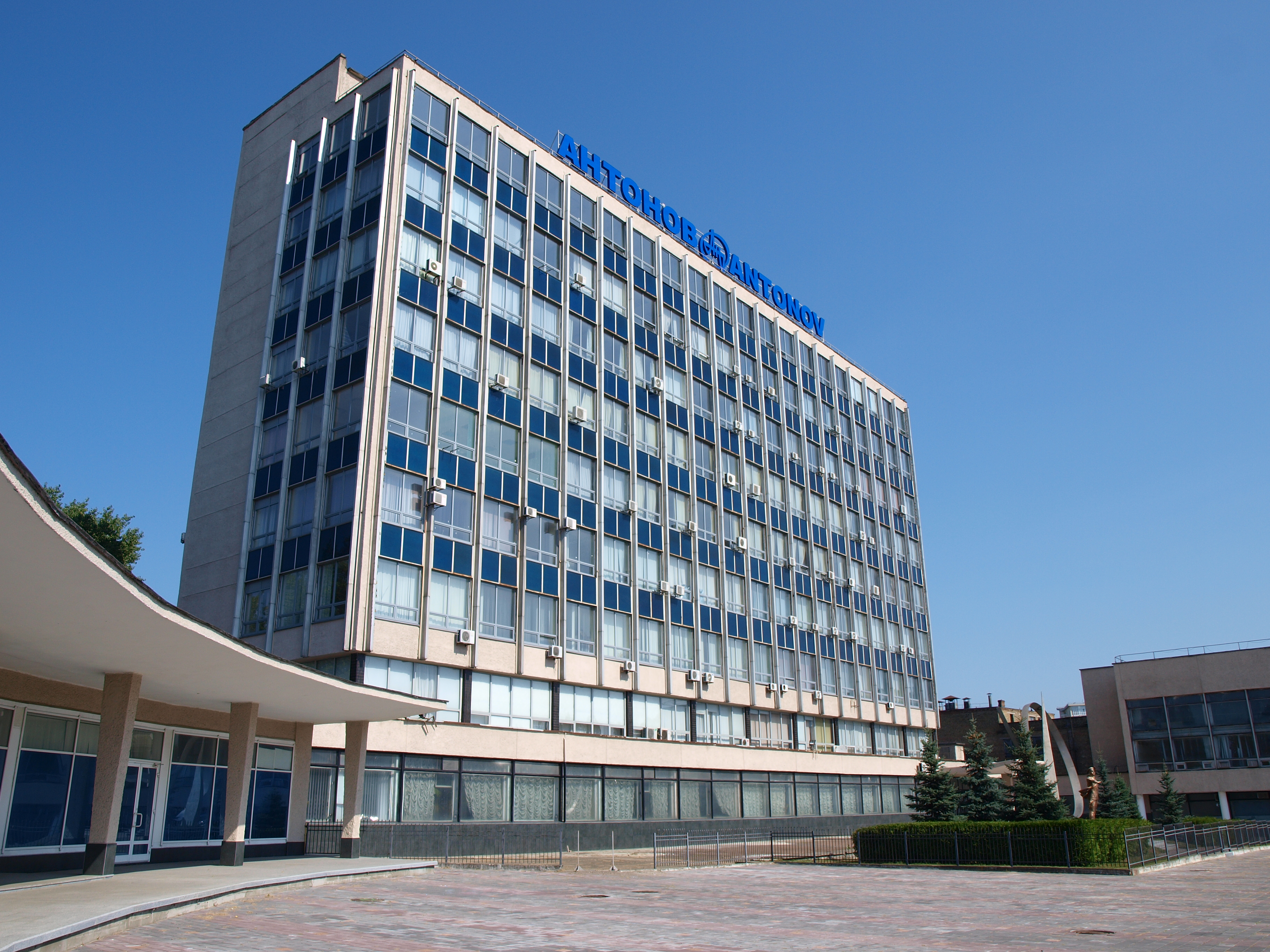
- Trade name: Antonov Company
- Native name: Акціонерне товариство «Антонов»
- Formerly: Antonov State Enterprise
- Type: State-owned company
- Industry: Aerospace and defence
- Founded: 31 May 1946; 80 years ago
- Founder: Oleg Antonov
- Headquarters: Kyiv, Ukraine
- Key people: Oleksandr Donets (president of the enterprise)
- Products: Aircraft for various applications; Aircraft maintenance; Cargo air transport
- Total assets: ▲ ₴13.8 bn (2020)
- Total equity: ▲ ₴9.0 bn (2020)
- Owner: Government of Ukraine
- Number of employees: 13,700 (2014)
- Parent: Ukrainian Defense Industry
- Divisions: Antonov Serial Production Plant; Antonov Airlines; Hostomel Airport
- Website: www.antonov.com/en

Antonov (d/b/a Antonov Company, (Note: Ukrainian: Державне підприємство «Антонов») formerly the Aeronautical Scientific-Technical Complex named after Antonov or Antonov ASTC, (Note: Ukrainian: Авіаційний науково-технічний комплекс імені Антонова, [АНТК ім. Антонова]) and earlier the Antonov Design Bureau, for its chief designer, Oleg Antonov) is a Ukrainian aircraft manufacturing and services company. Antonov's particular expertise is in the fields of very large aeroplanes and aeroplanes using unprepared runways. Antonov (model prefix "An-") has built a total of approximately 22,000 aircraft, and thousands of its planes are operating in the former Soviet Union and in developing countries.

Antonov Company is a state-owned commercial company originally established in Novosibirsk, Russian Soviet Federative Socialist Republic (RSFSR). In 1952, the company relocated to Kiev, Ukrainian SSR, then part of the Soviet Union. On 12 May 2015, it was transferred from the Ministry of Economic Development and Trade to the Ukroboronprom (also known as Ukrainian Defense Industry).

In June 2016, Ukraine's major state-owned arms manufacturer Ukroboronprom announced the creation of the Ukrainian Aircraft Corporation within its structure, to combine all aircraft manufacturing enterprises in Ukraine.

== History ==
=== Soviet era ===
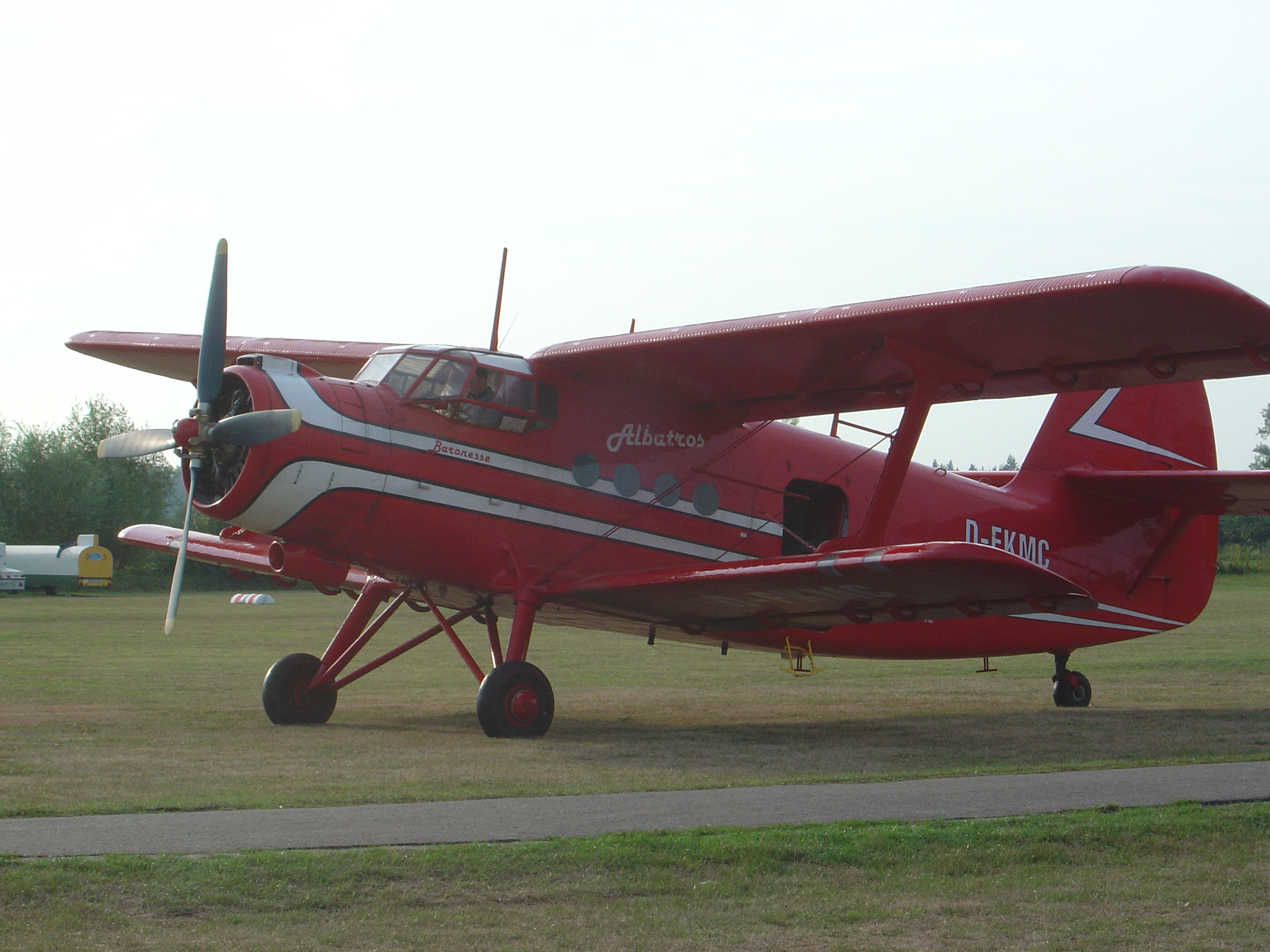
Antonov An-2, mass-produced Soviet utility aeroplane.

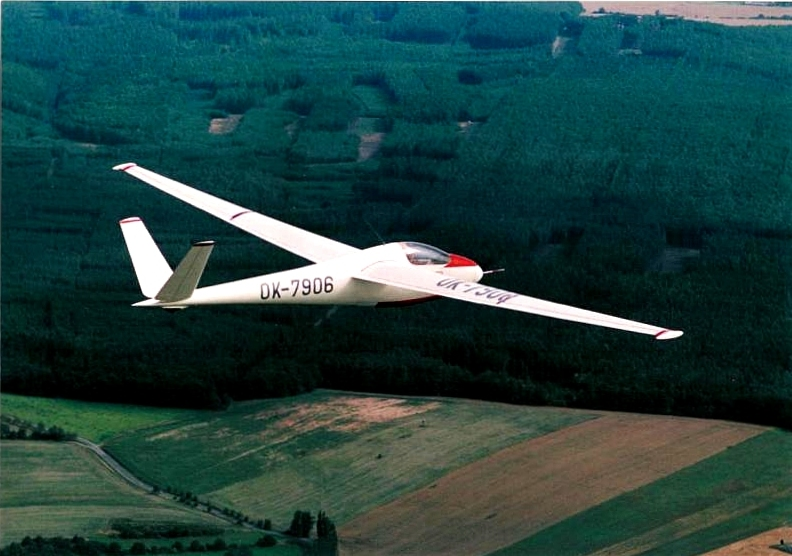
Antonov A-15 in Czech markings

==== Foundation and relocation ====
The company was established in 1946 at the Novosibirsk Aircraft Production Association as the top-secret Soviet Research and Design Bureau No. 153 (OKB-153). It was headed by Oleg Antonov and specialised in turboprop military transport aircraft. The task was to create an agricultural aircraft CX-1 (An-2), the first flight of which occurred on 31 August 1947. The An-2 biplane was a major achievement of this period, with hundreds of these aircraft still operating as of 2013. In addition to this biplane and its modifications, a small series of gliders A-9 and A-10 were created and built in the pilot production in Novosibirsk. In 1952, the Bureau was relocated to Kyiv, a city with a rich aviation history and an aircraft-manufacturing infrastructure restored after the destruction caused by World War II.

==== First serial aircraft and expansion ====
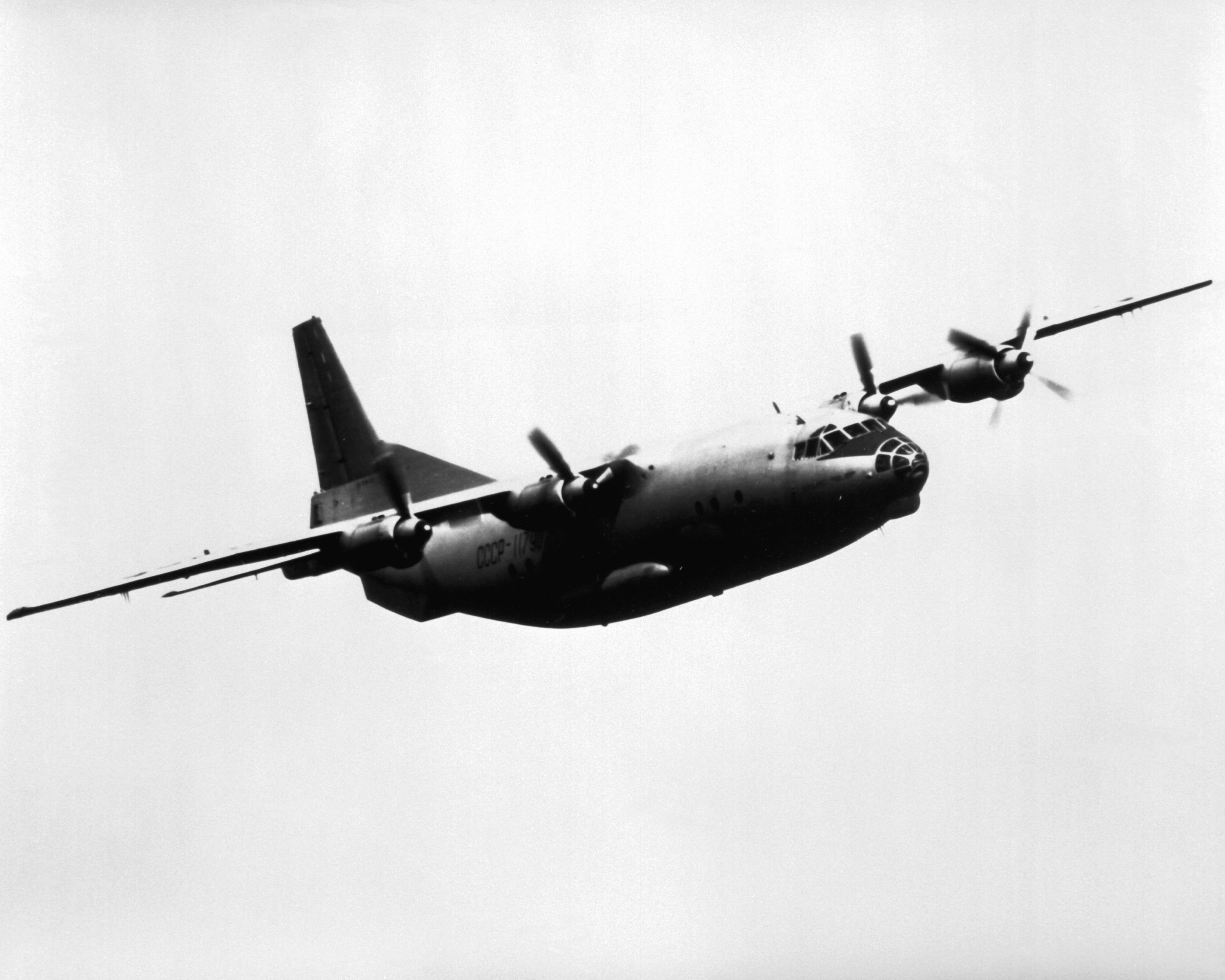
An-12, Cold War-era tactical transport, in flight

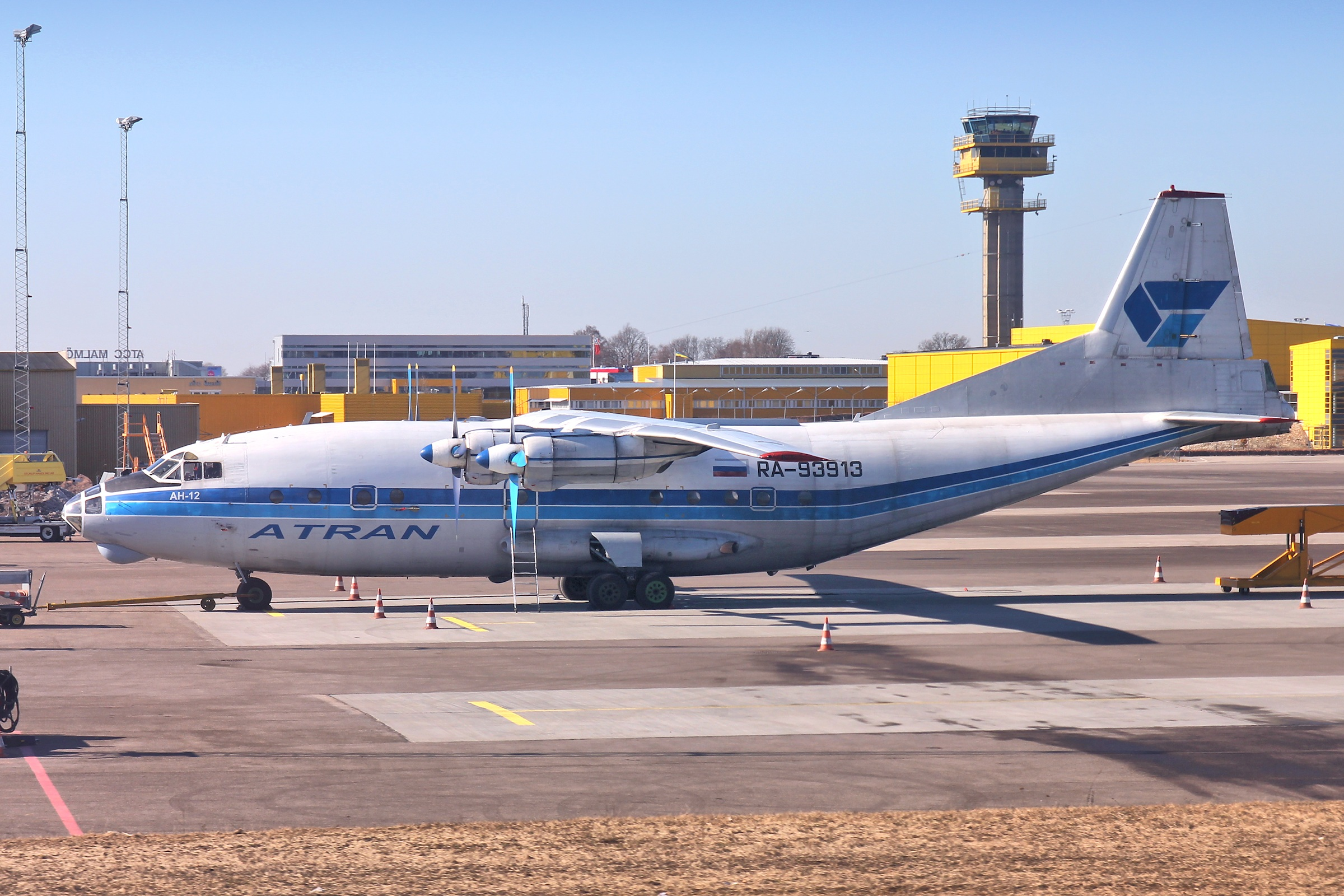
47-year-old An-12 still in operational condition in 2011

The 1957 introduction of the An-10/An-12 family of mid-range turboprop aeroplanes began the successful production of thousands of these aircraft. Their use for both heavy combat and civilian purposes around the globe continues to the present; the An-10/An-12 were used most notably in the Vietnam War, the Soviet–Afghan War and the Chernobyl disaster relief megaoperation.

In 1959, the bureau began construction of the separate Flight Testing and Improvement Base in suburban Hostomel (now the Antonov Airport).

In 1965, the Antonov An-22 heavy military transport entered serial production to supplement the An-12 in major military and humanitarian airlifts by the Soviet Union. The model became the first Soviet wide-body aircraft, and it remains the world's largest turboprop-powered aircraft. Antonov designed and presented a nuclear-powered version of the An-22. It was never flight tested.

In 1966, after the major expansion in the Sviatoshyn neighbourhood of the city, the company was renamed to another disguise name: "Kiev Mechanical Plant". Two independent aircraft production and repair facilities, under engineering supervision of the Antonov Bureau, also appeared in Kiev during this period.

==== Prominence and Antonov's retirement ====
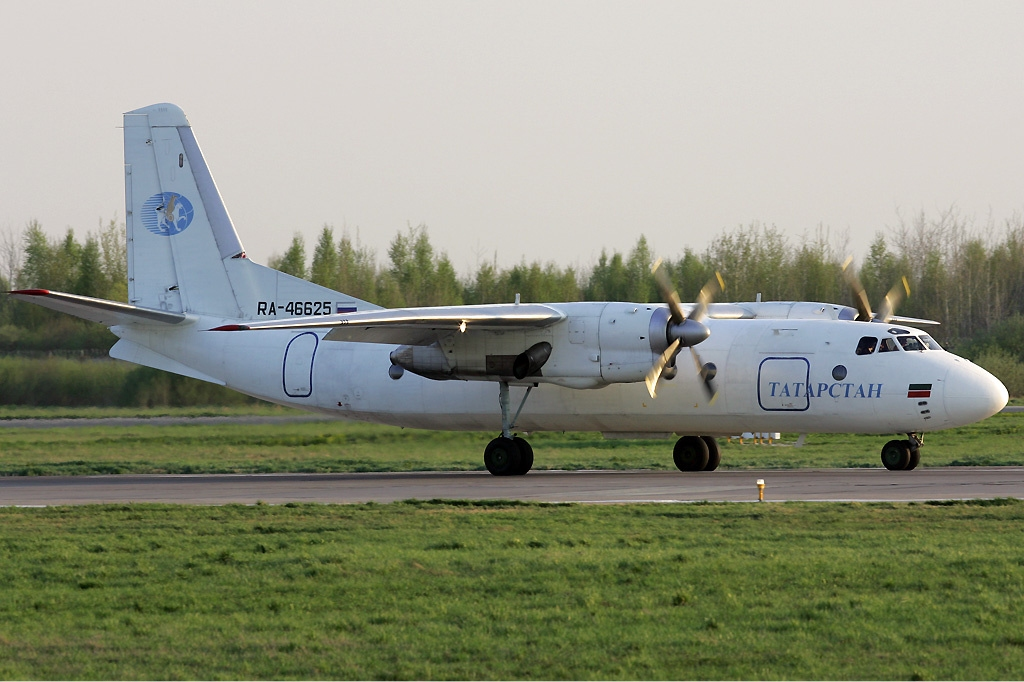
Antonov An-24, the Soviet Union's most common regional airliner

In the 1970s and early 1980s, the company established itself as the Soviet Union's main designer of military transport aircraft with dozens of new modifications in development and production. After Oleg Antonov's death in 1984, the company was officially renamed as the Research and Design Bureau named after O.K. Antonov (Russian: Опытно-конструкторское бюро имени О.К. Антонова) while continuing the use of "Kiev Mechanical Plant" alias for some purposes.

==== Late Soviet-era: superlarge projects and first commercialisation ====
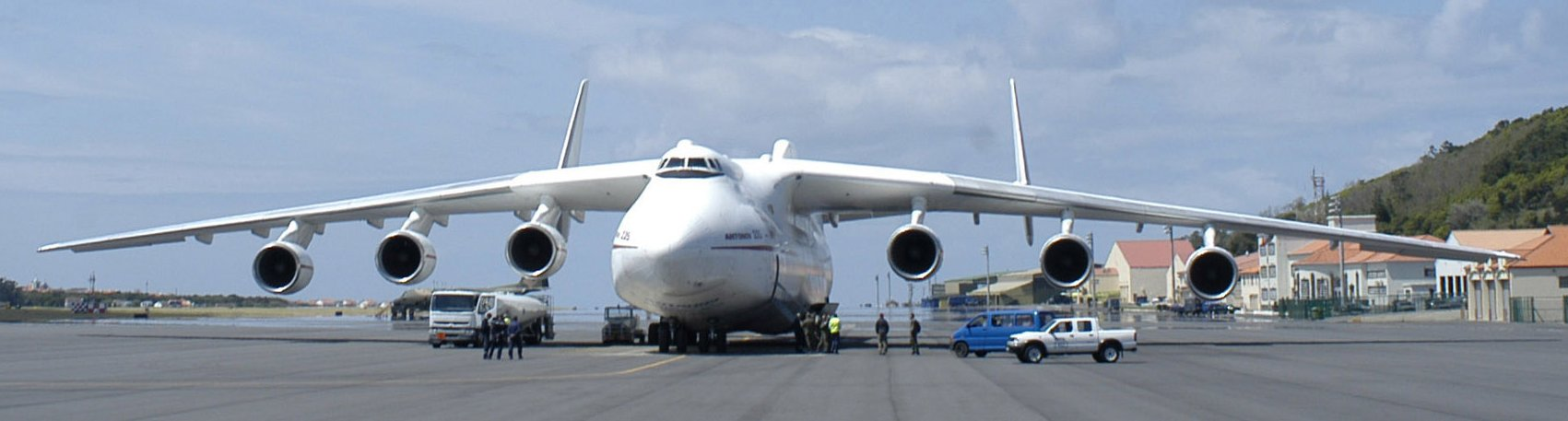
An-225 which was previously the largest operative aircraft in the world was destroyed in 2022.

In the late 1980s, the Antonov Bureau achieved global prominence after the introduction of its extra large aeroplanes. The An-124 "Ruslan" (1982) became the Soviet Union's mass-produced strategic airlifter under the leadership of Chief Designer Viktor Tolmachev. The Bureau enlarged the "Ruslan" design even more for the Soviet spaceplane programme logistics, creating the An-225 "Mriya" in 1985. "Mriya" was the world's largest and heaviest aeroplane.

The end of the Cold War and perestroika allowed the Antonov company's first step to commercialisation and foreign expansion. In 1989, the Antonov Airlines subsidiary was created for its own aircraft maintenance and cargo projects.

=== Independent Ukraine ===
Antonov Design Bureau remained a state-owned company after Ukraine achieved its independence in 1991 and is since regarded as a strategic national asset.

Since independence, Antonov has certified and marketed both Soviet-era and newly developed models for sale in new markets outside of the former soviet sphere of influence. New models introduced to serial production and delivered to customers include the Antonov An-140, Antonov An-148 and Antonov An-158 regional airliners.

Among several modernisation projects, Antonov received orders for upgrading "hundreds" of its An-2 utility planes still in operation in Azerbaijan, Cuba and Russia to the An-2-100 upgrade version.

In 2014, following the Russian annexation of Crimea, Ukraine cancelled contracts with Russia, leading to a significant income reduction in Ukraine's defense and aviation industries. However Ukraine has been slowly recovering the deficit from breaking ties with Russia by entering new markets such as the Persian Gulf region and expanding its presence in old ones such as India.

In July 2018, Antonov was able to secure a deal with Boeing to procure airplane parts which were no longer available due to breakdown of relations with Russia.

==== Production facilities' consolidation ====
During the Soviet period, not all Antonov-designed aircraft were manufactured by the company itself. This was a result of Soviet industrial strategy that split military production between different regions of the Soviet Union to minimise potential war loss risks. As a result, Antonov aeroplanes were often assembled by the specialist contract manufacturers.

In 2009, the once-independent "Aviant" aeroplane-assembling plant in Kyiv became part of Antonov, facilitating a full serial manufacturing cycle of the company. However, the old tradition of co-manufacturing with contractors is continued, both with Soviet-time partners and with new licensees like Iran's Iran Aircraft Manufacturing Industrial Company.

In 2014, Antonov produced and delivered only two An-158 airplanes. This trend continued into 2015, producing one An-148 and one An-158. Aircraft production came to an effective standstill following the deterioration of relations with Russia, as all aircraft in production were heavily reliant on Russian suppliers and expertise.

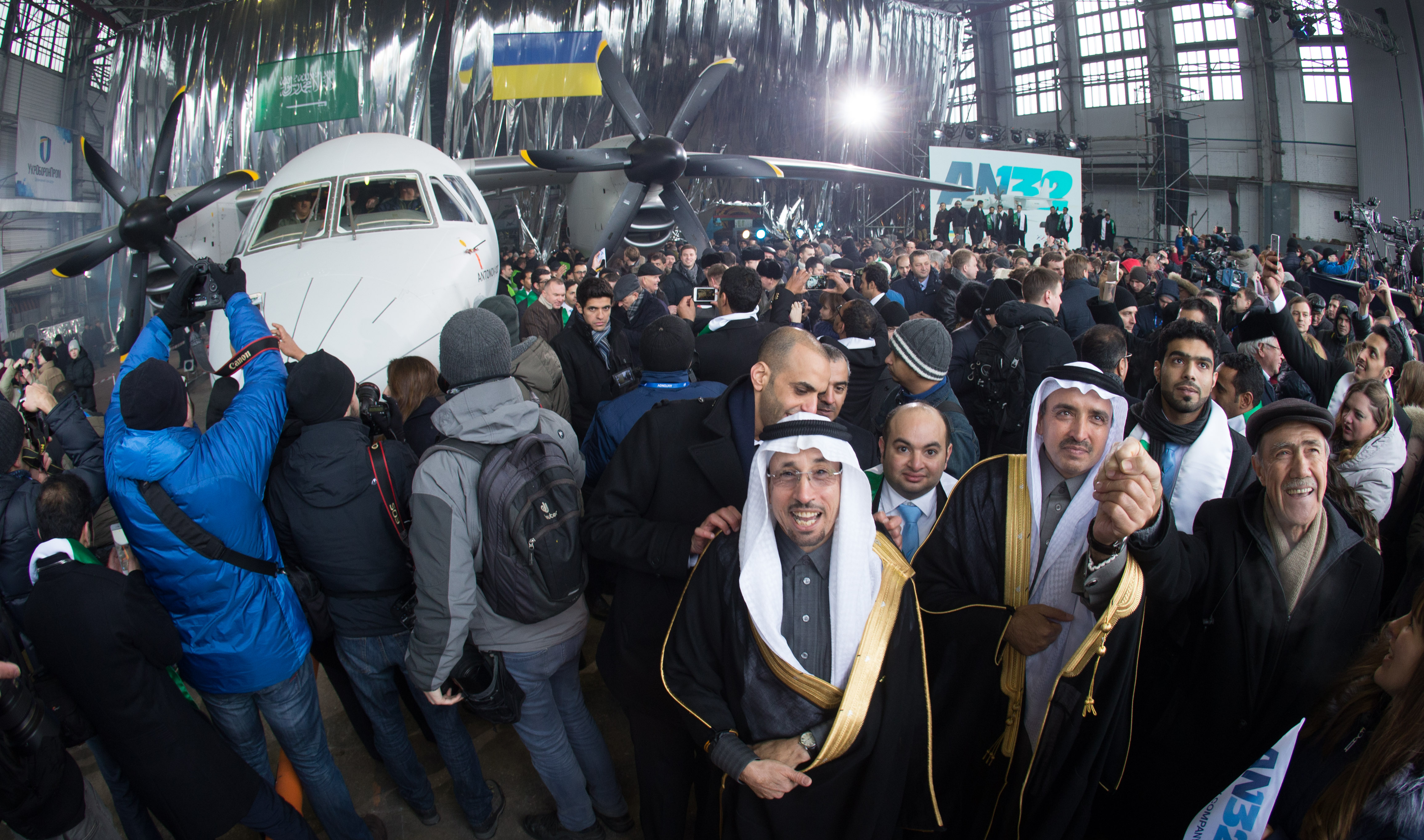
Antonov/Taqnia An-132 roll out ceremony in Kyiv, 20 December 2016

In June 2016, Ukraine's major state-owned arms manufacturer Ukroboronprom announced the creation of the Ukrainian Aircraft Corporation within its structure, thereby combining all aircraft manufacturing enterprises, including the assets of Antonov into a single cluster, according to Ukroboronprom's press service.

On 19 July 2017, the Ukrainian government approved the liquidation of Antonov's assets. The State Concern "Antonov" (a business group, created in 2005 from the merger of several legally independent companies into a single economic entity under unified management) will be liquidated as a residual corporate entity. Antonov State Company, Kharkiv State Aviation Manufacturing Enterprise and Plant No.410 of Civil Aviation were transferred under the management of another state-owned concern Ukroboronprom in 2015. Antonov State Company continues to function as an enterprise.

On 31 March 2017, the first prototype of a new multifunctional cargo plane An-132 – a demonstration plane An-132D – took to the air from the runway of Sviatoshyn airfield. The An-132 development program had been implemented in the framework of a contract with a customer from Saudi Arabia.

On 24 February 2022, at the beginning of Russia invasion on Ukraine, the first attacks were launched at Kyiv-Antonov-2 airfield, the site of Antonov's test flights and home base of the planes of Antonov Airlines. The Аn-225 Mriya, An-26, An-74 and administrative premises were destroyed. Other aircraft – Аn-12, Аn-22, Аn-28, Аn-132D and Аn-124-100-150 – along with hangars and other infrastructure were severely damaged.

The Security Service of Ukraine established that the former director general of Antonov Company Serhiy Bychkov had not provided access to the site for the National Guard in January and February 2022 and thus obstructed preparations for defence. The investigators considered that Bychkov's negligence is the direct cause of the loss of Mriya, because the plane could have been sent to Germany long before February 24. In March 2023, Serhiy Bychkov was arrested, in April he faced formal suspicion in connection with the loss of An-225 Mriya and damages to Antonov amounting to ₴8.4 million.

An An-124 that had been undergoing modernization at Hostomel Airport during the initial Russian invasion was flown out in July 2025.

== Composition ==
- Antonov Serial Production Plant (formerly Kyiv Aviation Factory "Aviant") – Kyiv
- Kharkiv Aviation Factory – Kharkiv
- Civil Aviation Factory 441 – Kyiv

=== Airfields ===
- Sviatoshyn Airfield, Aviant factory in Kyiv
- Hostomel Airport, freight airport in Hostomel

== Products and activities ==
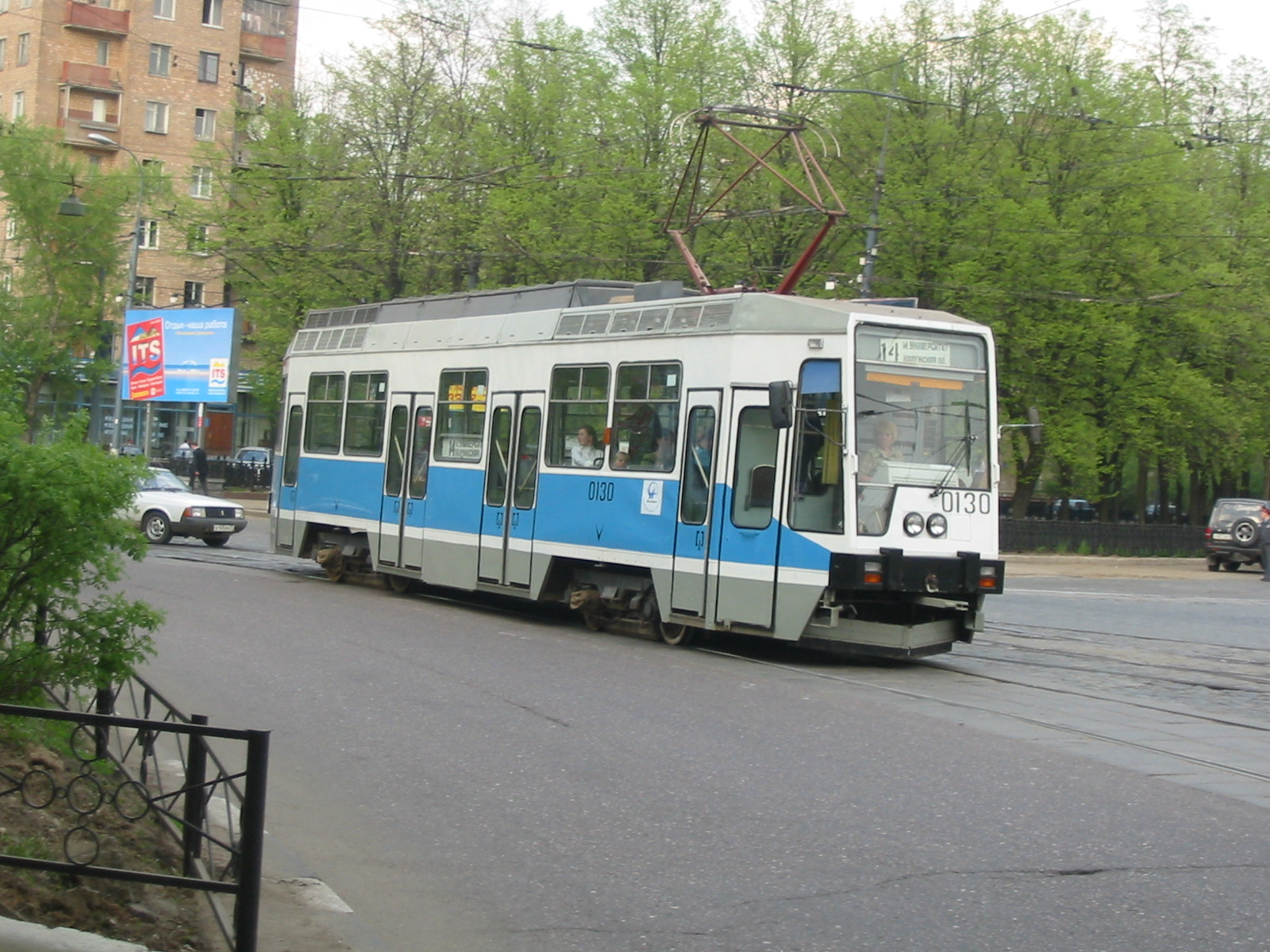
LT-10 tram

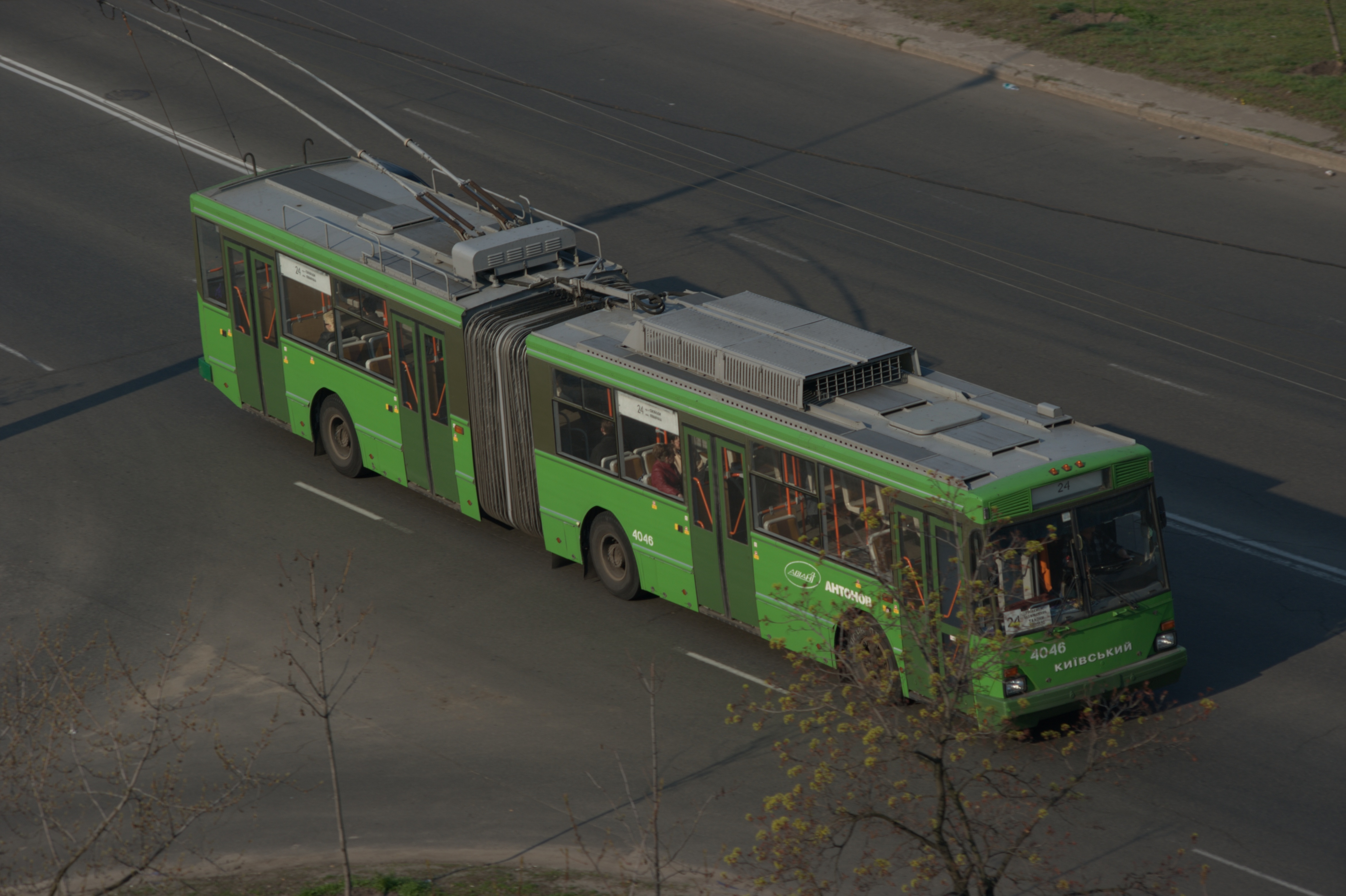
Kyiv-12 trolley bus

Fields of commercial activity of Antonov ASTC include:

- Aircraft design and manufacturing
- Cargo air transport (Antonov Airlines)
- Aircraft maintenance, testing, certification and upgrading
- Aerospace-related research and engineering
  - "Aerial Launch": a joint Russian-Ukrainian project of midair spacecraft space launch from aboard a modified version of the An-225.
- Operation of the Hostomel airport (Antonov Airport)
- Light metro RADAN
- Construction of LT-10A trams (with aluminium body)
- Construction and manufacturing of Kyiv-12 trolley buses (a spin-off, using existing technical expertise).

== Major contractors and partners ==
=== Contract and licensee manufacturers ===
- Tashkent Aviation Production Association (formerly Tashkent State Aviation Plant) – Tashkent, Uzbekistan
- Iran Aircraft Manufacturing Industrial Company (HESA) – Shahin Shahr, Iran
- Voronezh Aircraft Production Association (VASO) – Voronezh, Russia

== Chief designers ==
- Oleg Antonov: 1946–1984
- Petro Balabuiev: 1984–2005
- Dmytro Kiva: 2005–2016

== Aircraft ==
Antonov's primary activity has generally been developing large military transport aircraft, including the world's largest airplanes. It has also produced airliners. It has produced numerous variants of both transports and airliners, for operations ranging from air freight hauling to military reconnaissance, command and control operations. It has also developed various general aviation light aircraft, having originated as a producer of gliders.

=== Transports, airliners and derivatives ===
Antonov's aeroplanes (design office prefix An) range from the rugged An-2 biplane through the An-28 reconnaissance aircraft to the massive An-124 Ruslan and An-225 Mriya strategic airlifters (the latter being the world's heaviest aircraft and was the only one in service).

The An-24, An-26, An-30 and An-32 family of twin turboprop, high-winged, passenger-cargo-troop transport aircraft are important for domestic/short-haul air services particularly in parts of the world once led by communist governments. The An-72/An-74 series of small jetliners is slowly replacing that fleet, and a larger An-70 freighter is under certification.

The Antonov An-148 is a new regional airliner of twin-turbofan configuration. Over 150 aircraft have been ordered since 2007. A stretched version is in development, the An-158 (from 60–70 to 90–100 passengers).

Aircraft	Name	Maiden flight	Remarks
'K'		–	high-altitude weather reconnaissance aircraft based on An-2; precursor of An-6
'U'	Universal'nyy	–	turboprop airliner; precursor of An-10
'VT-22'		–	large turboprop transport, precursor of An-22
An-2	Kukuruznik	1947	multi-purpose, biplane, single-engine utility transport
An-3 (I)		1947	Redesigned An-2A to intercept US reconnaissance balloons overflying the USSR. Unlike the An-2A, the An-3 was a high-wing monoplane.
An-3 (III)		1980	turboprop conversion of An-2
An-4		1951	float-equipped An-2
An-6	Meteo	1948	high-altitude weather reconnaissance aircraft based on An-2
An-8		1956	medium military transport
An-10	Ukraina	1957	medium turboprop-powered airliner
An-11		1959	turbojet-powered version of A-11 glider
An-12		1957	military turboprop-powered transport, developed from An-10
An-13		1962	turbojet-powered version of A-13 glider
An-14	Pchelka	1958	light twin-engine transport
An-22	Antei	1965	extremely large turboprop transport
An-24		1959	twin-turboprop airliner
An-26	Nastia	1969	twin-turboprop transport, derived from An-24
An-28		1974	twin-turboprop light transport, developed from An-14
An-30	Nastia	1967	An-24 adapted for aerial photography and mapping
An-32		1976	twin-turboprop hot-and-high transport, up-engine An-26 airframe
An-34		1961	initial designation of An-24T
An-38		1994	twin-turboprop light transport, stretched An-28
An-70		1994	large military transport, powered by four propfan engines, to replace An-12
An-71		1985	prototype naval AWACS development of An-72
An-72	Cheburashka	1977	STOL transport, using the Coandă effect
An-74	Cheburashka	1983	civil version of An-72; version with engines below wings is called An-74TK-300
An-77		–	proposed modernized version of An-70 with Western avionics and engines
An-124	Ruslan	1982	strategic airlifter; largest aircraft ever mass-produced
An-140		1997	short-range turboprop airliner, to replace An-24
An-148		2004	regional jet for 68–85 passengers
An-158		2010	stretched version of An-148 for 99 passengers
An-168		2010	business variant of An-148; now called An-148-300
An-170		–	proposed enlarged version of An-70
An-171		–	proposed maritime patrol version of An-170
An-178		2015	medium military transport based on the An-158
An-188		–	proposed medium military transport based on An-70; basically a Westernized An-70 with turbojet engines
An-196	Liutyi	2022	UAV
An-225	Mriya	1988	An-124 derived strategic airlifter. The largest aircraft ever built; only one put into service. Destroyed in the Battle of Antonov Airport in February 2022.
An-714		1970	modification of An-14 with air cushion landing gear
An-BK-1	Horlytsya	2017	planned multipurpose UAV
T-2M	Maverick	1990	ultralight trike for recreational club use and special forces requirements

=== Cancelled/prototypes ===
Aircraft	Name	Status	Remarks
'400'		Cancelled	projected military transport/cargo freighter (1980)
'404 transport'		Cancelled	projected cargo freighter (1975)
'404P'		Cancelled	projected airliner (1975)
'500'		Cancelled	projected military transport/cargo freighter (1980)
'600'		Cancelled	projected military transport/cargo freighter (1980)
'700'		Cancelled	projected military transport/cargo freighter (1980)
'AE'		Cancelled	proposed liaison aircraft (1954)
'B'		Cancelled	experimental air trailer (tow glider); also known as VP
'E'		Cancelled	projected sport aircraft (1954)
E-153		Cancelled	flying testbed for aircraft 'M'
'M'	Masha	Cancelled	projected jet fighter (1947)
'N'		Cancelled	1953 projected twin turboprop airliner based on the An-8; cancelled in favor of the An-10
'P'		Cancelled	projected twin jet engine transport based on the An-8
'R'		Cancelled	projected twin-engine double deck transport (1948)
'SKV'	Partizanskii	Cancelled	projected STOL military transport (1948)
'Yu'		Cancelled	projected large double-deck turboprop transport
A-6		Cancelled	projected training/sports aircraft version of 'AE'
An-3 (II)		Cancelled	In an effort to replace the An-2SKh and following the failure of the WSK-Mielec M-15, a turboprop version was proposed with a new fuselage featuring a hunchback for the cockpit and an An-2M tail. Cancelled as too ambitious.
An-16		Cancelled	projected stretched variant of An-10
An-18		Cancelled	military transport (1950s)
An-20		Cancelled	projected large turboprop transport; cancelled in favor of VT-22
An-20		Cancelled	trainer; competitor to the Yak-30 and L-29
An-25		Cancelled	anti-balloon aircraft
An-26		Cancelled	projected airliner (1957)
An-30		Cancelled	development of An-14A
An-32		Cancelled	projected VTOL military transport (1968)
An-36		Cancelled	projected VTOL military transport (1972)
An-38		Cancelled	projected VTOL military transport (1972)
An-40		Cancelled	military transport developed from An-12
An-42		Cancelled	version of An-40 with boundary layer control
An-44		Cancelled	cargo aircraft project developed from An-24
An-46		Cancelled	projected military transport (1972)
An-49		Cancelled	projected aircraft for transporting orbital spacecraft (1982)
An-50		Cancelled	1972 jetliner project, developed from An-24V
An-51		Cancelled	civil piston utility aircraft
An-52		Cancelled	light twin-piston aircraft
An-60		Cancelled	projected STOL military transport, using the Coandă effect (1968); later became the An-72/An-74
An-64		Cancelled	projected military transport (1960s)
An-75		Cancelled	proposed carrier-based derivative of An-71 (1983)
An-80		Cancelled	projected airliner version of An-72/An-74 (1978)
An-89		Cancelled	projected reconnaissance aircraft (1989)
An-90		Cancelled	projected airliner (1978)
An-91		Cancelled	twin-engine cabin monoplane development of Cessna 310
An-102		Cancelled	light agricultural aircraft project (1990)
An-104		Cancelled	light agricultural aircraft project (1992)
An-112		Cancelled	projected military transport (1971)
An-112KC		Cancelled	2010 projected refueling tanker, co-developed with US Aerospace and based on the An-70. A competitor in the KC-X program, it was cancelled for being submitted too late, despite protests from US Aerospace.
An-122		Cancelled	Proposed 1966 development of An-22 with turbojet engines, a T-tail and swept wings. Developed as a response to the C-5 Galaxy, but cancelled in 1967 as it had no advantage over the An-22 and was inferior to the C-5.
An-122		Cancelled	projected military transport (1988)
An-125		Cancelled	heavy transport aircraft project (1970)
An-126		Cancelled	heavy transport aircraft project (1968)
An-126P		Cancelled	projected airliner (1968)
An-128		Cancelled	projected 2003 light passenger transport based on the An-28 and An-38
An-132		Cancelled	projected airliner (1963)
An-132		Cancelled	projected airliner (1974)
An-132		Cancelled	light transport aircraft based on An-32; cancelled in 2019
An-134		Cancelled	projected smaller version of An-124 without upper deck
An-142		Cancelled	projected AWACS aircraft based on An-124
An-142		Cancelled	projected cargo freighter version of An-140 (2001)
An-144		Cancelled	projected AWACS aircraft based on An-170 (1980s)
An-172		Cancelled	projected anti-submarine aircraft (1980s)
An-174		Cancelled	enlarged An-74 with engines below wings (2001)
An-180		Cancelled	projected medium propfan airliner, around 175 passengers (1989)
An-181	Handiwork	Cancelled	experimental aircraft
An-218		Cancelled	projected propfan- or turbofan-powered widebody airliner (1991)
An-222		Cancelled	projected military transport (1988)
An-224		Cancelled	Original proposal of An-225 with rear cargo door
An-248		Cancelled	projected airliner version of An-225, to compete with the Airbus A380
An-274		Cancelled	projected cargo freighter (1985)
An-300		Cancelled	projected airliner (1975)
An-318		Cancelled	1991 trijet project to compete with the DC-10 and L-1011 TriStar
An-325		Cancelled	planned enlarged, eight-engine version of An-225, intended for launching spacecraft (1988)
An-418		Cancelled	1989 projected airliner version of the An-124 to compete with the Airbus A380
An-Be-20		Cancelled	1964 small trijet airliner project to replace the Li-2, Il-12 and Il-14, developed in cooperation with Beriev. Cancelled in favor of the Yakovlev Yak-40, which was also in development at the time.
An-BSP		Cancelled	projected VTOL infantry combat aircraft (1972)
An-M		Cancelled	projected agricultural aircraft (1989)
An-M1		Cancelled	projected agricultural aircraft (1989)
DT-5/8		Cancelled	projected large twin-engine transport (1951)
GPS		Cancelled	small twin-engine utility transport
Pchela		Cancelled	projected STOL cargo/passenger aircraft (1955); precursor of An-14
Salamandra		Cancelled	projected fighter (1947); inspired by the He 162
STTS-500		Cancelled	projected cargo freighter (1984)
STVTS-500		Cancelled	projected military transport (1984)

=== Gliders ===
Aircraft	Name	Maiden flight	Remarks
A-1		1930	single-seat training glider
A-2		1942	two-seat training glider derived from the US-6
A-3	Molodv	1955	
A-7		1941	military glider
A-9		1948	single-seat sailplane developed from the RF-7
A-10		1952	two-seat sailplane developed from the A-9
A-11		1958	record glider
A-13		1958	aerobatic glider based on the A-11
A-15		1960	record glider
A-17		Cancelled	proposed 1972 rocket glider
A-40	Krylya Tanka [Winged Tank]	1942	flying tank
BA-1		1935	experimental glider
BS-3		1934	training glider based on the PS-2
BS-4		1935	towed training glider based on the BS-3
BS-5 (OKA-31)		1936	towed training glider based on the BS-4 and US-4
IP		1933	experimental glider
LEM-2 (OKA-33)		1937	motor glider
OKA-1	Golub [Dove]	1924	single-seat glider
OKA-2		1925	light single-seat glider based on OKA-1
OKA-3		1928	
OKA-4	Standart-1	1928	experimental glider
OKA-5	Standart-2	1928	improved OKA-4
OKA-6	Gorod Lenina [City of Lenin]	1930	record glider; led to the OKA-13 and OKA-14
OKA-7	Bubik [Bun]	1930	training glider
OKA-13	Shest uslovii Stalina [Stalin's Six Conditions]	1932	experimental glider based on OKA-14
OKA-14	Dognat i peregna [Catch Up and Overtake]	1932	record glider developed from the OKA-6
OKA-21		1933	training glider based on DiP
RE (OKA-22, OKA-24, OKA-29, OKA-30, OKA-31)		1933	experimental glider
RF-1 (OKA-17)	Rot Front-1	1933	
RF-2 (OKA-18)	Rot Front-2	1933	
RF-3 (OKA-19)	Rot Front-3	1933	
RF-4 (OKA-20)	Rot Front-4	1933	
RF-5 (OKA-23)	Rot Front-5	1934	
RF-6 (OKA-28)	Rot Front-6	1935	
RF-7	Rot Front-7	1937	record glider
RF-8	Rot Front-8	1941	troop glider, enlarged RF-7; redesignated A-7
UPAR (OKA-11, OKA-12)		1932	training sailplane
US-1 (OKA-8)		1931	prototype training glider
US-2 (OKA-9)		1931	training glider
US-3		1933	training glider, first mass-produced Soviet glider
US-4			training glider, redesignated A-1
US-5 (OKA-32)		1936	training glider; two-seat version of US-4
US-6			training glider; prototype for A-2

== See also ==
- List of military aircraft of the Soviet Union and the CIS
