= Antonov An-218 =

Proposed airliner by Antonov

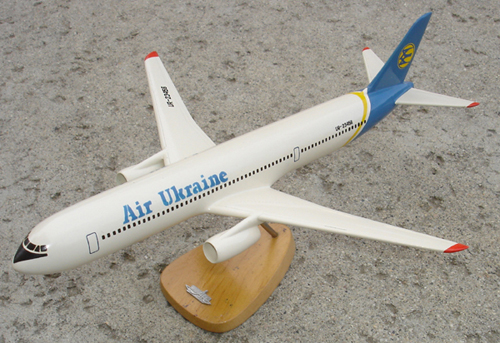

General information
- Type: Widebody airliner
- Manufacturer: Antonov
- Status: Project abandoned
- Number built: 0

The Antonov An-218 was a proposal by the Antonov Design Bureau for a widebody commercial airliner. A twin-engined design, it was intended to carry approximately 350 passengers.

The first flight was initially scheduled for 1994. Due to severe economic conditions the project was abandoned. Only a full-scale wooden replica of the An-218 was built, but eventually it was disassembled.

== History ==
After achieving independence, Ukraine organised a programme calling for the development of commuter and regional turboprop aircraft. (Note: This included the Antonov An-38, the Antonov An-140, the Antonov An-218, and the Antonov An-180.) Nicknamed the "Ukrainian Airbus",, the Antonov An-218 was designed to challenge the Airbus A330. Despite their similarities, the An-218 was slightly smaller and lighter and would carry less fuel than the A330.

Development first began in 1991, and it was first announced at the 1991 Paris Air Show. The aircraft was heavily advertised both domestically and internationally; a full-scale replica of the fuselage was constructed for photo ops with models and politicians. The aircraft was initially slated to fly in 1994, but "economic changes in the Soviet Union could alter the initial plans". In 1993, as production was about to commence, the project was frozen. By March 1994, the An-218 only existed as a "full-size wooden mock-up, with a false control panel and paper views of pine forests in place of inflight television screens." By 1995, the aircraft's first flight was scheduled for 1996, although its development had been deferred. The following year, it was reported that the aircraft had reportedly been discontinued the year prior, with production having been expected to begin as early as 1997.

Funding for the country's project was lacking, with projects only receiving 10% of the required amount. In addition, the projects had failed to attract commercial investors; the An-218 and An-180 were subsequently abandoned. The aircraft's mockup was reportedly dismantled in 2007 after staying in one of Antonov's hangars.

== Specifications (An-218-100, as designed) ==
Data from Janes All The World’s Aircraft 1995-96, Brassey's World Aircraft & Systems Directory 1996/97

General characteristics

- Crew: 2
- Capacity: 292 (mixed class layout) or 350 (single class layout) passengers; 42,000 kg (92,600 lb)
- Length: 59.79 m (196 ft 2 in)
- Wingspan: 50.00 m (164 ft 1 in)
- Height: 15.70 m (51 ft 6 in)
- Powerplant: 2 × Progress D-18T1 high bypass turbofan, 250 kN (57,000 lbf) thrust each

Performance

- Maximum speed: 870 km/h (540 mph, 470 kn)
- Range: 7,200–8,500 km (4,500–5,300 mi, 3,900–4,600 nmi) for 292 passengers; 6,300–7,500 km (3,900–4,700 mi; 3,400–4,000 nmi) for 350 passengers

== See also ==
Aircraft of comparable role, configuration, and era

- Airbus A330
- Boeing 767
- Ilyushin Il-96
- Tupolev Tu-304
