= Antonov A-11 =

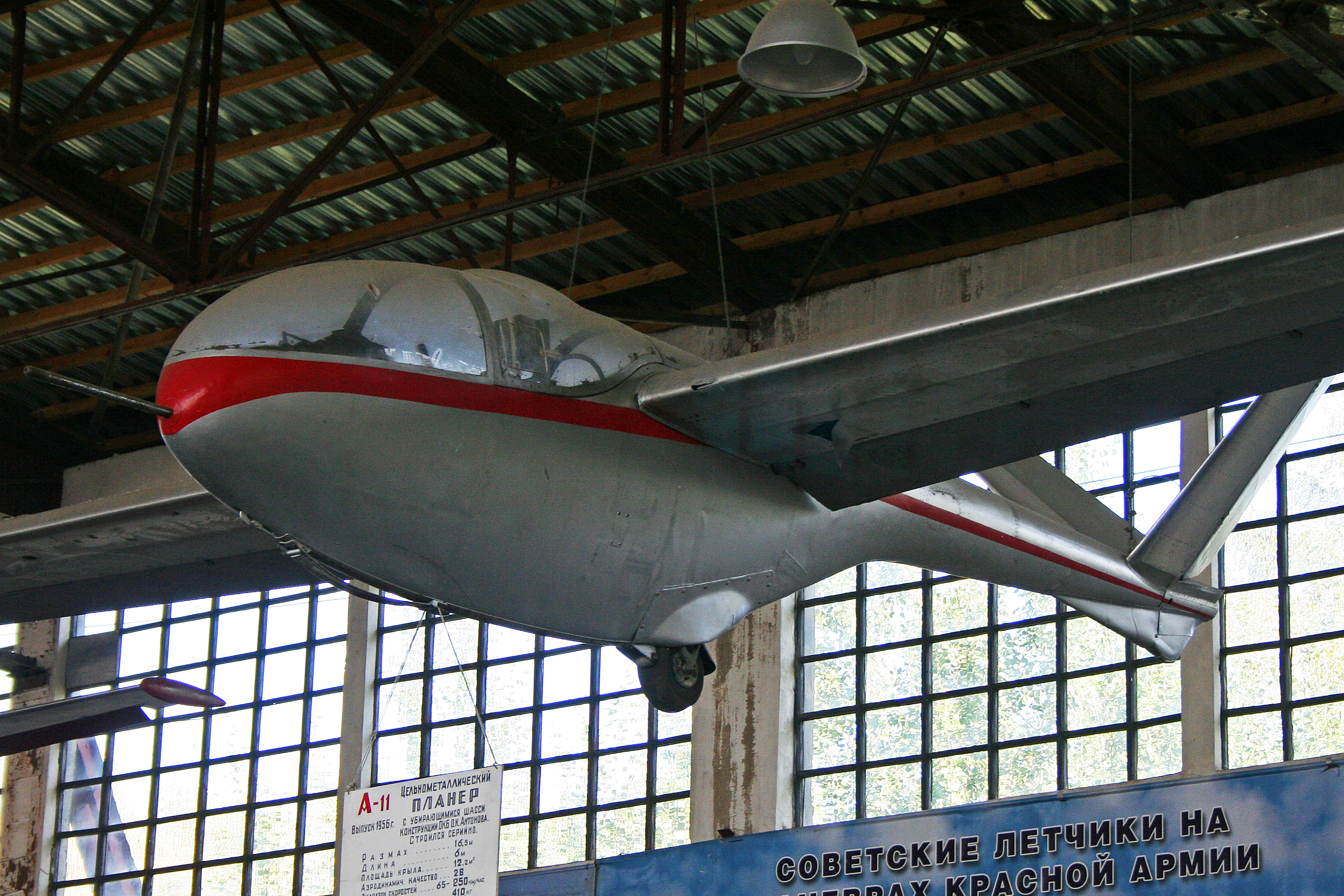
- An unmarked A-11 on display at the Central Air Force Museum, Monino

General information
- Type: High performance single seat glider
- National origin: Soviet Union
- Manufacturer: Antonov
- Designer: Oleg Antonov, Konstantinovitch
- Number built: 150

History
- First flight: 12 May 1958

The Antonov A-11 is a single-seat, high performance, all-metal sailplane built in the Soviet Union in the late 1950s. 150 were produced.

== Design and development ==
The almost all-metal A-11 was Antonov's first non-wood framed sailplane. It is a cantilever mid-wing monoplane, with straight tapered wings mostly swept on the trailing edge and set with 1.5° of dihedral but no washout. A single spar with a metal-skinned leading edge forward of it and fabric covering aft forms most of the span but the curved tips are supported by twin spars. The fabric-covered ailerons are slotted, with set-back hinges and mass balances. They can be drooped together through 8° to act as flaps. Inboard, there are slotted flaps on the trailing edges and spoilers, mounted at mid-chord and quite close to the fuselage, of the gapless kind opening upwards only.

The fuselage of the A-11 is a metal monocoque of pod and boom form, with a gradual transition between the two. It carries an all-metal, straight edged 90° V- or butterfly tail, its control surfaces mass-balanced with external weights. The three-piece canopy stretches smoothly from the nose to above mid-chord without a stepped windscreen. There is a retractable monowheel undercarriage, sprung but without brakes, assisted by a rubber-mounted skid forward of the wheel and a tail bumper aft, formed by a short, shallow ventral fin

The A-11 first flew on 12 May 1958. It was approved for aerobatics, spins and cloud flying.

== Aircraft on display ==
Information from Ogden

- Central Russian Air Force Museum, Monino
- Panevėžys Airfield Monument

== Specifications (Antonov A-11) ==
Data from The World's Sailplanes:Die Segelflugzeuge der Welt:Les Planeurs du Monde Volume II

General characteristics

- Crew: one
- Length: 6 m (19 ft 8 in)
- Wingspan: 16.5 m (54 ft 2 in)
- Height: 1.2 m (3 ft 11 in) at cockpit
- Wing area: 12.15 m^{2} (130.8 sq ft)
- Aspect ratio: 22.4
- Airfoil: TsAGI R 111 A (Note: Most sources refer to P III; Simons refers to R III for the airfoil of the A-9 glider. The difference is generated by transliteration between Cyrillic script and Roman where p in Cyrillic is R in Roman script.)
- Empty weight: 294 kg (648 lb)
- Gross weight: 400 kg (882 lb)

Performance

- Stall speed: 60 km/h (37 mph, 32 kn)
- Never exceed speed: 350 km/h (220 mph, 190 kn)
- Aerotow speed: 200 km/h (124.3 mph; 108.0 kn)
- Winch launch speed: 120 km/h (74.6 mph; 64.8 kn)
- g limits: +8.66 -3.9 at 300 km/h (186.4 mph; 162.0 kn)
- Maximum glide ratio: 32 at 97 km/h (60.3 mph; 52.4 kn)
- Rate of sink: 0.74 m/s (146 ft/min) at 86 km/h (53.4 mph; 46.4 kn)
- Wing loading: 33 kg/m^{2} (6.8 lb/sq ft)

== See also ==
Related development

- Antonov A-9
- Antonov A-13
- Antonov A-15

Related lists List of gliders

== Bibliography ==
- Ogden, Bob (2011). Aviation Museums and Collections of North America (2 ed.). Tonbridge, Kent: Air-Britain (Historians). pp. 357, 464. ISBN 978-0-85130-385-7.
- Shenstone, B.S.; K.G. Wilkinson (1963). The World's Sailplanes:Die Segelflugzeuge der Welt:Les Planeurs du Monde Volume II (in English, French, and German) (1st ed.). Zurich: Organisation Scientifique et Technique Internationale du Vol a Voile (OSTIV) and Schweizer Aero-Revue. pp. 242–243.
- Simons, Martin (2006). Sailplanes 1945–1965 (2nd revised ed.). Königswinter: EQIP Werbung & Verlag GmbH. p. 135. ISBN 3-9807977-4-0.
- Taylor, John W R (1962). Jane's All the World's Aircraft 1962–63. London: Sampson Low, Marston & Co. Ltd. p. 342.
