= Antonov An-325 =

Air-launch-to-orbit aircraft by the Soviets

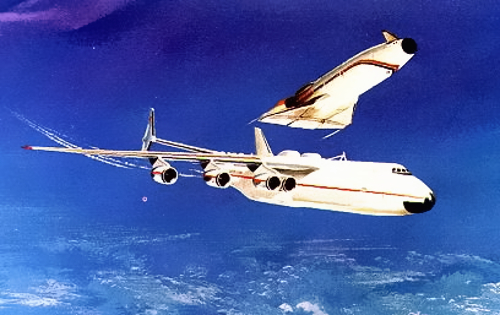
- An illustration of an Antonov An-325 launching a British HOTOL Spacecraft.

General information
- Type: Outsize cargo freight aircraft
- National origin: Soviet Union
- Designer: Antonov
- Built by: Antonov Serial Production Plant
- Status: Cancelled
- Primary user: Soviet Union

History
- Developed from: Antonov An-225 Mriya

The Antonov An-325 (Ukrainian: Антонов Ан-325) was a proposed evolution of the Antonov An-225 "Mriya", designed to launch spacecraft of various purposes into circular, elliptical and high-circle orbits, including geostationary orbit. It was planned to be an enlarged and improved version of the An-225 but it was never built.

== History ==
=== Development ===
In the 1980s, the Soviet Union pursued a Multipurpose aerospace system (MAKS) project. Its essence was to use the An-325 carrier aircraft (based on the "Mriya") to launch an orbital plane. According to the project, at an altitude of ten thousand metres the carrier was to make a "slide" with separation from the aircraft "shuttle" at the time of descent. After separation, the orbital plane was to go into orbit on its own engines, and the An-325 was to leave for landing. Advantages of MAKS were considered: absence of tie-ups with the spaceport, possibility of rescuing crews on space objects, and high-altitude reconnaissance.

The idea of launching spacecraft by air launch has existed for a long time. Since the An-124 Ruslan aircraft was created, there has been an idea of creating a system to launch a space rocket at an altitude of 8-11 kilometres and put its payload into orbit. Similar concepts have emerged in Europe and North America. While the USSR was working on creation of MAKS, other countries were working on their own airborne rockets. One was by the United Kingdom, developing HOTOL in the same timeframe. With the appearance of the An-225 in the USSR and its design for the air-launch of such products, the idea of combining the projects arose.

=== British involvement ===
In July 1990, British Aerospace and the Soviet Ministry of Aviation Industry agreed to study the feasibility of air-launching an interim version of HOTOL from the back of the Soviet Union's Antonov An-225 heavy-lift transport aircraft. The 6-month Joint Study Program was carried out concurrently in the Soviet Union and the United Kingdom, with data and analyses shared between the two organizations, leading to the design of the An-325.

In June 1991, the An-225 and the 250-ton reusable Interim HOTOL spacecraft developed by British Aerospace were presented as part of a joint international aerospace system for near-Earth space exploration programme at the European Space Agency's headquarters in Paris. When compared to vertical launch, the implementation of this project promised a fourfold decrease in the cost of orbital payload placement. HOTOL addressed the issue of getting crews to orbital stations and removing them from there in an emergency more efficiently.

However, due to the complexity and technological limitations at the time, it did not ensure the implementation of such a project in a single stage. Neither the UK government at the time nor the ESA, which was busy with its own projects, Hermes and Ariane 5, agreed to finance these works. Eventually funding ceased, development stopped, and the project was frozen for more than 20 years. This was then exacerbated due to economic issues and the dissolution of the Soviet Union, leading to its cancellation. Only in 2012 did the project receive interest, and at the moment it is still under discussion for private aviation.

== Project ==
The An-325 was to have two additional engines, which were to be mounted on the respective inner engine mounts in a manner comparable to the U.S. Boeing B-47. This would have resulted in an eight-engine aircraft with six engines nacelles. The An-325 was designed on the basis of the An-225, with a difference of increasing the dimensions and adding an additional compartment for aviation fuel. Since the weight of fuel that the plane could carry, exceeded the volume of space that the plane could hold, the An-325 was equipped with a rocket on the fuselage mounts to transport the external tank.

In the case of Interim HOTOL, it would be carried by the An-325 during an approximately hour-long flight to an altitude of 9 km and the proper release point would be reached after liquid hydrogen/liquid oxygen was supplied to the Orbiter on the ground. From an altitude of roughly 9.4 km, the An-325 would begin a shallow dive, briefly increasing its degree at about 15 seconds to release the Orbiter, and then continuing the dive to avoid the engine exhaust plume. The Interim HOTOL's vehicle's four engines would start in pairs just before and just after release, and the ignition sequence would be finished 4 to 6 seconds later. Once separation is complete the An-325 would successfully return to the ground. The plane, which never got beyond the planning stage, was intended as a launch platform for Soviet and foreign spacecraft.

== See also ==
- Airborne aircraft carrier – Type of mother ship aircraft

Related development

- Antonov An-225 Mriya – Soviet/Ukrainian heavy strategic cargo aircraft

Aircraft of comparable role, configuration, and era

- Shuttle Carrier Aircraft – Modified Boeing 747 airliners used to transport Space Shuttle orbiters
- Conroy Virtus – Proposed American large transport aircraft intended to carry the Space Shuttle
- Myasishchev VM-T – Conversion of Soviet M-4 Molot bomber to carry outsized cargo
