= Oleksandr Donets =

Ukrainian businessman and engineer (born 1966)

- Born: February 4, 1966 (age 59); Kiev, Ukrainian SSR
- Education: Kiev Institute of Civil Aviation Engineers
- Occupation: Antonov engineer
- Spouse: Svitlana Naumovna
- Children: Anatoly Oleksandrovich, Tatyana Oleksandrivna
- Awards: Charter of the Ministry of Defense of Ukraine

Oleksandr Donets (Ukrainian: Олександр Дмитрович Донець (Oleksandr Dmytrovych Donets), born 4 February 1966) is the current head of Antonov State Company, a large Ukrainian aircraft manufacturing and services company.

== Biography ==
Donets was born on 4 February 1966, in Kyiv, Soviet Ukraine. In 1988, Donets graduated from the Kyiv Institute of Civil Aviation Engineers with a degree in the technical operation of aircraft. He began his career in the Antonov Design Bureau as an operating engineer. He was promoted to chief engineer of the flight test and development base.

From June 2007 to October 2008, Donets headed the work of Aviant. By 2014, he was the general director of Ukraine Air Enterprise. From September 2015 to November 2016, he worked as assistant director of the State Enterprise for the Air Traffic Services of Ukraine, Ukraerorukh. Beginning in December 2016, he served as the vice president for production of the Antonov State Enterprise. On May 30, 2018, he was appointed head of the Antonov State Enterprise by the order of Ukroboronprom.

On June 9, 2020, he was dismissed from the position of director of the State Enterprise "Antonov" by order of Aivaras Abromavichus. Oleksandr Donets filed a lawsuit demanding that the decision be declared unlawful. On June 15 2020, the Kyiv District Administrative Court suspended the dismissal of President Donets.

== Personal life ==
Married. Has a son and a daughter.
