= Antonov T-2M Maverick =

Ultralight trike by Antonov

General information
- Type: Ultralight trike
- National origin: Ukraine
- Manufacturer: Antonov

The Antonov T-2M Maverick is a Ukrainian ultralight trike, designed and produced by Antonov.

== Design and development ==
The T-2M was developed by the Antonov Design Bureau at the end of the Cold War when it became necessary to explore civil markets for aircraft, including microlights for club flying. Aside from production for recreational purposes, the T-2M was also designed for use by the Russian Special Forces for use on infiltration missions, and as such incorporated a sophisticated wing folding mechanism at their request.

The T-2M features a cable-braced hang glider-style high-wing, weight-shift controls, a two-seats-in-side-by-side configuration open cockpit, tricycle landing gear and a single engine in pusher configuration. The aircraft is made from tubing, with its wing covered in Dacron sailcloth. Its 163 sq ft (15.1 m^{2}) area wing is supported by a single tube-type kingpost and uses an "A" frame control bar. The standard engine supplied was the 64 hp (48 kW) Rotax 582 twin-cylinder, two-stroke, liquid-cooled powerplant. The smaller 50 hp (37 kW) Rotax 503 and the four-stroke 80 hp (60 kW) Rotax 912 were also supplied.

The T-2M introduced two features not found on western trikes. It has side-by-side seating, which offers advantages in flight training and also has a large single piece leaf spring main landing gear, which is simple, light, low drag and eliminates many of the large number of parts that other designs use. The aircraft can be operated on wheels, skis and floats. An agricultural aircraft aerial application package is also available.

The T-2M was sold in North America and a dealer, UK-Air, was based in Mississauga, Ontario, Canada. It sold for US$18,500 in 2000.

== Specifications (T-2M) ==
Data from Cliche

General characteristics

- Crew: one
- Capacity: one passenger
- Wing area: 15.1 m^{2} (163 sq ft)
- Empty weight: 170 kg (374 lb)
- Gross weight: 352 kg (775 lb)
- Fuel capacity: 26 litres (5.7 imp gal; 6.9 US gal)
- Powerplant: 1 × Rotax 582 twin cylinder, two-stroke, liquid-cooled aircraft engine, 48 kW (64 hp)

Performance

- Cruise speed: 89 km/h (55 mph, 48 kn)
- Stall speed: 45 km/h (28 mph, 24 kn)
- Rate of climb: 5.1 m/s (1,000 ft/min)
