= Petro Balabuyev =

Ukrainian aircraft designer

Hero of Ukraine Petro Balabuyev
- Петро Балабуєв
- Petro Balabuyev with the An-148 in the background
- Born: 23 March 1931; Valuisk, Ukrainian SSR, Soviet Union
- Died: May 17, 2007 (aged 76)
- Occupation: Antonov aircraft designer
- Awards: Hero of Ukraine (1999); Hero of Socialist Labor (1975); USSR State Prize (1973)

Signature
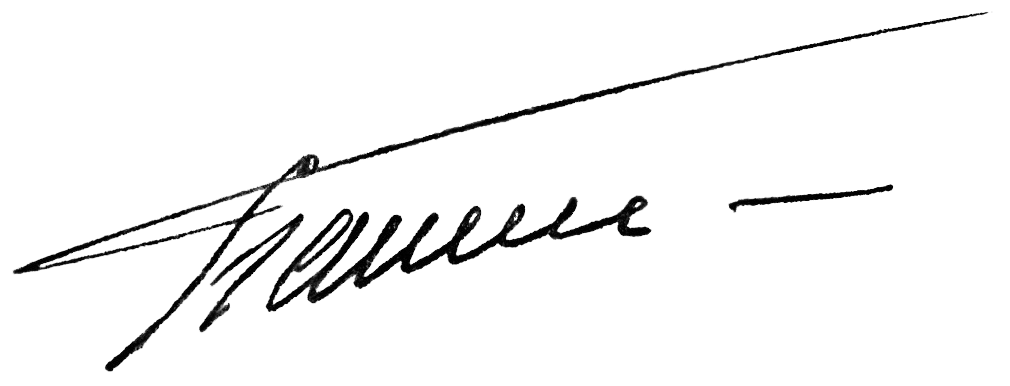

Petro Vasylovych Balabuyev (Ukrainian: Петро Васильович Балабуєв, 23 March 1931 – 17 May 2007) was a Ukrainian aircraft designer, engineer, Doctor of Engineering (1988), professor, chief designer of the Antonov Design Bureau (1984 – May 2005), Hero of Socialist Labour and a Hero of Ukraine, head of Kyiv-based Antonov Aircraft for 20 years.

== Biography ==
Petro Balabuyev was born on 23 May 1931, on a Valuisk farm in Luhansk Oblast. He graduated from the Kharkov Aviation Institute in 1954 with qualifications of an aircraft mechanical engineer. In April 1954, after graduating from Kharkiv Aviation Institute, he started working at the Kharkov aircraft company:

- at first as a structural engineer
- since 1956 - Head of the workshop
- since 1959 - Head of the assembly line
- since 1960 - lead designer, acting head of production dept.
- since 1961 - deputy chief engineer, main representative of Antonov Design Bureau at Tashkent Aviation Production Association
- since 1965 - Head of the Research Bureau of Antonov
- since 1968 - deputy chief designer
- since 1971 - chief designer, First Deputy General Designer
- since 1984 - chief designer of Antonov

=== Aircraft ===
Under his guidance the following aircraft were developed: Antonov An-22, Antonov An-72, An-74, Antonov An-32, Antonov An-28, Antonov An-124 (the world's second largest serially manufactured cargo aircraft), Antonov An-225 Mriya (eng. - Dream) (the largest operational aircraft in the world - destroyed after Russian attack). Among recent developments are the Antonov An-140 and Antonov An-148, Antonov An-38 and Antonov An-70.

Other positions taken by Petro Balabuyev:

- Chairman of the board of the International Consortium "Medium Transport Aircraft"
- Program manager for the implementation of the contract with the Islamic Republic of Iran
- Member of Exporter council at the Cabinet of Ministers of Ukraine (since February 1999)

Balabuyev was the author of over 100 scientific papers. He developed scientific bases of design and practical implementation of supercritical wing profiles into the design of heavy transport aircraft.

Petro Balabuyev died on May 17, 2007, in Kyiv.

== Awards and honours ==
=== Soviet and Russian ===
- Order of the Red Banner of Labour (1966)
- USSR State Prize (1973)
- Hero of Socialist Labour (awarded with Order of Lenin and the Gold Medal "Hammer and Sickle", 1975)
- Order of Friendship (1998)
