= Dmytro Kiva =

Ukrainian engineer and designer (1942–2024)

Hero of Ukraine Dmytro Kiva
- Дмитро Ківа
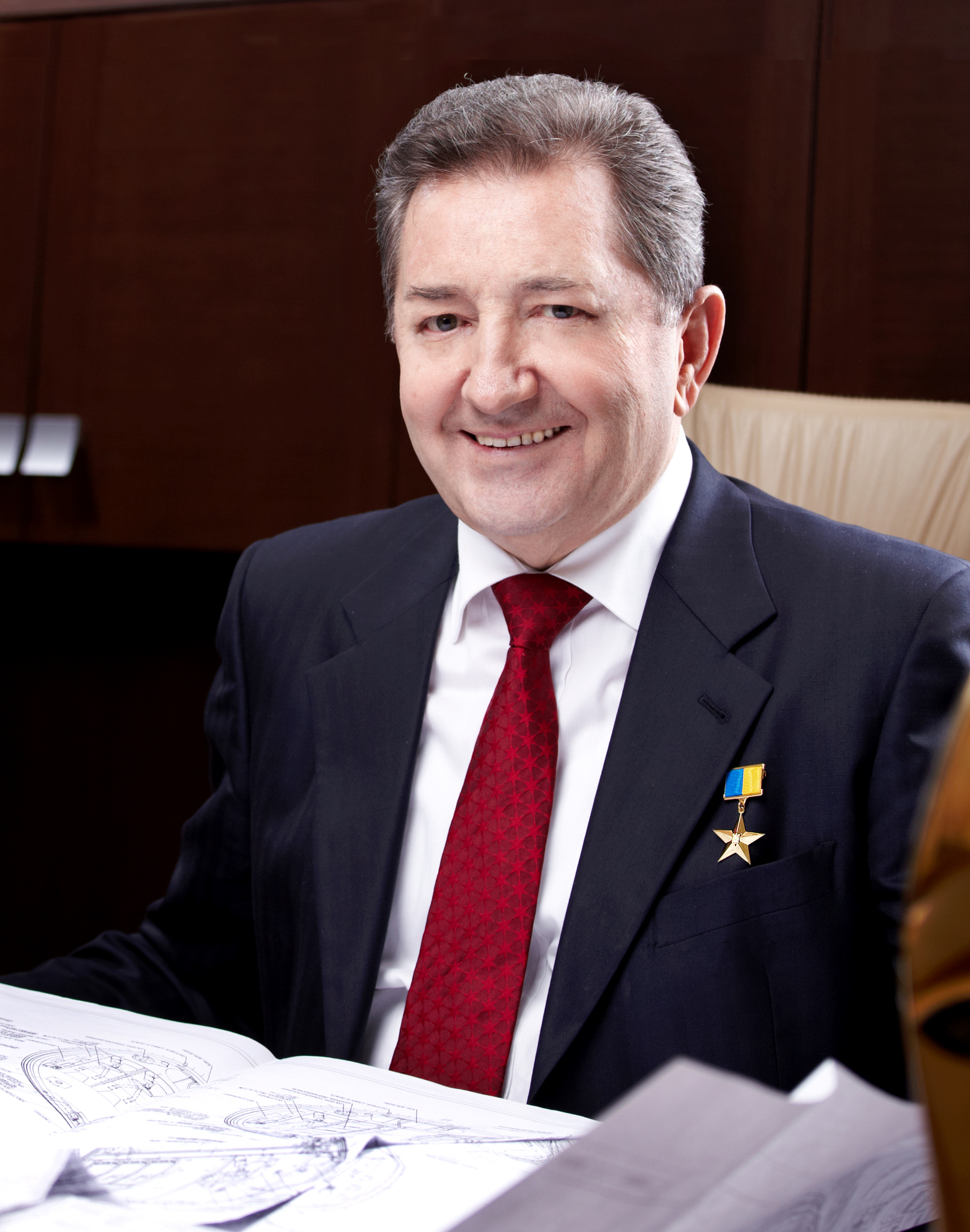
- Kiva in 2009
- Born: 8 October 1942; Kazan, Tatar ASSR, Russian SFSR, USSR
- Died: 24 July 2024 (aged 81)
- Education: Kharkiv Aviation Institute
- Occupations: Engineer; professor
- Organization: Former President–General designer at Antonov
- Awards: Hero of Ukraine

Dmytro Semenovich Kiva (Ukrainian: Дмитро Семенович Ківа; 8 October 1942 – 24 July 2024) was a Ukrainian engineer and academic who was a recipient of the Hero of Ukraine, Order of Merit and Order of Prince Yaroslav the Wise. Additionally, he was once the President–General designer at Antonov.

== Early life and education ==
Born on 8 October 1942, in the Tatarstan city of Kazan. Kiva graduated from the Kharkov Aviation Institute in 1965. He was employed at the Antonov Aviation Scientific-Technical Complex (ASTC) beginning in 1964. He joined the state-owned corporation in 2006 as its chief designer and rose to the position within two years.

== Career ==
Dmytro Kiva was named General Designer on 25 May 2005, by order of Volodymyr Shandra, Minister of Industrial Policy. Furthermore, he was the president and general designer of Antonov ASTC from 2006. As early as 2006, Antonov proposed to create fighter and attack aircraft. However, Kiva stated that at the time, they were arguing that it wasn't required. He went on to say that Ukrainian businesses would be involved in the creation of these aircraft, which would include Ukrainian engines, equipment, and armaments.

Under Dmytro Kiva's leadership, the Antonov Company grew and achieved high production activity indices despite challenging economic times. Honorable Company Collective has consistently represented Ukraine at the highest international forums, safeguarded its aviation potential in global markets, upheld high social standards, operated as an enterprise devoid of government subsidies, and is among the largest taxpayers in Ukraine. Notably, the Antonov An-70, An-148 and An-158, An-140, and An-178 have all been designed by Kiva.

On 18 June 2009, during the Paris Air Show, Dmytro Kiva and Bernard Charlès, President and CEO of Dassault Systèmes, inked a strategic alliance to expedite the adoption of the French company's most recent PLM products. According to him, Dassault Systèmes PLM systems have long since shown to be the greatest solution to the difficulties facing the aerospace sector. Kiva was negotiating potential cooperation with the Russian government in December 2013. Production of the An-148 and An-158 was discussed.

From 14 to 20 July 2014, in the vicinity of London, the Antonov Company showcased its contemporary programs at the Farnborough – 2014 exhibition. The delegation of Antonov, led by President and General Designer Dmytro Kiva, had many meetings and talks on the agenda, all aimed at fostering communication with European businesses and aircraft operators.

The government said in 2014 that Dmytro Kiva, the President–General designer of Antonov, will be removed. Workers for Antonov responded by marching into Kyiv and calling for his return. The company refuted rumors that he was relieved of his duties in a statement posted on the company's website on 14 August 2014. Workers also demanded that the company's leadership be led by Dmytro Kiva and that the Cabinet of Ministers of Ukraine's resolution No.18, dated 11 April 2014, be revoked. On 4 July, a group of honorary test pilots from Ukraine wrote an open letter to President Petro Poroshenko pleading with him to keep open the possibility of growing the aviation sector in their country and to reinstate Dmytro Kiva as chief designer.

In a June 2015 interview Antonov stated he wanted to begin working with Poland since they had a lot of experience in one area and the Poles in another. Mikailo Hvozdev took over as Antonov's CEO in June 2016, although Kiva was said to have remained the company's chief designer. Later that year, he relocated from Kyiv to Baku, the capital of Azerbaijan, to work on developing the country's aviation sector. He carefully considered his options and hoped to be able to carry out aviation initiatives that would benefit Azerbaijan.

== Death ==
Kiva died on 24 July 2024, at the age of 81.

== Awards and recognitions ==
Kiva received the title of Hero of Ukraine in 2009 in recognition of his exceptional contributions to the growth of the national aviation industry and the country's economic potential. Kiva received awards and recognitions such as:

- Hero of Ukraine Order of the State (12 July 2009)
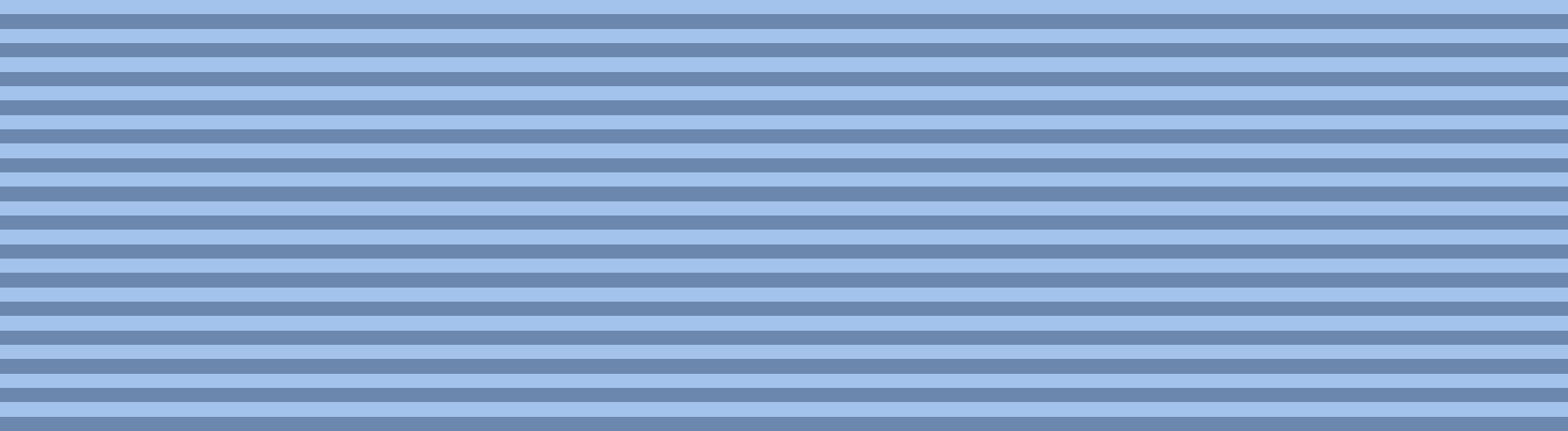
- Order of Prince Yaroslav the Wise Fifth Class (22 June 2009)
- Order of Merit First Class (24 September 2004)
- Order of Merit Second Class (24 September 2001)
- Order of Merit Third Class (26 January 2008)
- Oleh Kostiantynovych Antonov Prize of the National Academy of Sciences of Ukraine (2002)
- Honored Science and Technology Figure of Ukraine
- Honorary Citizen of Kyiv (2012)
