= Frigate Ecojet =

Russian wide-body airliner design

Frigate Freejet
- New quadjet design

General information
- Type: Wide-body civil aircraft
- National origin: Russian Federation
- Manufacturer: JSC "Russian Avia Consortium" Corp.

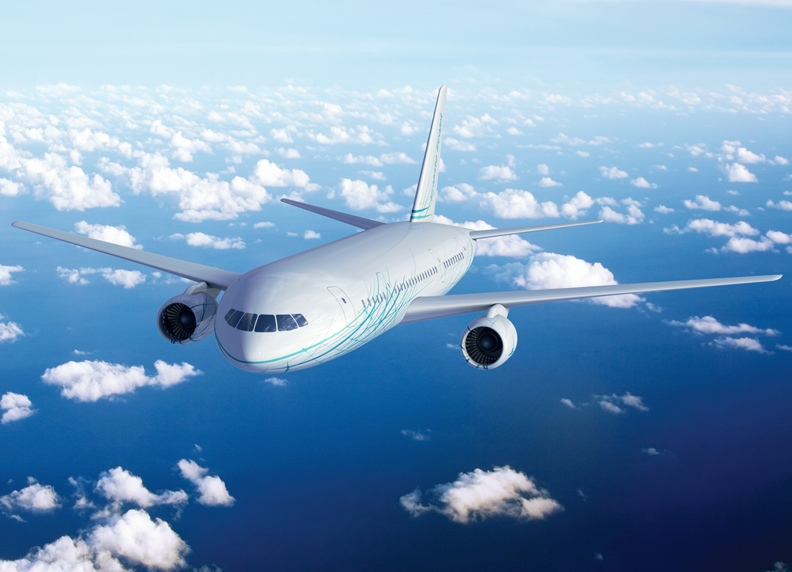
Previous twinjet design.\

The Frigate Ecojet (in Russian: Фрегат Экоджет, transliterated as Fregat Ekodzhet), is a program for the development of a new wide-body medium-haul civil aircraft using new aerodynamic, and design configurations. The project started in 1991 as the twinjet Tu-304 under the leadership of Valentin Klimov (then chief designer of the Tupolev design bureau), being initially projected to carry up to 500 passengers. Since 2004 the project has been carried out by a new design bureau, led by Valentin Klimov and instituted as a daughter company of Tupolev, headed by Valentin Klimov's son, Alexandr Klimov. Since 2017, the quadjet aircraft design has been branded the Frigate Freejet.

== Initial technical characteristics ==
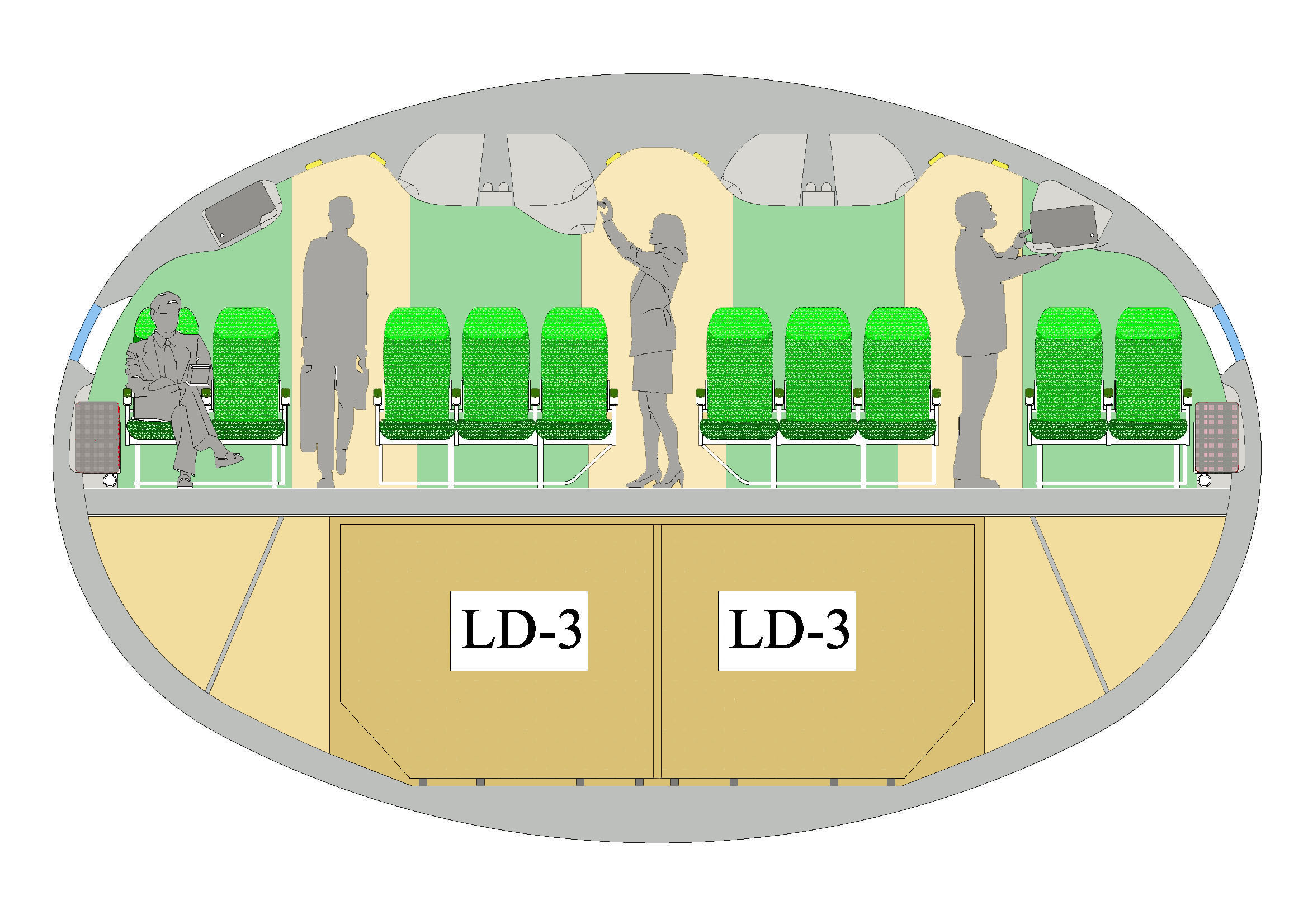
"Frigate Ecojet" fuselage cut-view

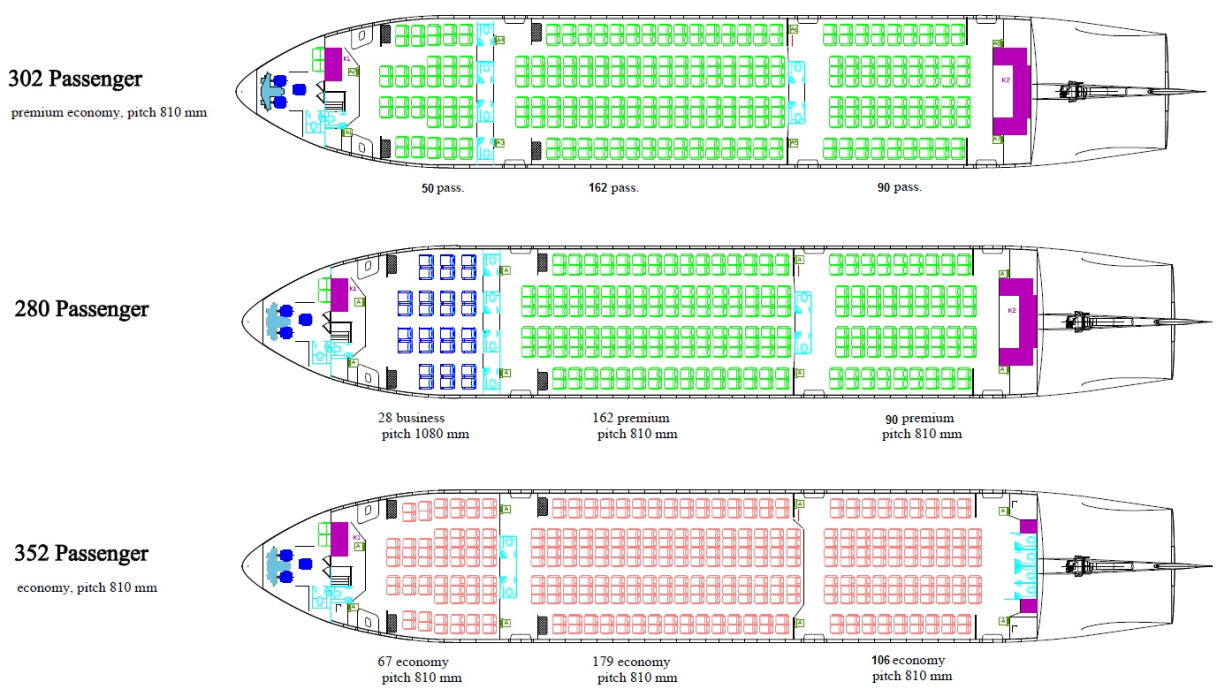
"Frigate Ecojet" cabin-view

The primary goal of the Frigate Ecojet program was the development of a range of new wide-body medium-haul aircraft, intended to be operational by 2018.

The new wide-body aircraft uses an oval fuselage configuration. The chosen form ensures minimal dimensions for the aircraft with 300–350 passengers in three cabins, three main aisles, no less than 500 mm (20 inches) wide and spaces between seats no less than 810 mm (32 inches). In an all-economy layout, the number of seats can be increased to 400. The aircraft can accommodate 302 passengers in a basic three-class layout (Business Class, Premium Economy and Economy).

In 2015 the company and project engineers were relocated from Moscow to an undisclosed non-EU European country in order to seek flight certification from EASA rather than Russia, since this offered savings due to the host country determining certification authority. Russian standards are lower and not yet harmonized with EASA/FAA and if it was based in Russia it would have to repeat at least 30% of qualifying flights for EASA to receive a European flight certification as well as meeting more stringent design standards. If the company were based in an EASA country it could receive EASA and FAA dual certification from a single test program. Sergey Grachev, director of marketing sales for the Frigate Ecojet stated that developing this kind of aircraft in Russia was not possible. The plan was to perform its first flight in 2018 or 2019 and enter into service in 2021. Following the move to Europe the company planned to harmonize cockpit design with a competitor to reduce pilot training costs.

In January 2016 the company announced that it had completed wind tunnel trials in Germany in partnership with ThyssenKrupp and that the first 15 (unofficially first 45) aircraft would be manufactured and certified in the EU, in Germany, Czech Republic or Slovakia. The performance specifications were also frozen at 352–400 passengers in all-economy seating, MTOW 123t, a range of 2340 km with a payload of 33.4t and 4500 km with 24.7t, a minimum runway length of 2375m and a speed of Mach 0.8.

== From Ecojet to Freejet ==
In August 2017, initially powered by 177–226 kN (40,000–51,000 lbf) PD-18R or PS-90A20 but lacking modern engines, the twinjet was modified into a Freejet four-engined design powered by modern 12–14 tf (26,000–31,000 lbf) engines introduced for the single-aisle market: the Irkut MC-21's Aviadvigatel PD-14, the Pratt & Whitney PW1100G or the CFM International LEAP powering the A320neo and the B737 MAX, losing a little in aerodynamics and weight and raising the maximum take-off weight from 130 to 140 t (290,000 to 310,000 lb) for a range of 3,500 km (1,900 nmi) for 300 passengers in an all-economy 10-abreast triple-aisle cabin, increasing to 4,680 km (2,530 nmi) with 244 passengers; it has a wingspan of 48.53 m (159.2 ft) and over length of 49.65 m (162.9 ft) with eight emergency exits.

The company said it was dissatisfied with the age of the current engines on the market in the desired power class with no new or updated models in development and lacking the funds and time (around 3–5 years of development) to sponsor development of its own.

== See also ==
- Aurora D8
- Middle of the market
- Narrowbody aircraft
- Airbus A320neo
- Boeing 737 MAX
- Comac C919
- Irkut MC-21
- Widebody aircraft
- Airbus A330
- Boeing 787
