= Sviatoshyn Airfield =

Sviatoshyn Airfield Аеродром Святошин
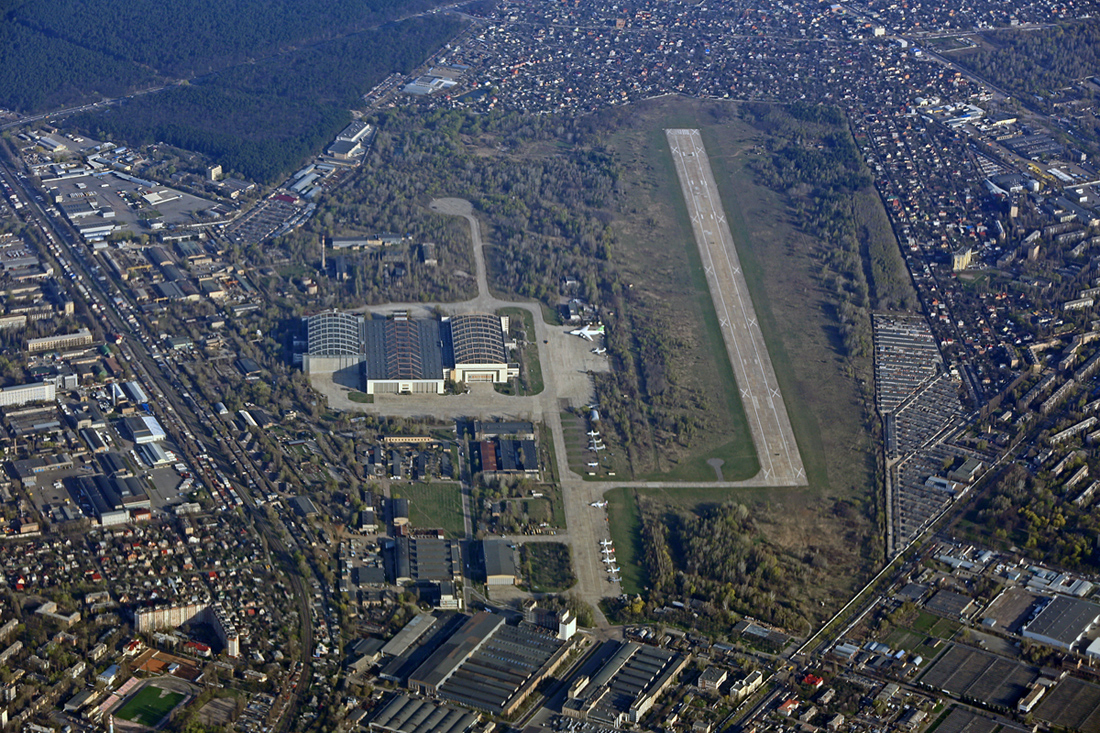
- Aerial view. to the left Sviatoshyn, to the right Nyvky, at the top Berkivtsi
- IATA: none; ICAO: UKKT

Summary
- Airport type: Industrial
- Owner: Antonov
- Location: Kyiv
- Elevation AMSL: 581 ft / 177 m
- Coordinates: 50°28′42″N 030°23′6″E
- Interactive map of Sviatoshyn Airfield

Runways
Direction	Length		Surface
Direction	ft	m	Surface
14/32	5,905	1,800	Concrete

Sviatoshyn Airfield (Ukrainian Аеродром «Святошин»), formerly known as Svyatoshino, is an industrial airfield in Kyiv, Ukraine, located 11 km northwest of city center. It is part of the Antonov Serial Production Plant, surrounded by the districts of Sviatoshyn, Nyvky, and Bilychi.

Sviatoshyn Airfield sometimes hosts Kyiv's aviation events such as shows or festivals, but otherwise remains inaccessible to the public. The city's main aviation museum is located near the Zhuliany Airport.

As of 14 March 14 2022, the airport began taking heavy bombardment from invading Russian forces trying to advance further to the Ukrainian capital during the Battle of Kyiv, receiving severe damage.

== See also ==
- Aviant
