= Antonov Serial Production Plant =

Ukraine aircraft company

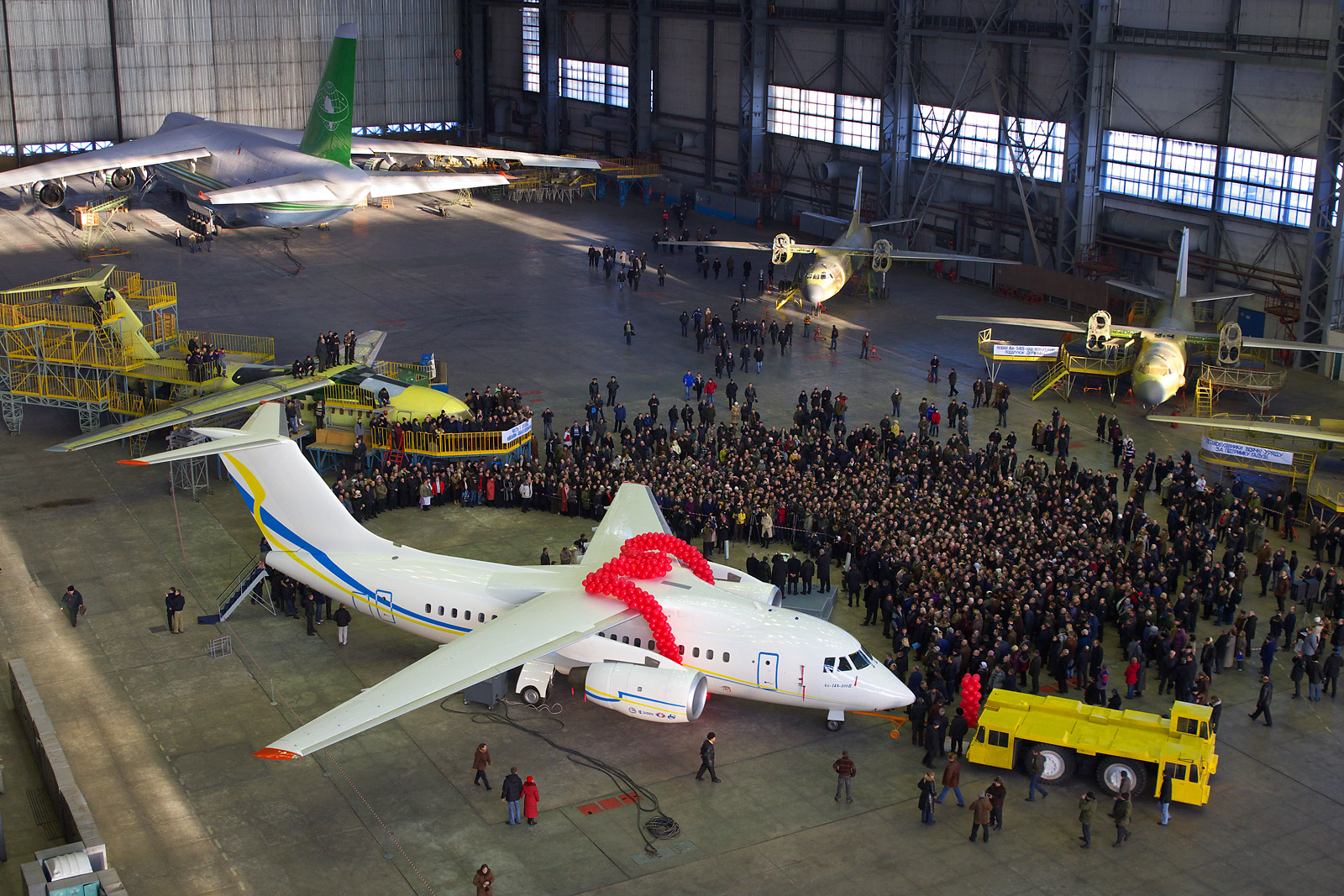
- Rollout of the first serially-produced An-148 at AVIANT's gigantic hangar in Kyiv, 2009. An An-124 under maintenance seen in the far corner of the hangar.
- Native name: Серійний завод «Антонов»
- Type: State-owned company
- Industry: Aircraft manufacturing
- Founded: 1920
- Founder: Government of the Ukrainian SSR and the Soviet Union
- Headquarters: Kyiv, Ukraine
- Key people: Dmytro Kiva (chairman of the Board of Directors)
- Products: Antonov-designed airplanes
- Parent: Antonov
- Website: www.antonov.com/en/services

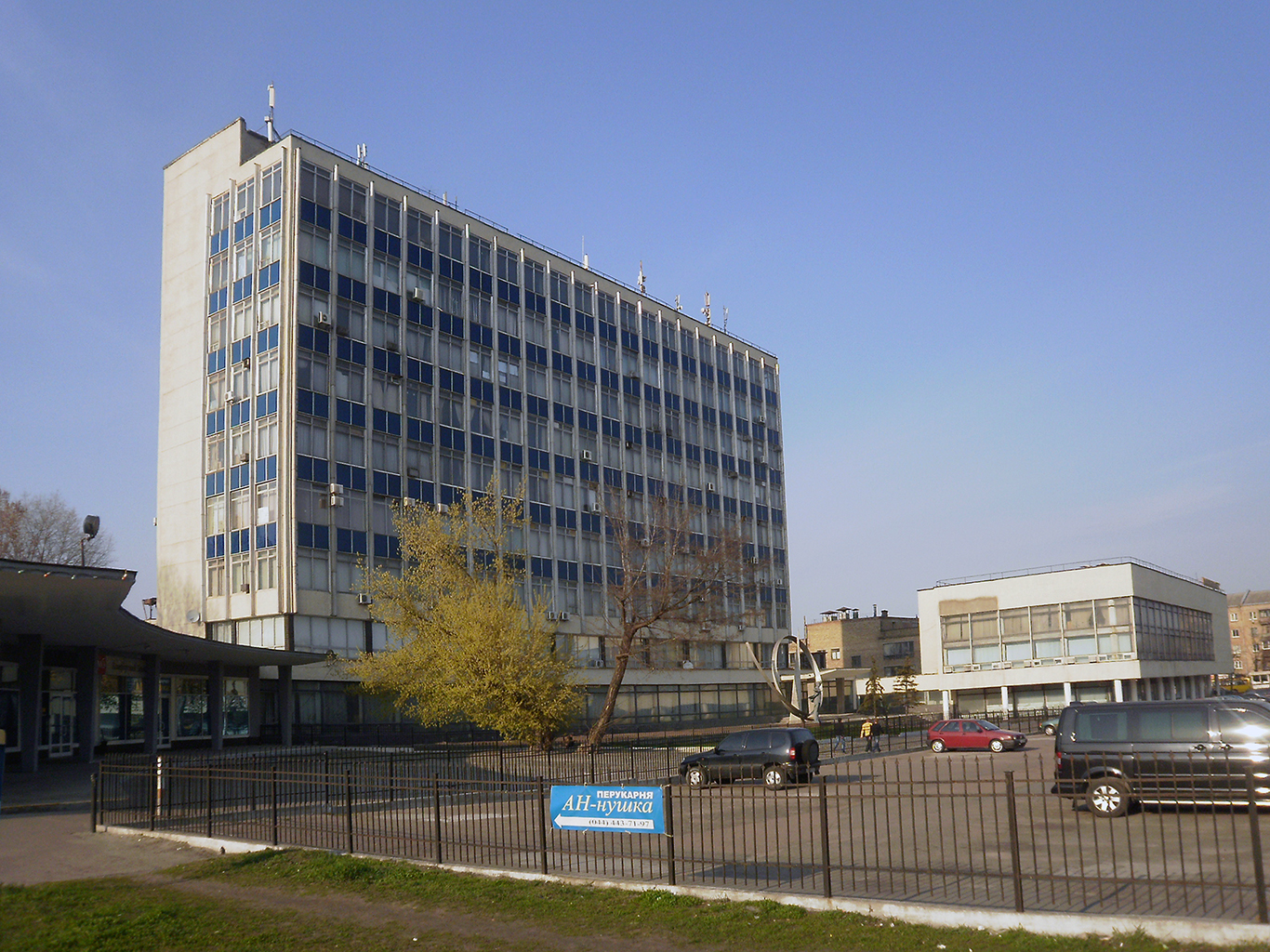
Administration building

The Antonov Serial Production Plant (Ukrainian: Серійний завод «Антонов»), formerly AVIANT (Ukrainian: АВІАНТ), is an aircraft manufacturing company in Kyiv, Ukraine, the serial manufacturing division of the Antonov. “Antonov” serial production plant's office and industrial premises are located at the Sviatoshyn Airfield in Kyiv, between the districts of Nyvky, Sviatoshyn and Bilychi.

== History ==
The production plant was established by decision of the War Industry Council on 9 September 1920, under the name of "State Aircraft Plant 12" (GAZ-12). It consisted of small uncoordinated workshops and until the war was located on Garmatna Street.

The plant performed overhaul of foreign aircraft models used by the military. It had no aerodrome of its own, and aircraft were tested at Post-Volynsky aerodrome (Kyiv International Airport (Zhuliany)). In 1922 the plant was renamed “Remvozdukh-6”. In 1925 the first domestic aircraft, the K-1, was designed and built under guidance of the designer Konstyantyn Kalinin. The maiden flight was 26 July 1925. In 1931 the plant was renamed “Plant 43”. In 1932 the facilities produced the first domestic gyroplane “4-EA” TSAGI. The same year, production of the first domestic high-speed 6-seater aircraft began, the KHAI-1. It had a speed of 324 km/h, a ceiling of 7000 m and a range of over 1,000 km with a payload of up to 1,000 kg. It was the first European airplane with retractable landing gear. The maiden flight was on 8 October 1932. A total of 43 KHAI-1 were manufactured. In 1937 the works manufactured the OKO-1.

In 1939-1941 the facilities began assembly of MiG aircraft. When the plant was bombed on 25 June 1941, the works were evacuated to Novosibirsk, to V.P. Chkalov Facilities where it produced the fighters Yak-3, Yak-6 and Yak-9 designed by Alexander Sergeyevich Yakovlev.

After Kyiv was liberated from the Nazis, the plant was returned there, where until the end of the war it overhauled PO-2 aircraft and assembled Yak-3 and Yak-9 fighters from parts manufactured elsewhere. In 1944 the plant was renamed "Plant 473", or "Organization Mailbox 11". After the end of the war the plant was moved to the present location in Sviatoshin, which it had started to develop before 1941.

In 1947-1948 the plant manufactured a pilot batch of five helicopters Mi-1 designed by Mikhail Mil, but the series production was transferred to another enterprise.

In 1948 the works started production of the An-2, the ancestor of the great Antonov family, designed by Oleg Konstantinovich Antonov. The plant produced 18 modifications of the An-2: transport, passenger, agricultural, water bomber for fighting forest fires, a version for fish shoals exploration, a version for scientific and rescue operations in Arctic conditions, etc. The “Aviant” plant manufactured 3,320 An-2s.

Between 1954 and 1956 the Aviant produced the prototype of the military transport aircraft An-8, a twin-engine turboprop. It was the first of a long line of Antonov aircraft with high wings and rear loading cargo ramps. Between 1959 and 1978 the plant manufactured the An-24 (1,028 airplanes produced). It is in 1967 that the plant was renamed “Kyiv Aircraft Plant”, or “Organization Mailbox M-5249”.

From 1969 to 1985 the plant manufactured the transport An-26 (1,402 airplanes produced). In 1973 an aerial photography aircraft was produced, the An-30 (123 airplanes produced). On April 30, 1974, the plant was renamed once again to be baptised “Kyiv Aviation Production Association”.

Between 1976 and 1979 the plant manufactured a pilot batch of the An-72 (5 airplanes produced). Series production of the An-72 was transferred to Kharkiv facilities, and “Aviant” was charged with mastering production of the unique An-124 "Ruslan", the world's biggest aircraft. Between 1979 and 2004 the plant produced 19 An-124s. Since 1979 the plant has been manufacturing the An-32; as of May 1, 2004, 361 had been produced. From 1985 to 1988 the plant participated in the manufacture of parts for the An-225 "Mriya", designed to carry the shuttle Buran. Yet, as the space program was suspended, only one An-225 "Mriya" was produced.

On 5 August 1992, the plant was yet again renamed “National Enterprise Kyiv Aviation Plant” before being renamed on 27 August 1995, to “Kyiv Aviation Plant Aviant” and in 2010 to its present name “Antonov Serial Production Plant”.

On 14 March 2022, it was severely damaged by the Russian military airforce.

== Awards ==
- On September 8, 1970 the plant was awarded the Order of the Red Banner of Labour for its achievements in the production of aviation equipment.
- On October 15, 1980 the plant was awarded an International Prize "Gold Mercury" in special recognition of the contribution to the development of production and international cooperation.
- In 1995 the plant was awarded the Birmingham Torch Award for successful economic survival and development in the context of the socio-economic crisis.

== See also ==
- Kyiv Sviatoshyn Airfield
