= Antonov A-9 =

General information
- Type: Single seat sailplane
- Designer: O.K. Antonov
- Number built: 27

History
- First flight: 1948

The Antonov A-9 was a single-seat sailplane designed and built in the USSR in the 1940s, a development of the record setting Red Front 7.

== Design and development ==
Oleg Antonov had designed sailplanes since the early 1930s, most memorably the Red Front 7 which, flown by Olga Klepikova, set a world distance record of 749 km (465 mi) that stood from 1939 to 1951. The A-9 is seen as a development of that aircraft, though detailed information from this period of Soviet aviation is often limited. The fuselages and tail units of the two aircraft were very similar but the wings were quite different.

The A-9 was a cantilever, shoulder wing monoplane. In plan, the wing had a short, constant chord centre section and long, straight tapered outer panels, with a sweep on both edges, terminating in rounded and downward-curled wingtips. The panels were demountable from the centre section for transport; unusually, the centre section was an integral part of the fuselage structure, its single box spar spanning the 3.2 m (10 ft) section unbroken. The spar continued beyond the central section-outer panel joint, the whole wing having plywood covering ahead of the spar and aircraft fabric covering aft. Long span, tapered, fabric covered and mass balanced ailerons occupied about two-thirds of the trailing edges of the outer panels; these panels also carried Schempp-Hirth-type airbrakes, placed just behind the spar and ending at the panel mounting joint. The wing section was slightly reflexed towards the rear and thick, with maximum depth far forward at only about 20% chord, making the profile steep-nosed.

The ply-covered fuselage of the A-9 was oval in cross-section, deep ahead of the wings and almost circular to the rear, giving it a pod-and-boom appearance. The fixed tail surfaces were also ply-covered, the fin narrow but with a small fuselage fillet. The control surfaces were fabric covered. In plan the horizontal tail was tapered with sweep on both edges; the broad, curved and balanced rudder reached to the keel and was hinged well aft, almost in line with the elevator trailing edge, for clearance and moment. The upper fuselage line was almost flat, even over the rear part of the long, two piece canopy, though its windscreen curved down sharply into the nose. There was no skid or wheeled undercarriage; instead the A-9 was launched from a wheeled, drop-off dolly and landed on the locally internally strengthened fuselage underside, aided by a tail bumper.

Overall, the structure of the A-9 was heavy and so the wing loading was high at 30.5 kg/m^{2} (6.2 lb/ft^{2}), compared, for example, with the Slingsby T.25 Gull 4, a contemporary glider with a wing loading of 22.3 kg/m^{2} (4.6 lb/ft^{2}). Higher wing loadings provide higher speeds and better glide angles between thermals but poor climbing in weak lift. The Red Front 7 is known to have used water ballast on its record flight but the A-9 was not thus equipped.

== Operational history ==
Because of their speed, the A-9s concentrated mostly on competition flying and record setting.

== Variants ==
Data from Sailplanes 1945–1965

16.24 m (53.3 ft) span
Standard version.
16.50 m (54.1 ft) extended span
Weight increased by 10 kg (22 lb) but useful load 100 kg (220 lb) as standard, wing area decreased to 12.2 m^{2} (131 sq ft), wing loading 34.5 kg/m^{2} (7.0 lb/ft^{2}). This version may have been named the Antonov A-10, though other sources associate this designation with a two-seat variant of the A-9.

== Specifications ==
Data from Sailplanes 1945–1965

General characteristics

- Capacity: one
- Length: 6.40 m (21 ft 0 in)
- Wingspan: 16.24 m (53 ft 3 in)
- Wing area: 13.46 m^{2} (144.9 sq ft)
- Aspect ratio: 19.6
- Airfoil: TsAGI R-III
- Empty weight: 310 kg (683 lb)
- Gross weight: 410 kg (904 lb)

Performance

- Rate of sink: 0.8 m/s (160 ft/min)
- Lift-to-drag: Maximum 30:1
- Wing loading: 30.5 kg/m^{2} (6.2 lb/sq ft)
- Landing speed:70 km/h; 38 kn (44 mph)
