= Antonov An-148 =

Ukrainian regional jet aircraft

Antonov An-148/An-158
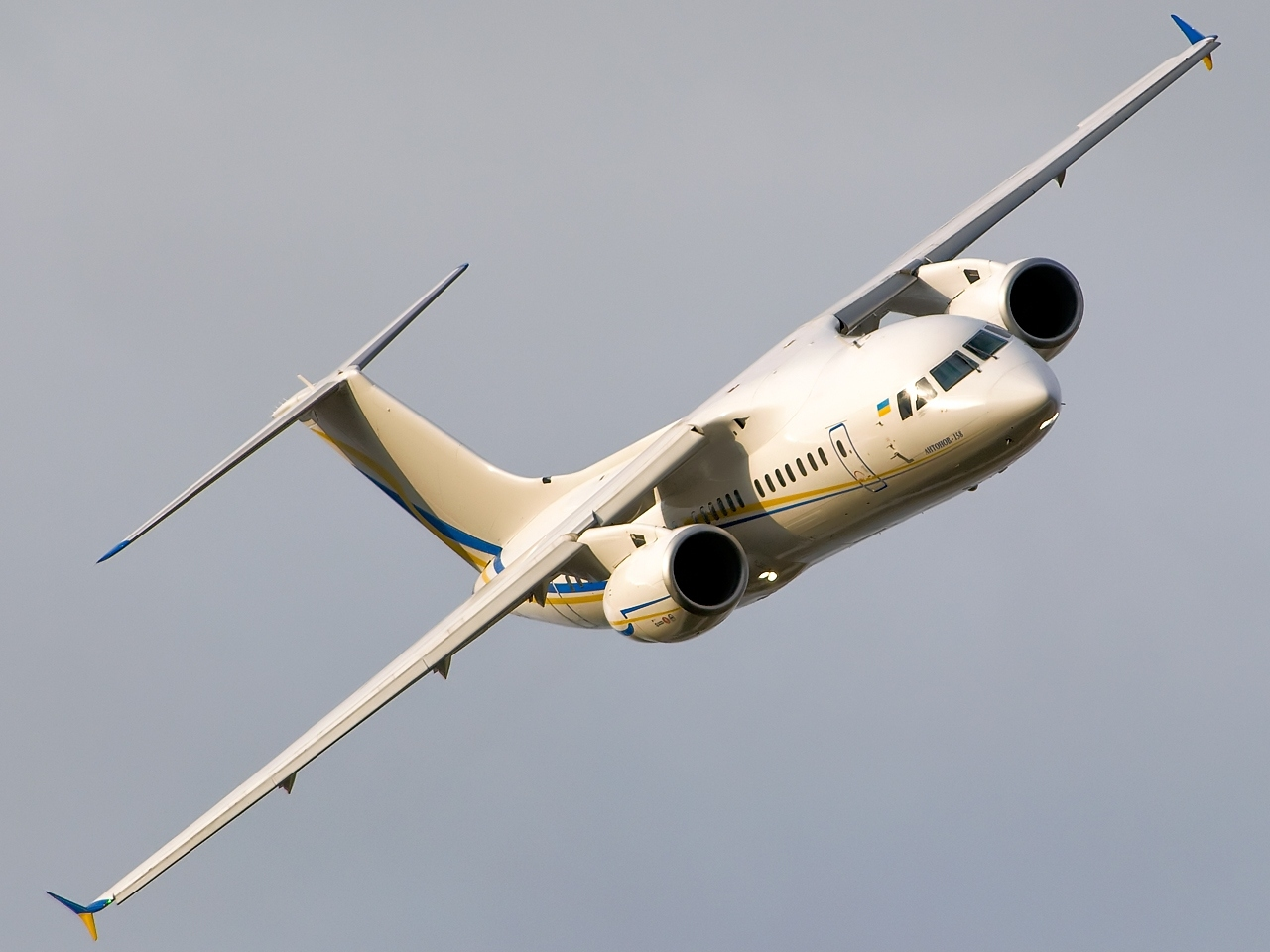
- Antonov An-158

General information
- Type: Regional jet airliner
- National origin: Ukraine
- Designer: Antonov
- Built by: Antonov Serial Production Plant; Voronezh Aircraft Production Association
- Status: In service
- Primary users: Russian Ministry of Defence Cubana de Aviación (historical); Angara Airlines (historical); Air Koryo
- Number built: 47

History
- Introduction date: 2 June 2009
- First flight: 17 December 2004 (An-148); 28 April 2010 (An-158)
- Developed from: Antonov An-74
- Developed into: Antonov An-178

The Antonov An-148 (Ukrainian: Антонов Ан-148) is a regional jet designed and primarily built by the Ukrainian aerospace manufacturer Antonov of Ukraine. Between 2009 and 2018, the An-148 was also being produced on a second production line in Russia by Voronezh Aircraft Production Association; however, production of the type in Russia was discontinued as a consequence of the wider souring political relations between Ukraine and Russia. While the last Russian-built An-148 was completed in October 2018, Ukraine continued to both produce and develop the type.

Development of the aircraft was started in the 1990s, although the An-148 name was not associated to the project prior to 2001. On 17 December 2004, the prototype performed its maiden flight. The aircraft completed its certification programme on 26 February 2007. On 2 June 2009, the first An-148 entered commercial service with the Ukrainian carrier Aerosvit. The largest export customer for the type was the Russian Ministry of Defence, which ordered 15 Russian-produced An-148s. The An-148 has a maximum range of 2,100–4,400 km (1,100–2,400 nmi; 1,300–2,700 mi) and is able to carry 68–85 passengers, depending on the configuration. The Antonov An-158 is a stretched fuselage version of the aircraft, accommodating up to 100 passengers.

Following a crash in February 2018, all An-148 and An-158 in Russia were grounded by the Russian Ministry of Transport. That same year, the Cuban state airline Cubana de Aviación also grounded its An-158 fleet amid reports of technical issues with the aircraft. By the end of 2021, the An-148 reportedly remained in commercial service with a limited number of airlines, including the North Korean state airline Air Koryo, the Russian carrier Angara Airlines, and the Ukrainian start-up Air Ocean Airlines.

== Development ==
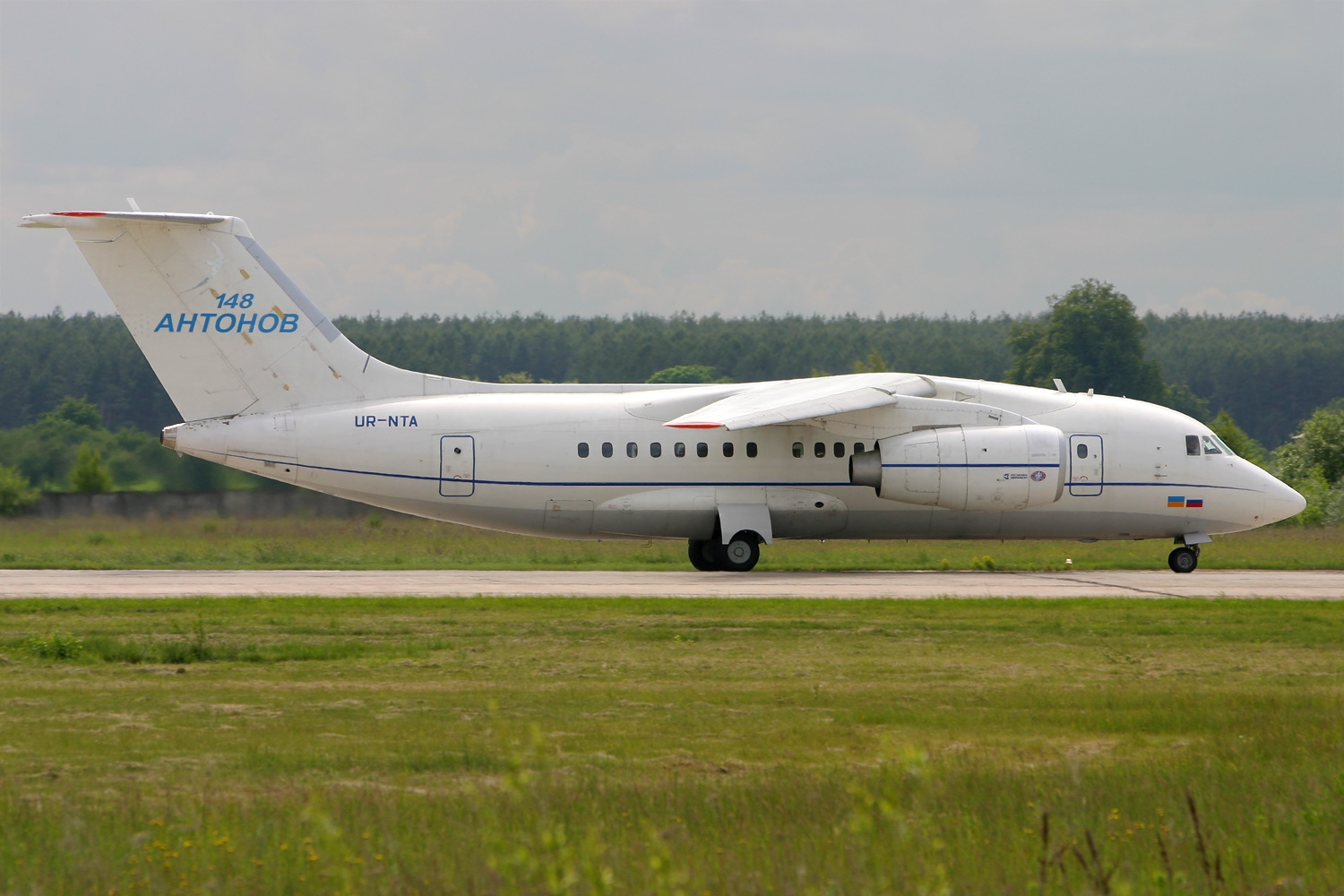
The first prototype. It made its maiden flight on 17 December 2004.

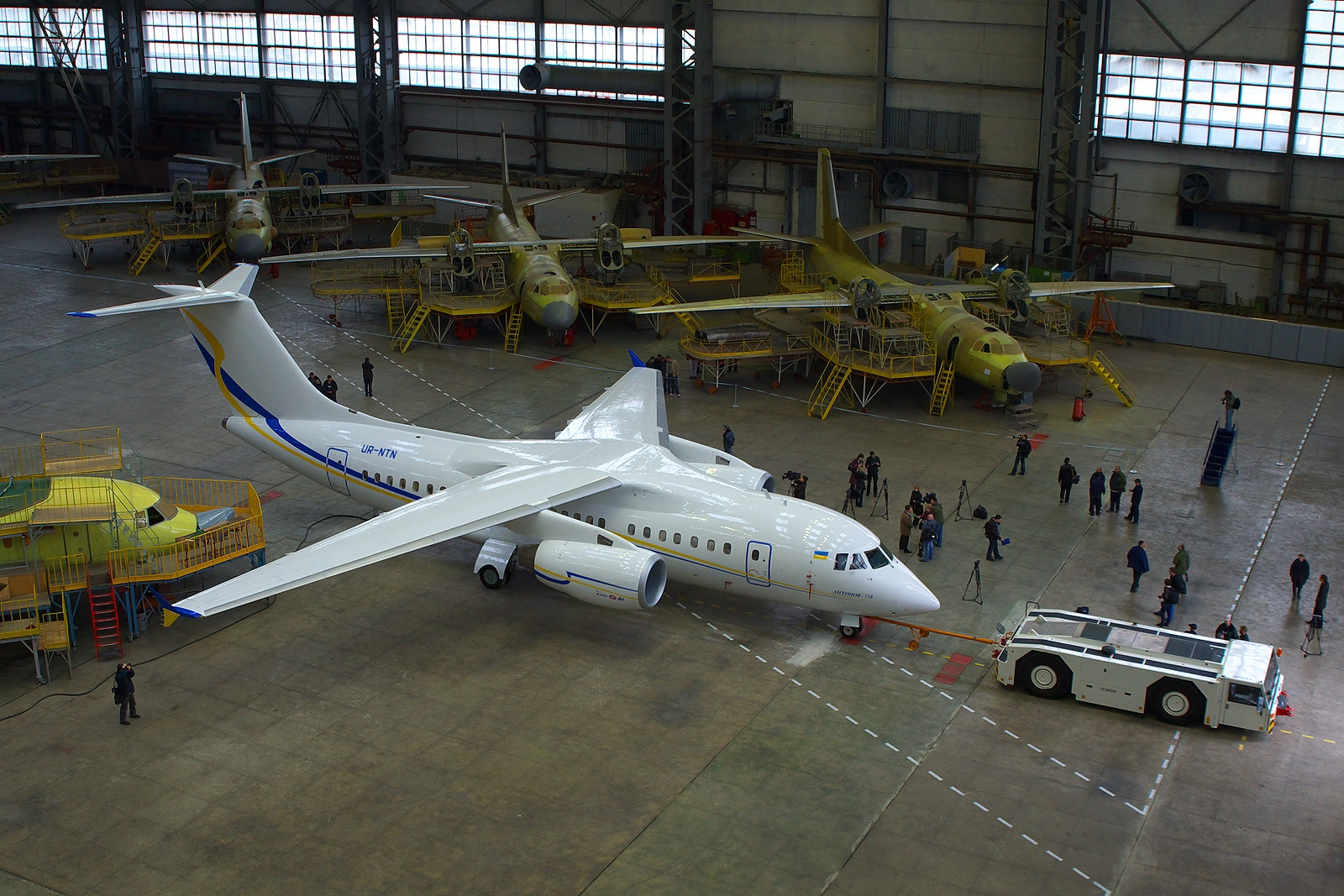
The first An-158 in April 2010, before its first presentation

The beginning of the An-148 project dates to the early 1990s, when work on modifying the existing Antonov An-74 for passenger duties started, headed by Petro Balabuev. In 2001, the project was redesignated An-148. Changes from the earlier An-74 include the extension of the fuselage and the adoption of a clean-sheet wing design. It was decided to adopt a high-wing design for the An-148 as this would be well-suited to operations from austere airstrips and rough runways; this compatibility was viewed as appealing to certain operators in the remote areas of Russia as well as across Africa and Asia as well.

Another early decision was to power the type using a pair of Ukrainian-build Motor Sich D-436-148 engines. According to Antonov, other variants of the An-148 that were equipped with Western-made engines, producing thrust of 58.86–78.48 kN (6,002–8,003 kgf; 13,230–17,640 lbf) (such as the General Electric CF34 or Rolls-Royce BR700) were openly being considered during the mid 2000s. Around this time, Antonov was reportedly actively pursuing a higher level of Western participation in the An-148 programme; by 2008, 13 Western firms were reportedly involved in aspects of the aircraft. Furthermore, Antonov adopted a Western-style shared risk model for the funding and develop of the An-148, including for its aftersales support model.

In 2002, production of the first three prototypes was begun at AVIANT. On 17 December 2004, the first prototype completed its maiden flight. The second prototype joined the testing programme in April 2005. During the certification programme, the two prototypes performed about 600 flights in total. On 26 February 2007, the aircraft, its D-436-148 engine and the AI-450-МS auxiliary power unit were certified by both the Interstate Aviation Committee of Russia and the State Aviation Administration of Ukraine.

During 2008, Antonov announced that, in response to customer demand, it was launching development of a stretched version of the An-148 regional passenger aircraft, initially referred to as the An-148-200, capable of seating up to 99 passengers in a single-class cabin configuration. In the following year, this stretched model was rebranded as the An-158; furthermore, a proposed business jet derivative, which had been previously referred to as the Sky Cruiser and intended to seat between eight and 41 passengers, had also been rebranded as the An-168. One of the An-148 prototypes, which was dissembled for structural analysis after completing 600 mission during certification trials between December 2004 and February 2007, was subsequently rebuilt as the first An-158. In April 2010, the An-158 prototype performed its first flight; Russian type certification was received in February 2011.

The An-148 was manufactured at both the Ukrainian Kyiv AVIANT plant (now Antonov Serial Production Plant) and Russia's Voronezh Aircraft Production Association (VASO) - the latter was produced under licence from Antonov. Under a production-sharing agreement signed in 2005, Russian enterprises were responsible for producing nearly 70 percent of the aircraft's components while the remainder were sourced from Ukrainian manufacturers; VASO alone supplied the An-148’s tail section, rear fuselage, engine pylons and high-lift devices. In 2009, the list price of the An-148 was about $24–30 million. On 28 June 2009, the first serially produced An-148, manufactured at VASO in Voronezh, took to the skies. A persistent difficulty of the An-148 programme was its slow rate of production, which furthermore proved to be difficult to expand. In light of the then-independent AVIANT plant's initial failure to satisfy growing demand for the An-148, VASO became increasingly involved in the aircraft's manufacture. Between 2009 and 2018, VASO completed a total of 33 An-148s.

During June 2017, VASO announced that the two final Russian-assembled An-148s would be delivered shortly, after which the project would not see further development. In early 2018, Ukraine affirmatively banned sales of Progress D-436 aircraft engines to Russia as a consequence of the 2014 Russian annexation of Crimea. During October of that year, it was announced that, amid continued disagreements between Russia and Ukraine that could interfere not only with production but also after-sales support of the type, VASO was formally replacing its An-148 production line with one for the Ilyushin Il-112 instead.

Numerous variants and derivatives were envisioned for the An-148. For Siberian operators, Antonov planned a model with a higher gross weight and additional fuel capacity in the center tank, extending the range with 75 passengers from 2,198 km (1,187 nmi; 1,366 mi) to 3,598 km (1,943 nmi; 2,236 mi). An "E" variant was also planned to offer a special 5,100 km (2,800 nmi; 3,200 mi) range, which would have served as a platform for the "E1", capable of non-stop Moscow-Vladivostok 6,995 km (3,777 nmi; 4,346 mi) services carrying 44 passengers.

== Design ==
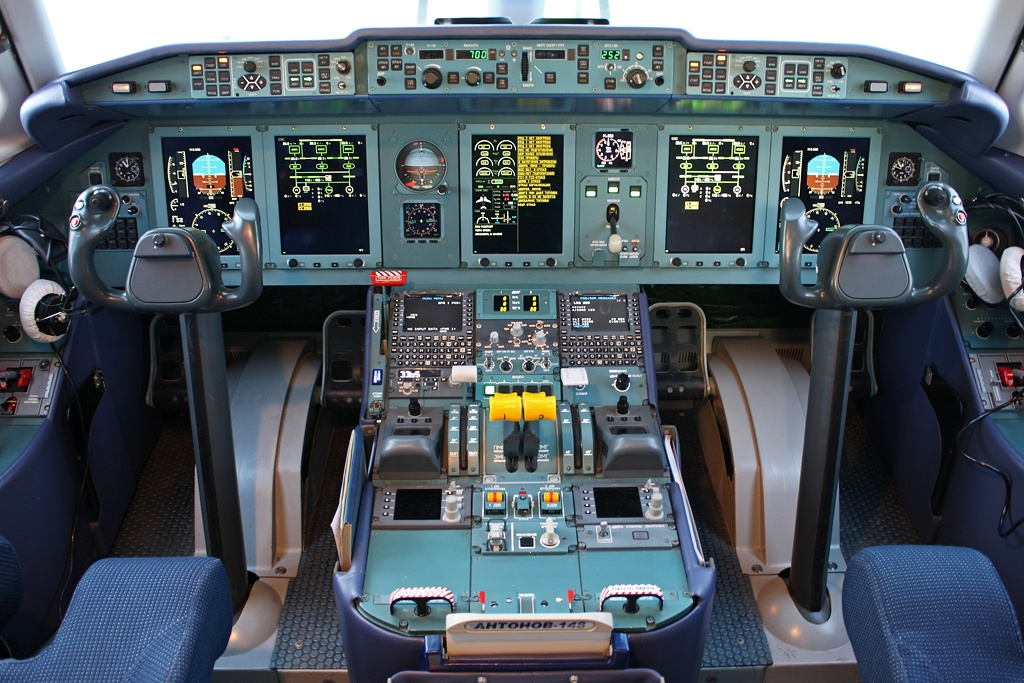
Flight deck

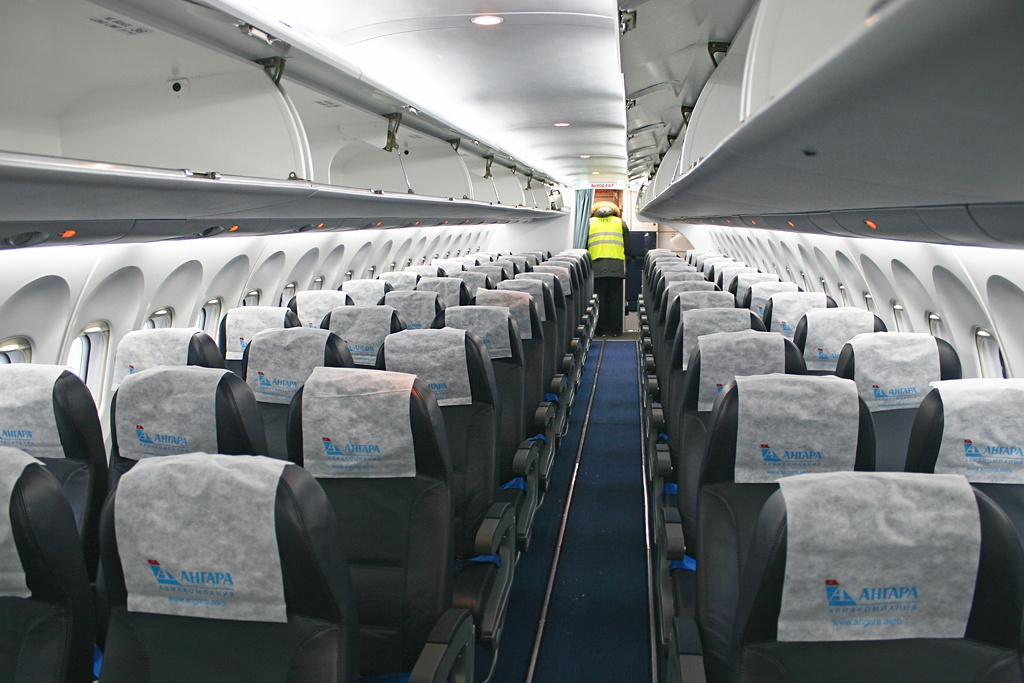
2+3 seating

The Antonov An-148 is a high-wing monoplane that is powered by a pair of turbofan engines that are mounted in pods under the wing. This arrangement protects the engines and wing structure against foreign object damage. The manufacturer claims high fuel efficiency of the Motor Sich D-436-148 engines. Several features, such as the built-in autodiagnosis system, auxiliary power unit, and the wing configuration, allow the An-148 to be flown to and from austere airstrips. In the cockpit, information from the flight and navigation systems are displayed on five 15 by 20 cm (5.9 by 7.9 in) liquid crystal display panels built by Russia's Aviapribor. The An-148 is equipped with a fly-by-wire flight control system, which enables the An-148 to operate day and night conditions under instrument flight rules on high-density air routes; it can also be flown under visual flight rules under suitable weather conditions. Similar to the Boeing 737, the main landing gear rotates into the belly of the aircraft when in flight, with partial doors covering the legs, and the sides of the tires remaining exposed. The An-148 features a built-in airstair to enable boarding and disembarking the aircraft without extra ground equipment.

The An-148-100 regional aircraft is the main model of the An-148. It seats 70 passengers at 864 mm (34.0 in) or up to 80 passengers at 762 mm (30.0 in) pitch in a one-class 2+3 seating layout. The aircraft is also configurable in a multiple-class layout which can carry fewer passengers, typically with four abreast business class. Other models have been designed for roles including medical evacuation and with an English-language cockpit (for use by Western countries). The stretched An-158, unlike the base An-148, can be outfitted with winglets, which Antonov have stated to have resulted in an 8.5 percent improvement in fuel efficiency.

== Operational history ==
In April 2005, the Ilyushin Finance Leasing Company ordered the first series of An-148 for the Krasair airline. Lease agreement calls for ten aircraft with an option for five units valued at $270 million.

On 2 June 2009, the first An-148 entered commercial service with the Ukrainian carrier Aerosvit. The first passenger flight was from Kharkiv to Kyiv; the aircraft had the civilian registration UR-NTA. By November 2009, Aerosvit was operating the An-148 on the Kyiv–Odesa and Simferopol–Lviv routes, performing two flights per day with the average flight time of 4–5 hours.

On 21 December 2009, the An-148 was put into service in Russia with the airline Rossiya; the first passenger flight was FV135 from Pulkovo Airport in Saint Petersburg to Sheremetyevo International Airport in Moscow. By 20 May 2010, Rossiya's An-148 fleet had accumulated a total of 915 flight hours and performed 710 landings. In October 2010, Rossiya publicly complained that the aircraft was suffering from problems that impacted its reliability; during the first three months of service, the An-148 reportedly encountered one in-flight technical failure every 344 hours. In addition to the allegedly technical problems with the An-148, there were also claims that pilot shortages were occurring due to difficulty in ramping up sufficient training capacity for the type. However, by 2011 the situation had reportedly improved, permitting fleet utilisation to noticeably rise.

On 15 February 2010, the An-148 started international flights to the European Union (Poland) with the Aerosvit airline.

In December 2011, the Russian government awarded a $65 million contract for a pair of VIP-configured An-148s; delivered over the following two years, these were operated by the Special Air Detachment and used to transport senior Russian government officials. Around this time, Ukraine was reportedly considering procuring a similar-configured An-148 specifically for transporting the President of Ukraine.

On 18 April 2013, the first serial An-158 version was delivered to the Cuban flagship airline Cubana de Aviación. According to Antonov, Cubana placed an order for a pair of additional aircraft, while other sources have claimed that the follow-on order was for ten aircraft. On 28 April 2013, Ukraine's Antonov aircraft maker handed over a third An-158 passenger airliner to Cuba and signed a contract for the delivery of three more.

In April 2016, the Indian company Reliance defense limited and Antonov entered into an agreement to construct an aircraft based on An 148/An 158 for both defense and commercial purposes.

In April 2017, Cubana de Aviación suspended its flights between Havana and Guantánamo due to technical problems with its An-158 fleet. The route from Havana to Holguín also had problems: of 116 planned flights in the first months of 2017, 38 were cancelled and 36 suffered significant delays. Yoanka Acosta, head of Cubana's commercial division, explained that the planes were leased from Ukraine but spare parts were sourced from Russia, thus the state of conflict between the two countries had affected the supply of parts, making maintenance difficult. In late April, however, representatives from Antonov and Cubana met and signed a service agreement that extended the aircraft's navigation directives to 3,600 flights and guaranteed the supply of spare parts, although it did not specify a date for normalization.

In March 2018, Rostransnadzor suspended all flights of An-148 in Russia after the crash on 11 February 2018.

In May 2018, Cubana de Aviación grounded its An-158 fleet after it received an order from the Cuban National Aviation Authority after "multiple and repeating failures (had) been found in complex systems, built by mechanical, hydraulic and electrical components, as well as computer performance algorithms", in addition to "evidence of design and manufacturing flaws, serious issues in flight control system, cracks in the structure and engine temperature increase above normal parameters".

On 18 September 2023, the Ukrainian military intelligence claimed a raid against Chkalovsky Air Base, near Moscow, occurred, during which an An-148 was deliberately damaged.

Production
Total	2018	2017	2016	2015	2014	2013	2012	2011	2010	2009	2008	2007	2006	2005	2004
47	3	2	3	5	5	9	4	6	6	2	0	0	0	1	1

== Variants ==
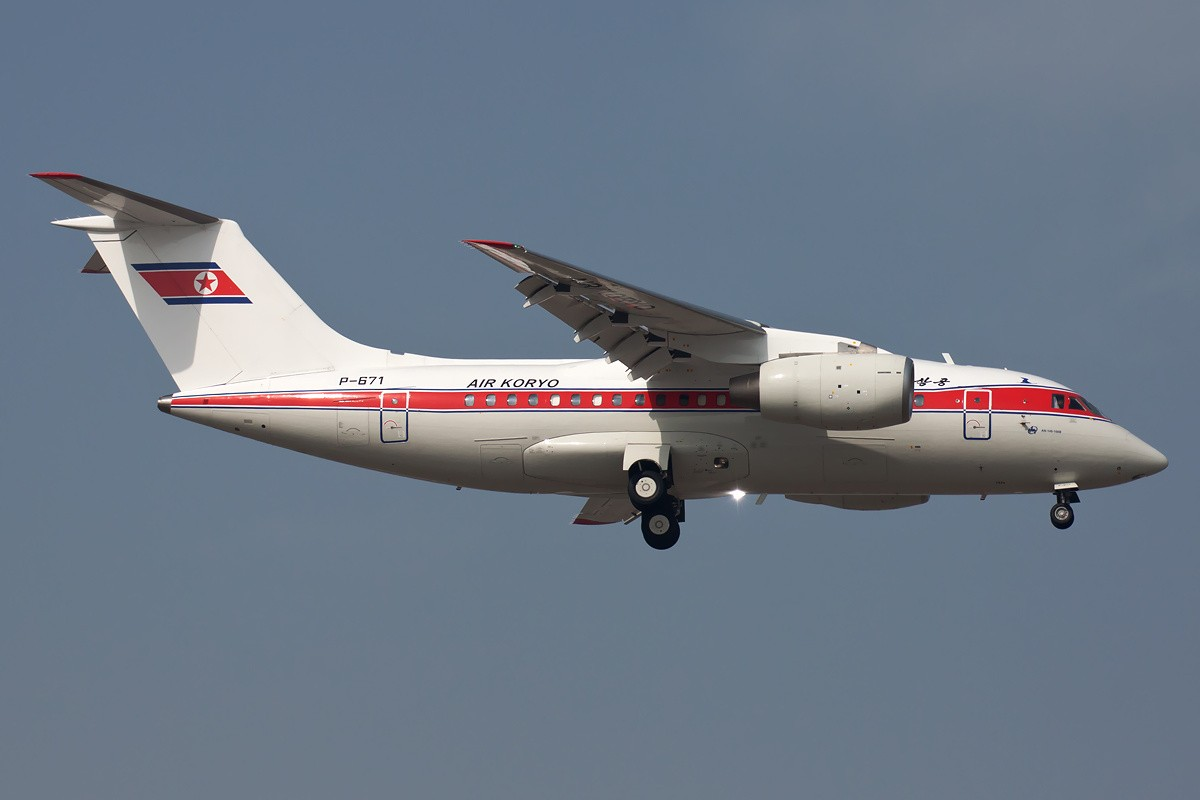
The 29.13 m long An-148

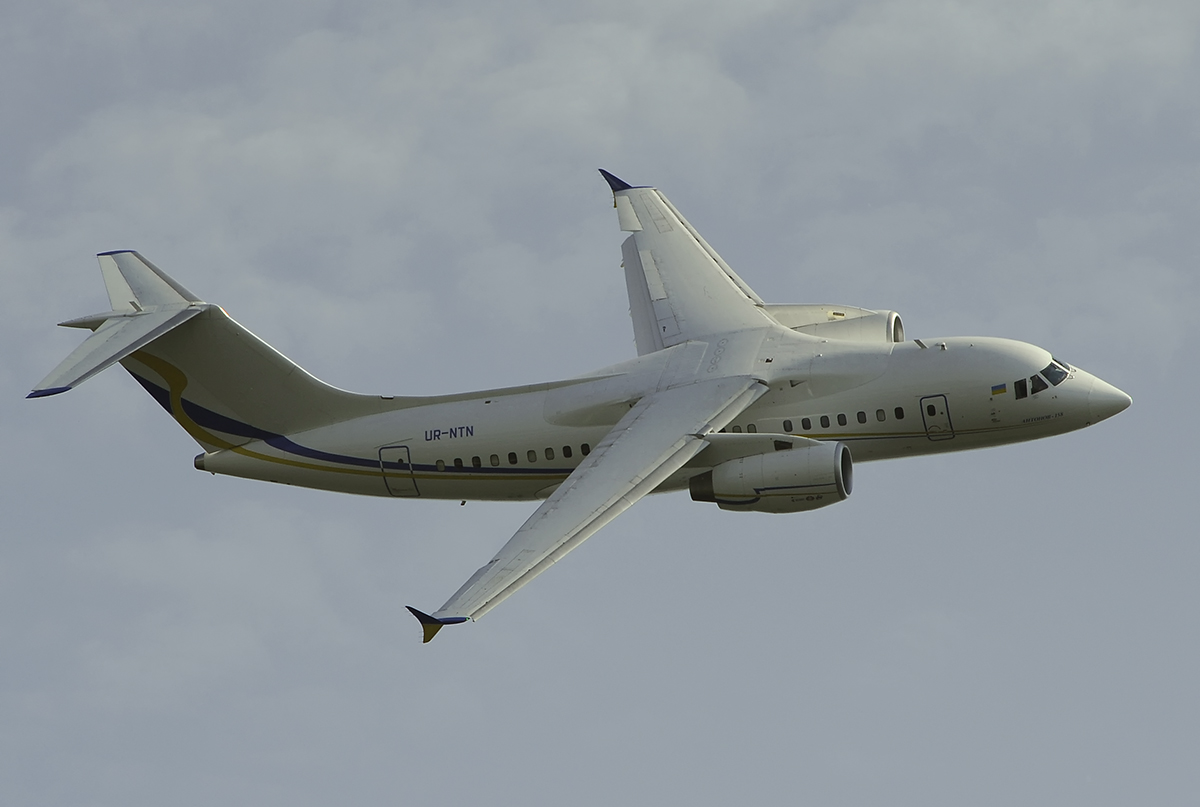
The 1.7m longer An-158

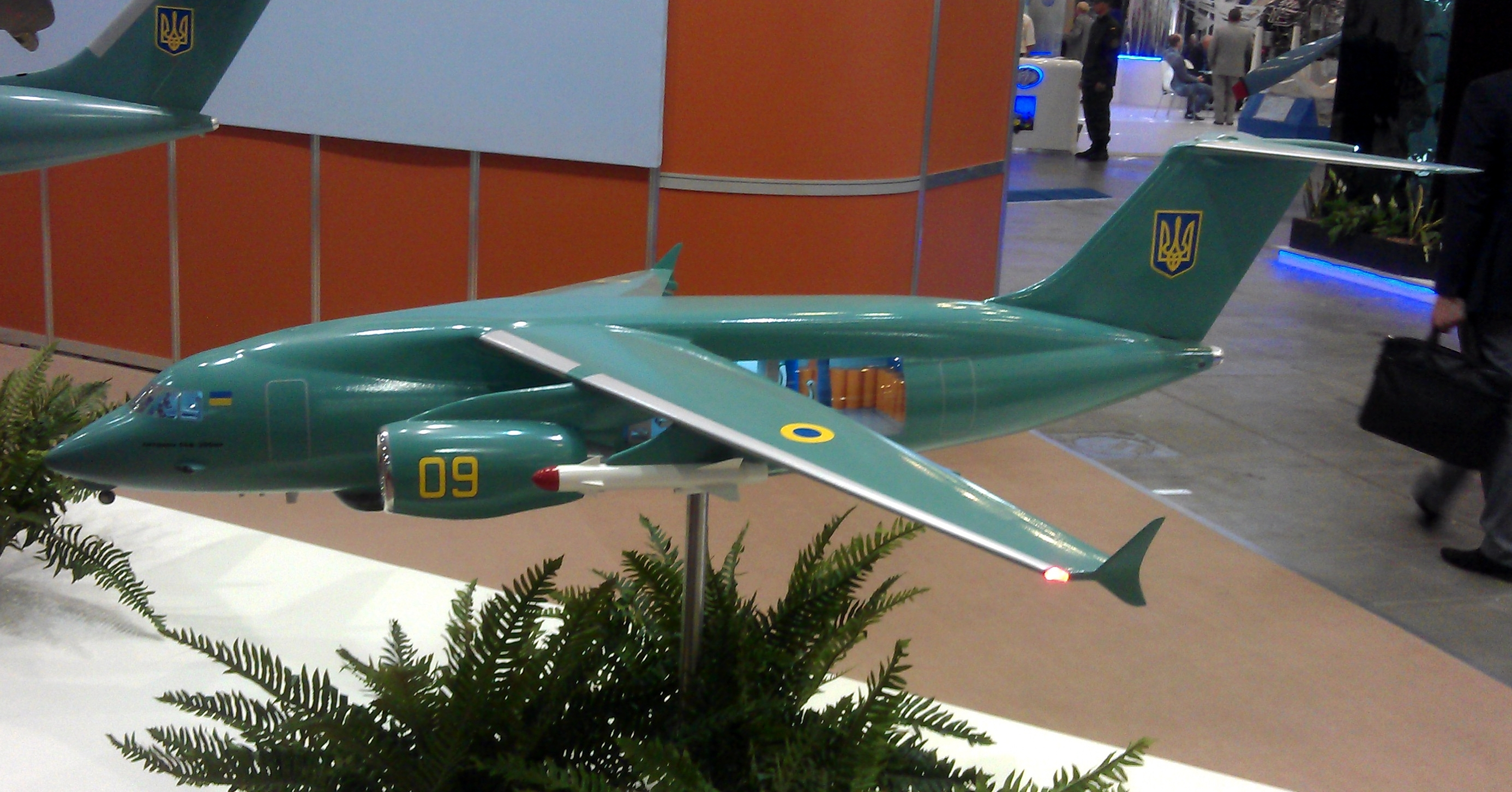
Proposed military An-148-300MP

An-148-100A
Main version of the An-148. It has a passenger capacity of 85 in a one-class dense configuration or 68 in a two-class configuration, and a range of 2,100 km (1,100 nmi; 1,300 mi)
An-148-100B
extended-range version, up to 3,500 km (1,900 nmi; 2,200 mi)
An-148-100E
Extended-range version, up to 4,400 km (2,400 nmi; 2,700 mi) and a maximum takeoff weight (MTOW) of 43.7 t (43,700 kg; 96,000 lb)
An-148-200
Unified with An-158 by the rear part of the fuselage. Hence maximum seating capacity is increased to 89 passengers in dense configuration, comparing to 85 for An-148-100. Planned for production in Kyiv with An-158.
An-148-300
previously called An-168, business variant, seating 8-40 passengers, with a range up to 7,000 km (3,800 nmi; 4,300 mi)
An-148DRLV
proposed airborne early warning and control variant.
An-158
stretched fuselage version for 99 passengers in a one-class standard configuration. Other changes include the installation of wingtip fences. The airplane successfully completed its first flight on 28 April 2010, with flight certification tests planned to be completed before the end of 2010; on 3 March 2011, it was given Russian certification. Nowadays, after flight and land test in night lands airports of Ecuador (Latacunga / Cotopaxi International Airport, 2806 m AMSL) and Bolivia (La Paz / El Alto International Airport, 4061 m AMSL) in November 2013 prepare documentation for obtaining correspondent supplements to the type certificate of this airplane.
An-178
cargo variant, with a payload capacity of 15 t (15,000 kg; 33,000 lb). The wing outer panels (including winglets), front fuselage with cockpit and nosewheel leg come from the An-158. The cargo hold is slightly enlarged, and there is an extra pair of main-wheels on each side. The An-178 was previously known as the An-148T, which would have had the Progress AI-727 turbofan as a potential power plant option.
HESA IrAn-148
Designation of An-148 aircraft proposed for license production from knocked down kits in Iran.

== Orders and deliveries ==
The following sheet depicts all known orders and deliveries of An-148 aircraft. However it is unclear if all of them are currently operational:

Airline	Order	Delivered	Refs
Air Koryo	2	2	
Angara Airlines	5	5	
Russian Ministry of Defence	15	15	
Russian Ministry of Emergency Situations	2	2	
Russian Presidential Administration	5	3	
Ukraine Air Enterprise	2	2	
Border Guard Service of Russia	3	2	
Cubana de Aviación	6	6	
Total	40	37	

== Incidents and accidents ==
- On 5 March 2011, an Antonov An-148 (assembled by VASO) carrying test registration 61708 crashed during a test flight in Russia's Belgorod Oblast after an inflight breakup, killing all six crew members on board. An investigation commission found that the crew permitted the aircraft to accelerate more than 60 knots above its "Never Exceed" speed in an emergency descent, which led to the inflight breakup. Witnesses on the ground reported a wing had separated from the aircraft in flight. The aircraft was due to be delivered to Myanmar.
- On 11 February 2018, an Antonov An-148 operating as Saratov Airlines Flight 703, crashed shortly after takeoff near Ramenskoye, outside of Moscow. The aircraft was carrying 65 passengers and six crew members. There were no survivors. This is the first fatal commercial accident for this aircraft type.

== Specifications ==
Three-view diagram

Antonov An-148 specifications
Variant	148-100E	158 *
Cockpit crew	2	
Seats	68–85	86–99
Seat pitch	76–89 cm (30–35 in)	76–86 cm (30–34 in)
Cargo	14.60 m^{3} (516 cu ft)	–
Length	29.13 m (95 ft 7 in)	30.83 m (101 ft 2 in)
Wingspan	28.91 m (94 ft 10 in)	
Wing area	87.32 m^{2} (939.9 sq ft)	
Height	8.19 m (26 ft 10 in)	
Cabin	3.15 m (10 ft 4 in) width × 2.00 m (6 ft 7 in) height	
MTOW	43,700 kg (96,300 lb)	
Max. payload	9,000 kg (20,000 lb)	5,000 kg (11,000 lb)
OEW	22,000 kg (49,000 lb)	
Max. fuel	12,050 kg (26,570 lb)	
Turbofan (x 2)	Progress D-436-148	D-436
Thrust (x 2)	14,000 lbf; 63 kN	15,100 lbf; 67.0 kN
Ceiling	12,200 m (40,000 ft)	
Cruise	800 to 870 km/h (430 to 470 kn; 500 to 540 mph)	
Range (75 pax/max PL)	4,400 km (2,400 nmi; 2,700 mi)	2,500 km (1,300 nmi; 1,600 mi)
Fuel burn	1,650 kg/h (3,600 lb/h)	1,800 kg/h (4,000 lb/h)
Takeoff (MTOW)	1,885 m (6,184 ft)	1,900 m (6,200 ft)

== See also ==
Related development

- Antonov An-71
- Antonov An-72
- Antonov An-74
- Antonov An-178

Aircraft of comparable role, configuration, and era

- BAe 146/Avro RJ
- Embraer E-Jet family
- Fairchild Dornier 328JET
- Fokker 70/100
- Sukhoi Superjet 100
- Tupolev Tu-334
