= Embraer C-390 Millennium =

Brazilian military transport aircraft/tanker

C-390 Millennium
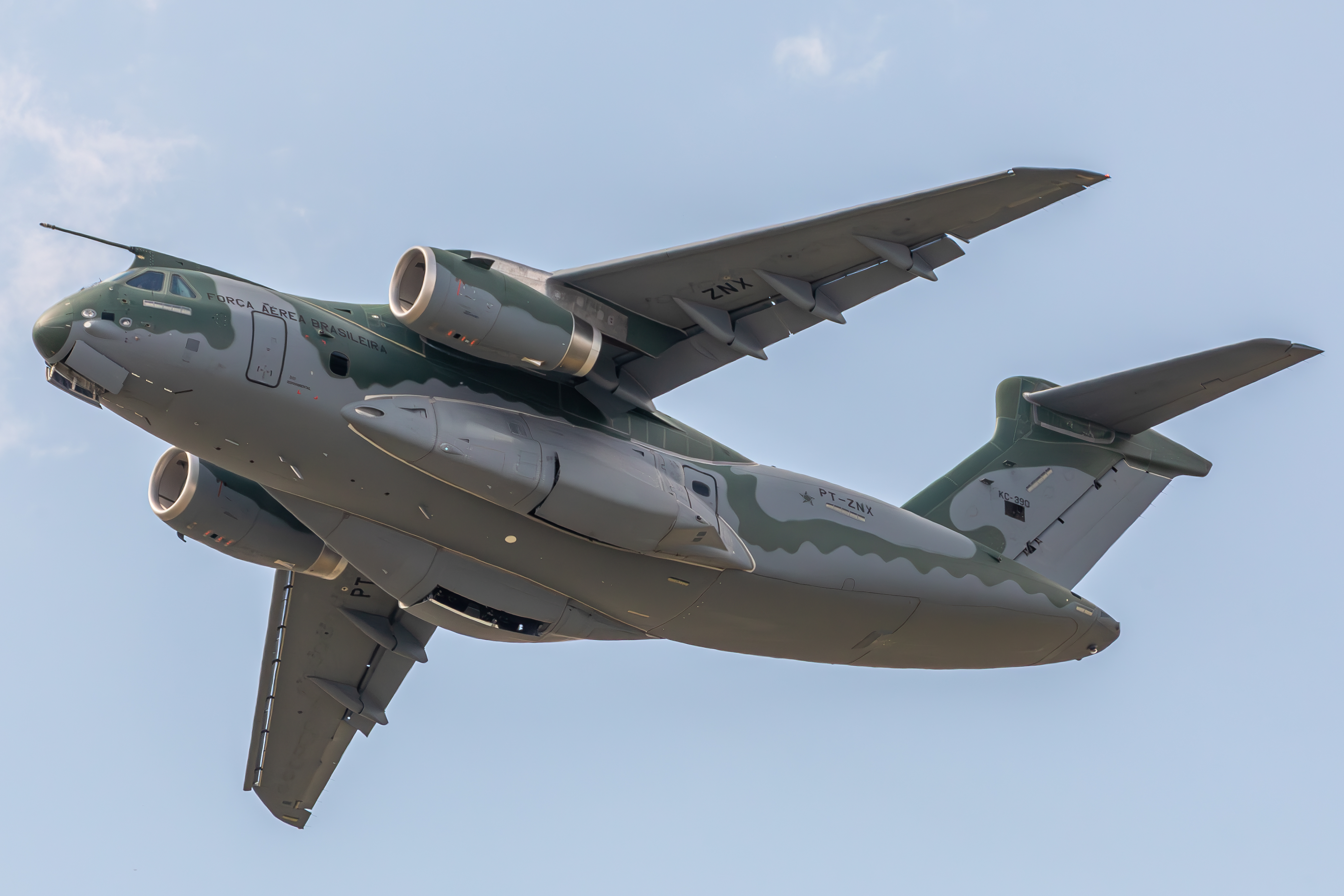
- A KC-390 flying under Brazilian Air Force colors

General information
- Type: Military transport, aerial refuelling aircraft
- National origin: Brazil
- Manufacturer: Embraer
- Status: In service
- Primary users: Brazilian Air Force Portuguese Air Force; Hungarian Air Force; Czech Air Force
- Number built: 16 (including 3 prototypes)

History
- Manufactured: 2014–present
- Introduction date: 2019
- First flight: 3 February 2015

The Embraer C-390 Millennium is a medium-size, twin-engine, jet-powered military transport aircraft designed and produced by Brazilian aerospace manufacturer Embraer. It is the heaviest aircraft the company has built to date.

Work on the project began at Embraer during the mid-2000s, with early efforts centred around a conceptual derivative of the E190 jetliner of a similar size to the Lockheed C-130 Hercules. In May 2008, the Brazilian government invested R$800 million (US$440M) in the project's development. In April 2009, Embraer received a $1.5 billion contract from the Brazilian Air Force for two prototypes. The aircraft was initially designated C-390 before changing to KC-390 in early 2011. The official designation, as certified, is EMB-390 KC. At the 2011 Paris Air Show, Embraer announced plans to launch a stretched version of the aircraft as a civilian freighter. Partnerships were promptly formed with various other aerospace companies, including FAdeA, ENAER, OGMA, and Boeing. Major subcontractors in the aircraft's manufacturing include Aero Vodochody, BAE Systems, and Rockwell Collins.

On 3 February 2015, the first of two prototypes performed its maiden flight. On 4 September 2019, the first production aircraft was delivered to the Brazilian Air Force. In November 2019, during the Dubai Airshow, Embraer announced the aircraft's new name for the global market, C-390 Millennium. Several export customers for the C-390 have been secured, including the Portuguese Air Force, Hungarian Air Force, the Royal Netherlands Air and Space Force, the Austrian Air Force, and the Swedish Air Force.

Utilizing turbofan jet engines, the C-390 can be configured to perform various conventional operations such as troop, VIP and cargo transportation, and more specialised logistical operations such as aerial refuelling as a tanker. It can carry payloads of up to 26 t (57,000 lb)—such as two fully-tracked M113 armored personnel carriers, one Boxer armoured vehicle, a Sikorsky H-60 helicopter, 74 litters with life-support equipment, up to 80 soldiers or 66 paratroopers with full gear—and loads of up to 19 t (42,000 lb) can be air dropped. Each aircraft costs around €80 million as of 2024.

== Development ==
=== Studies ===
In the early 2000s, the Brazilian aircraft manufacturer became interested in developing its own medium-sized transport aircraft. Its initial design study was based around a high-wing derivative of its existing E190 jetliner. Between 2005 and 2007, it investigated the pairing of the wing and GE CF34 engine of the mature Embraer 190 (E190) with a cabin that was modified to function as a cargo hold, complete with a rear ramp, closed-loop fly-by-wire system, and synthetic vision.

By 2006, Embraer was studying a military tactical transport design of a similar size to the Lockheed C-130 Hercules, to be powered by 75-100 kN (17,000–22,000 lbf) jet engines, such as the Pratt & Whitney PW6000 and Rolls-Royce BR715. In April 2007, Embraer publicly stated that it was studying a medium-size airlifter. Referred to by the company designation C-390, this transport aircraft was said to incorporate many of the technological solutions present on the Embraer E-Jet series and feature a rear ramp for the loading and unloading of a wide range of cargo.

In March 2008, the Brazilian government planned to invest about R$60 million (equivalent to US$33 million) in the aircraft's initial development. Simultaneously, the Brazilian Air Force was in the process of finalizing an initial purchase contract for between 22 and 30 aircraft, while Embraer was negotiating with possible partners on the programme. Two months later, the Brazilian Congress released R$800 million (US$440M) to be invested in the project and fund the aircraft's development. Around this time, the media claimed that the aircraft would be operated by the Brazilian Air Force and the Army and Navy, and that there were unconfirmed sales to other government agencies in the works.

=== Program launch ===
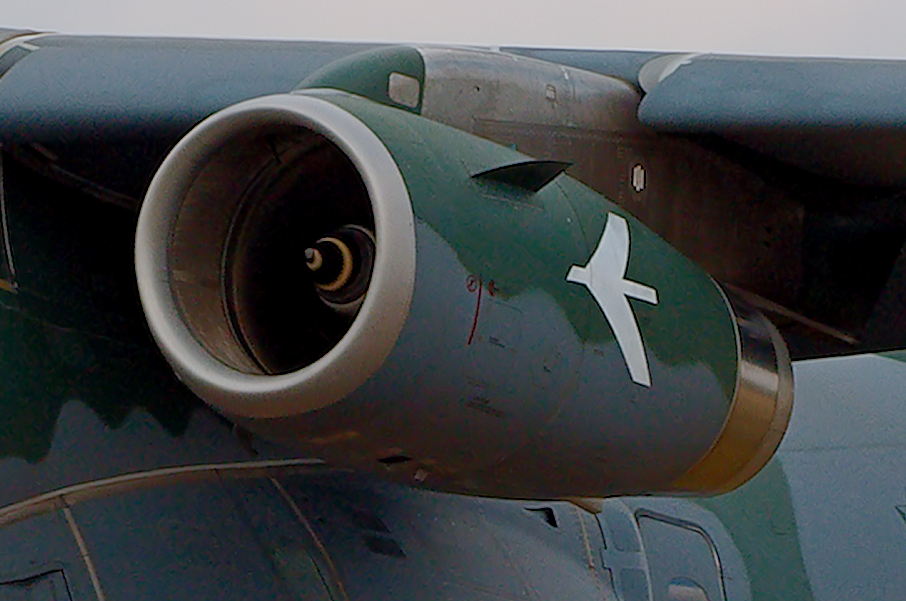
The IAE V2500 turbofan was selected to power the C-390.

On 14 April 2009, Embraer was awarded with a $1.5 billion contract to develop and build two prototypes. At the programme launch, the design was all-new in terms of its fuselage, wing, flight deck, and engine selection. The E-190's wing were dispensed with, partly due to its limited surface area. It was also stated that the aircraft would be the operational successor to the Brazilian Air Force's C-130 fleet. According to Embraer, the selected jet engine is sufficiently resilient to dust ingestion, whereas propeller tips close to the ground are susceptible to damage. Embraer also chose the IAE V2500 engine for its efficiency under normal conditions, rather than prioritising its performance under unusual conditions, such as on the Antonov An-32.

In March 2010, Embraer drew up a development schedule, upon which the first prototype aircraft was scheduled to be delivered in late 2014. In July 2010, at the Farnborough Airshow, the Brazilian Air Force announced its intent to order 28 C-390s, while Embraer announced an increase in the aircraft's cargo capacity to 21 t (46,000 lb). At the 2011 Paris Air Show, Embraer announced plans to launch a stretched version of the C-390 focused on the civil market for freighters sometime around 2018. It estimated that the company would receive 200–250 orders over a 10-year period. To increase internal capacity, two plugs will be added fore and aft of the centre fuselage section, which would also provide a new side cargo door.

In April 2011, Embraer estimated that 695 military transport aircraft worldwide would need to be replaced in the following decade.

=== Partnerships ===
In August 2010, the defence ministers of Chile and Brazil signed an agreement for the Chilean aircraft company ENAER to join the C-390 industry team. That same month, Argentine Defence Minister Nilda Garré announced that Argentina through FAdeA, would participate in the construction programme. In September 2010, Colombia signed an agreement to participate in the C-390 programme. On 10 September 2010, the defense minister of Portugal signed an intentions letter to join the programme. In December 2011, Brazil and Portugal agreed to a defense partnership with Empresa de Engenharia Aeronáutica (EEA) for developing the engineering data for the KC-390's components, which will be manufactured by Embraer's Portuguese subsidiary OGMA.

In April 2012, the American aerospace giant Boeing and Embraer signed a cooperation agreement. Two months later, an agreement was signed by the two companies to collaborate on the development of the C-390, and possibly extending to sales as well. In June 2013, Boeing agreed to market the C-390 in the US, UK, and Middle East, building on the June 2012 MoU. In November 2019, it was announced that Boeing and Embraer were to form a new joint venture company to promote and develop new markets for the C-390 Millennium. This new company, Boeing Embraer – Defense, was to have its ownership divided between a 51% stake held by Embraer and 49% by Boeing. It was to begin operations following the granting of regulatory approvals and the satisfaction of closing conditions. However, in April 2020, Boeing terminated the planned joint ventures with Embraer.

Major subcontractors include Aero Vodochody for the rear fuselage section, BAE Systems for the fly-by-wire primary flight control system, ELEB for the landing gear, OGMA, involved in the design and manufacturing of the sponsons, including the central fuselage, and development of the landing gear, rear wing elevators, fuselage and part of the rudder with CEiiA, with Rockwell Collins for the avionics, cargo handling and aerial delivery system. Fábrica Argentina de Aviones supplies the tail cone, cargo door and landing gear doors. International Aero Engines (IAE) supplies the V2500-E5 turbofans. Its use on the C-390 was its first military application.

On 25 April 2023, in a joint statement by Brazil and Portugal, it was announced that the KC-390 could be built or assembled in Portugal by OGMA for European customers along with the new A-29N.

=== Flight testing ===
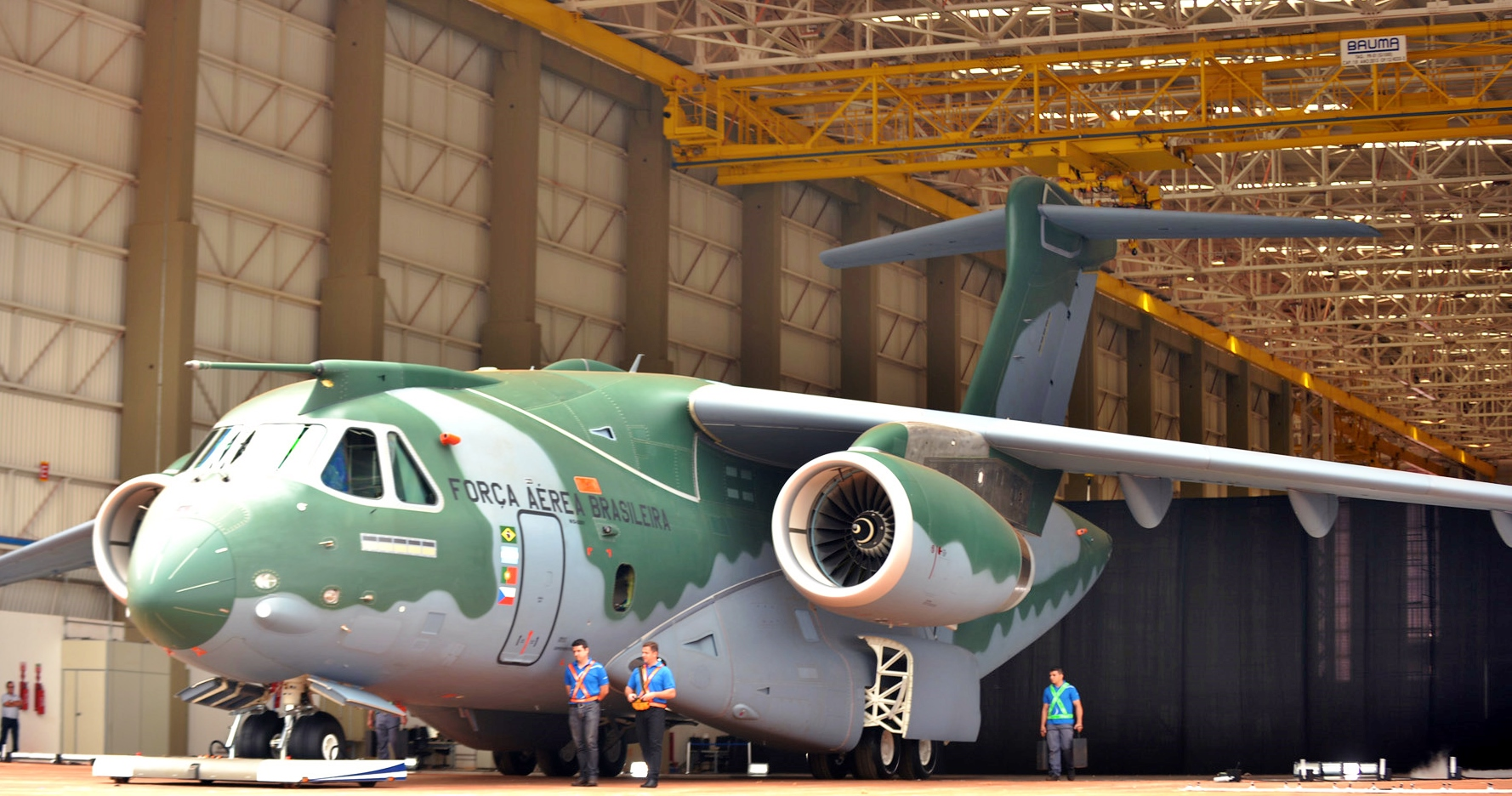
C-390 roll-out on 21 October 2014

It was decided to construct a pair of prototypes to participate in the test programme. On 21 October 2014, the first prototype (PT-ZNF) rolled out from the Embraer subsidiary plant, Embraer Defense and Security, at Gavião Peixoto, São Paulo. On 3 February 2015, the first prototype performed its maiden flight.

In July 2015, the company announced a two-year delay in the flight test program, citing the devaluation of the Brazilian currency and government spending cuts. However, a second test flight took place at Gavião Peixoto on 26 October 2015. By February 2016, the first prototype had logged more than 100 hours of flight. Following the resumption of flight-testing, the manufacturer expected to certify the C-390 sometime in 2017 and begin deliveries in 2018. The eight months between test flights were used to conduct ground vibration tests to validate aeroelastic models, as well as avionics, mission, landing gear and electric and hydraulic flight control system testing. Embraer reported good availability for testing, sometimes conducting two flights per day. The aircraft was tested to the limits of speed, Mach number, and altitude, as well as all slats, flaps and landing gear positions.

In March 2016, the second prototype (PT-ZNJ) was completed. It conducted its first flight in April 2016. By then, Richard Aboulafia's Teal Group estimated the C-390's price to be around US$50–55 million, which was US$15 million below that of the competing Hercules.

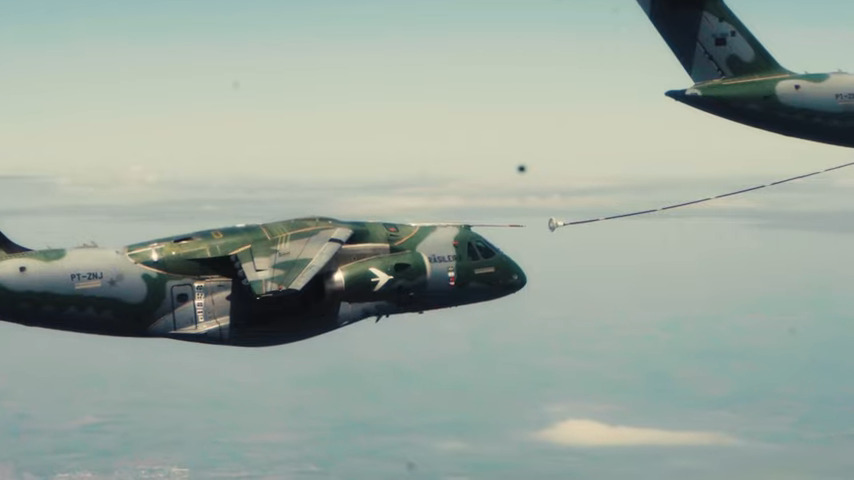
Refueling certification test

On 17 October 2017, the first prototype (PT-ZNF) made an uncommanded descent from 6,000 m to 930 ft at 1,350 m/min. In December 2017, as the two prototypes accumulated over 1,500 flight hours and laboratory testing over 40,000 hours, initial operating capability was reached, while full operational capability was expected in 2018. On 5 May 2018, the first prototype (PT-ZNF) ran off the runway during a ground test in Gaviao Peixoto, Brazil. The first production C-390, which was the third aircraft to be built including the prototypes, made its first flight on 6 October 2018.

On 23 October 2018, the C-390 was issued with Brazilian civil type certification. By this point, the aircraft has cumulatively attained 1,900 flight hours during testing, while the first production aircraft was set to be delivered to the Brazilian Air Force in the first half of 2019 and should obtain military certification by the end of 2019. The third aircraft (PT-ZNG), originally slated for the first delivery, was instead redirected towards the certification efforts.

In February 2021, Embraer and the Brazilian Air Force dispatched a single KC-390 to the US to undergo testing under extreme cold conditions.

=== Full operational capability ===
In the first quarter of 2023, the Brazilian Air Force fleet of C-390 had accumulated more than 8,000 flight hours, having participated in aviation fairs and carried out missions on all continents including Antarctica, where C-390 from the Fat Squadron (1st/1st GT) performed two air resupply missions for the Brazilian Comandante Ferraz Antarctic Station. At the end of March 2023, the aircraft received the Final Type Certificate, reaching full operational capability (FOC).

== Design ==
The Embraer C-390 Millennium is a mid-sized utility transport aircraft. Its design permits flexible operations. Both the internal and external configuration of the aircraft can be rapidly interchanged to accommodate different mission roles due the modular design adopted since the aircraft concept for all missions systems. It incorporates modern technology and mission software to aid crews in carrying out operations. The cockpit has head-up displays for the enhanced vision system with four cameras and Rockwell Collins Pro Line Fusion commercial avionics. The C-390 can provide inflight refueling to other aircraft through two wing-mounted probe and drogue pods from Cobham plc. These can deliver fuel at up to 1,500 L (400 US gal) per minute from a 35 t (77,000 lb) total fuel capacity, between 220 and 560 km/h (120 and 300 kn) and from 600 to 10,000 ft (180 to 3,050 m).

The aircraft is powered by a pair of IAE V2500-E5 turbofan engines, which are mounted forward on the high wing. This wing features an anhedral angle, slats, and High-lift devices able to deflect up to 40°. The landing gear is equipped with low-pressure tires, two 5.9 bar (85 psi) on the nose and four 7.2 bar (105 psi) on either side bogies, which facilitate the aircraft's use upon soft, unpaved ground, such as austere airstrips, or damaged runways. The C-390 has a cruising speed of Mach 0.8 which, according to Embraer, enables payloads to be transported faster than any other airplane in the medium airlift market. It can attain a controlled descend rate of 2,700 m/min (8,900 ft/min) at its 580 km/h (310 kn) maximum IAS through a combination of extended slats, idle thrust, and flight spoilers extended to 40°. When its flaps are fully deployed at 40 degrees, it has a stall speed of 104 kn (193 km/h) IAS.

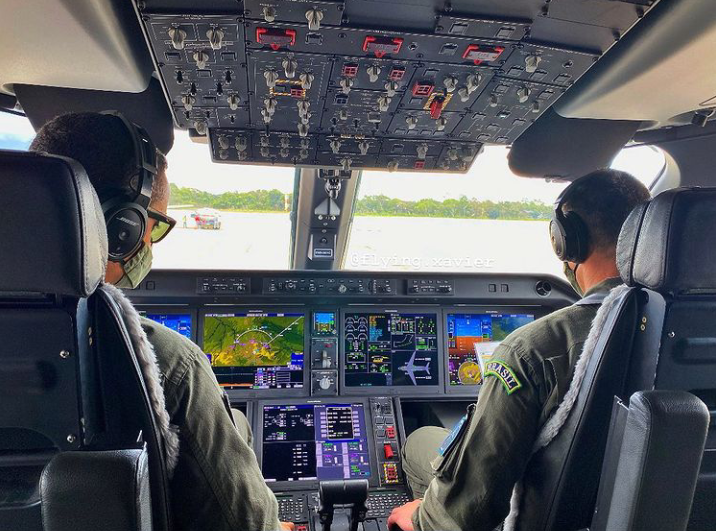
C-390 glass cockpit preparing for flight

The aircraft is equipped with fully fly-by-wire flight controls combined with active sidesticks, which reduces the crew's workload over conventional counterparts and permits load factors up to 3g. An autothrottle system is installed. The navigation systems, which were largely supplied by Thales Group, include an Inertial Navigation System (INS), GPS, and Collision Avoidance System (TCAS) transponder. It is fitted with SELEX Galileo's Gabbiano tactical radar, capable of GMTI, SAR, ISAR, SART modes amongst others. For self-defense purposes, an Elbit Systems-supplied directional infrared countermeasures suite is typically installed. An integrated onboard maintenance system actively monitors the health of the overall aircraft and various subsystems at all times.

The hold of the C-390 has a length of 18.5 m (61 ft), width of 3.45 m (11.3 ft), and height of 2.95 m (9 ft 8 in), and is primarily accessed via a large rear ramp built into the tail. It can carry payloads of up to 26 t (57,000 lb). This allows for the carriage of either two fully-tracked M113 armored personnel carriers, one Boxer or Brazilian VBTP-MR Guarani wheeled armoured vehicle, a Sikorsky H-60 helicopter, 74 litters with life-support equipment, up to 80 soldiers or 66 paratroopers with full gear. Loads of up to 19 t (42,000 lb) can be air dropped. A cargo handling and aerial delivery system, produced by DRS Defense Solutions, is incorporated. Typical amenities present in the hold include a galley, an accessibility-friendly toilet, automatic temperature control, and noise/vibration mitigation measures. Embraer have stated that considerable attention was paid to passenger comfort.

== Variants ==
- EMB-390 KC: Official model designation, as certified. C-390 and KC-390 are marketing designations.
- C-390: standard model of the aircraft for transport, SAR and aerial firefighting operations
- KC-390: aerial refueling variant, developed for the Brazilian Air Force
- C-390 IVR: anti-submarine and maritime patrol variant announced in December 2024, under studies for a joint development between Embraer and the Brazilian Air Force to replace the aging Brazilian Lockheed P-3AM Orion fleet.

== Operational history ==
=== Brazil ===
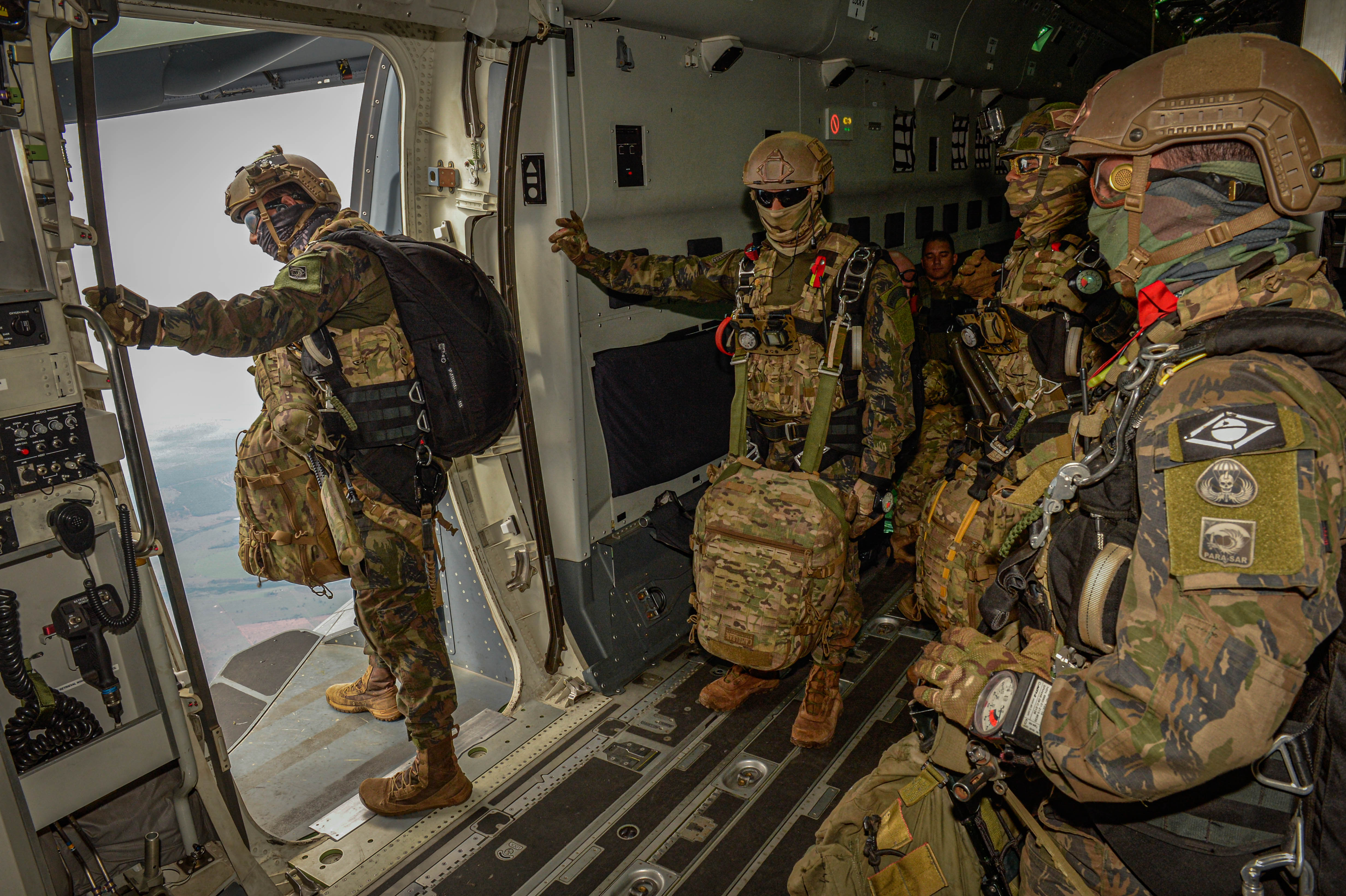
Brazilian Para-SAR Special Forces in operational free-jump training on a C-390

In 2014, the Brazilian government ordered 28 C-390s. There was the stated intention of progressively replacing the Brazilian Air Force's existing cargo aircraft fleet with the type, including its C-130s. The first C-390 was delivered to the Brazilian Air Force on 4 September 2019. The fleet of C-390s will be operated from Anápolis Air Force Base by the 1st Troop Transportation Group (1º GTT) Zeus and in Rio de Janeiro by the 1st/1st GT Gordo.

In the first 3.5 years of operation, the C-390 in the FAB totaled more than 8,200 flight hours with 6,000 flights, the technical availability was around 80% and the mission completion rate was 99.5%, according to Embraer data and the FAB.

In January 2021, in the middle of the second wave of the COVID-19 pandemic, the Brazilian city of Manaus, located in the interior of the Amazon rainforest, was left with an overburdened medical service needing medical supplies and help with transferring patients. A major operation was set up by the Brazilian air force, mobilizing all its available transport aviation. The C-390 played a key role in this operation, carrying out an airlift mission connecting the city of Manaus to the rest of the country, taking hospital supplies and removing hundreds of patients from an overloaded Manaus.

Following the 2020 Beirut explosion, a C-390 and an Embraer 190 VC-2 were sent with around six tons of medicines, food and health equipment to provide emergency care. It was the first international mission of the aircraft in FAB service.

In February 2021, during Operational Exercise "Culminating", in Louisiana, United States, the KC-390 conducted joint flights with US Air Force C-17 and C-130 airlifters. The combined force launched 4,000 paratroopers in a single night jump. In 2021, after the Haiti earthquake, the C-390 was dispatched to Haiti with around eleven tons of medicine and specialized firefighting equipment for search and rescue in collapsed structures, search dogs and doctors.

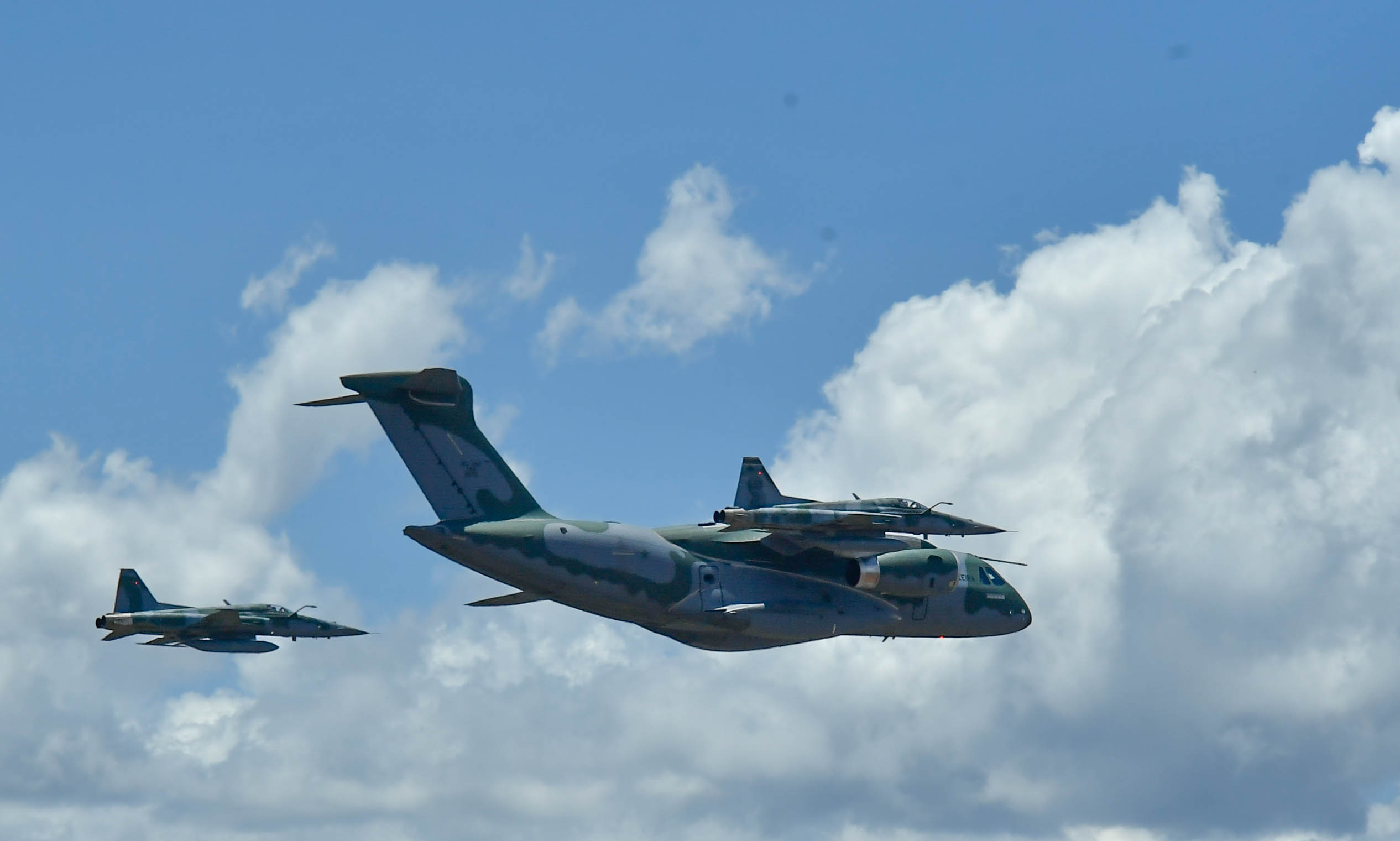
Arrival of Brazilians and foreigners from Ukraine during the Operation Repatriation, March 2022

A single C-390 flew to Ushuaia carrying spare parts in support of a FAB C-130 that was on an Antarctic operation. In the 2022 Russian invasion of Ukraine, a KC-390 and a VC-99B Legacy were sent with a mission to rescue Brazilian nationals and other countries. The mission also brought around 12 tons of humanitarian aid to Ukraine. The mission rescued national, Ukrainian, Argentine and Colombian citizens, all of whom were taken to Brazil.

In February 2022, the Brazilian government and Embraer agreed to downsize the former's order for C-390s to 22, which was a reduction from the original order for 28 aircraft. This measure, which was taken as a financial austerity measure due to COVID-19, was less severe than early suggestions for as few as 15. At this point, four C-390s were in FAB service.

As of June 2022, a C-390 from the Fat Squadron (1st/1st GT) of the FAB participated for the first time in the Brazilian Antarctic Campaign, dropping supply loads for the Comandante Ferraz Antarctic Station. The C-390 participated in 2022 in Operation Cooperation VII in Colombia, operating on runways of up to 2,100 meters, at altitudes simulating missions of humanitarian assistance and paratrooper launches.

In 2023, aircraft participated in Operation Surucucu delivering supplies by air to the indigenous Yanomami peoples who live between the Orinoco and Amazon rivers. In 2023, they also participated in the Salitre IV exercise, in Chile, where a KC-390 and six F-5s carried out 50 combat missions with the tanker aircraft performing the first combat refueling in an international mission.

In December 2024, Embraer and the Brazilian Air Force (FAB) signed an agreement at Mostra BID, the National Defense and Security Fair in Brasilia, to deepen collaborative studies aimed at expanding the capabilities of the C-390 Millennium for Intelligence, Surveillance and Reconnaissance (ISR) missions, with a focus on Maritime Patrol.

=== Portugal ===
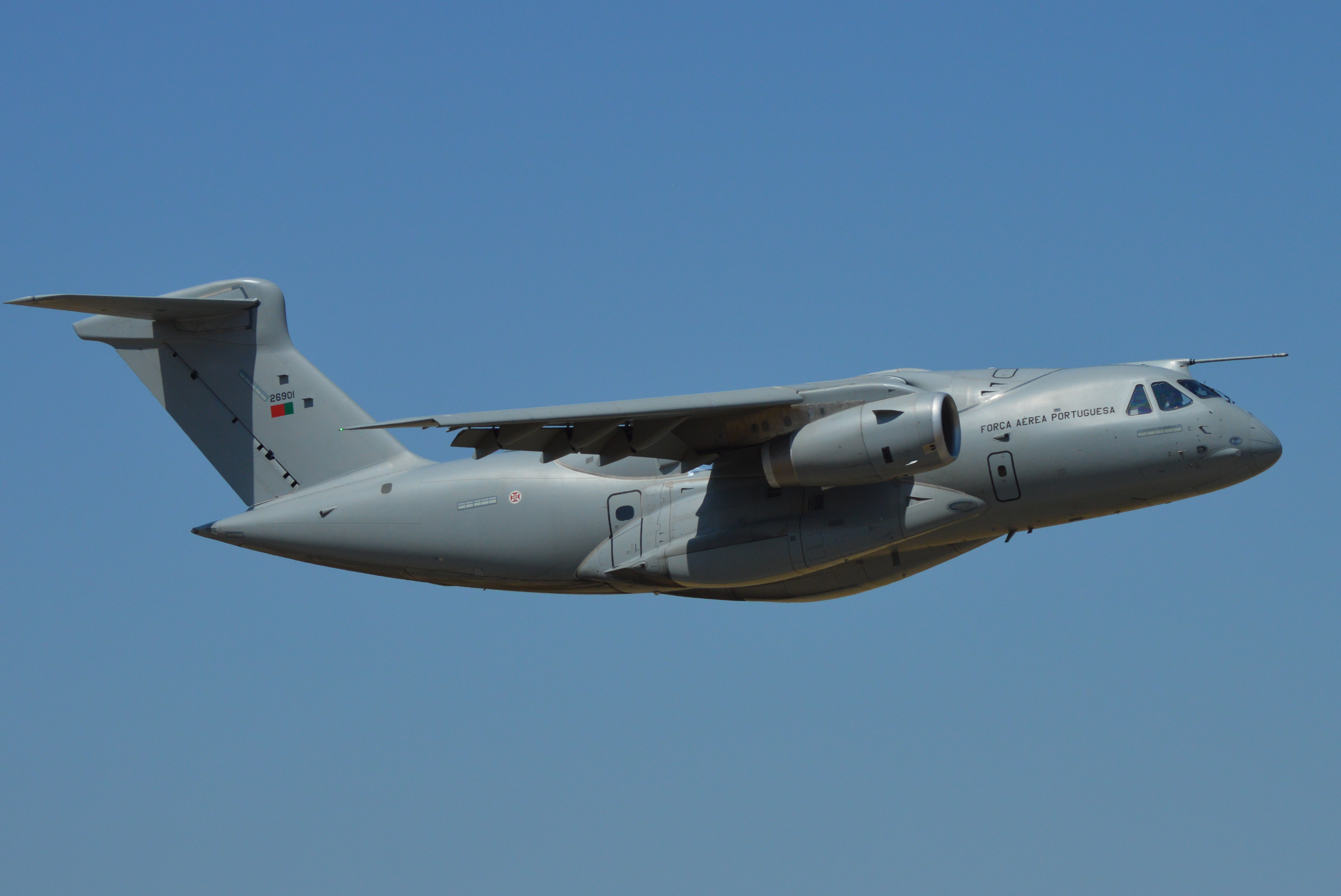
A Portuguese Air Force C-390

Among its first missions in the Portuguese Air Force in October 2023, the C-390 transported military personnel and cargo to the Canary Islands, Spain, in support of the multinational Spanish-led exercise Ocean Sky 2023. It then progressed to the United States where it picked up one of the Black Hawk helicopters procured by Portugal. On its return flight, it crossed the Atlantic Ocean on a direct flight from Providence, Rhode Island to Ovar.

== Marketing and potential orders ==
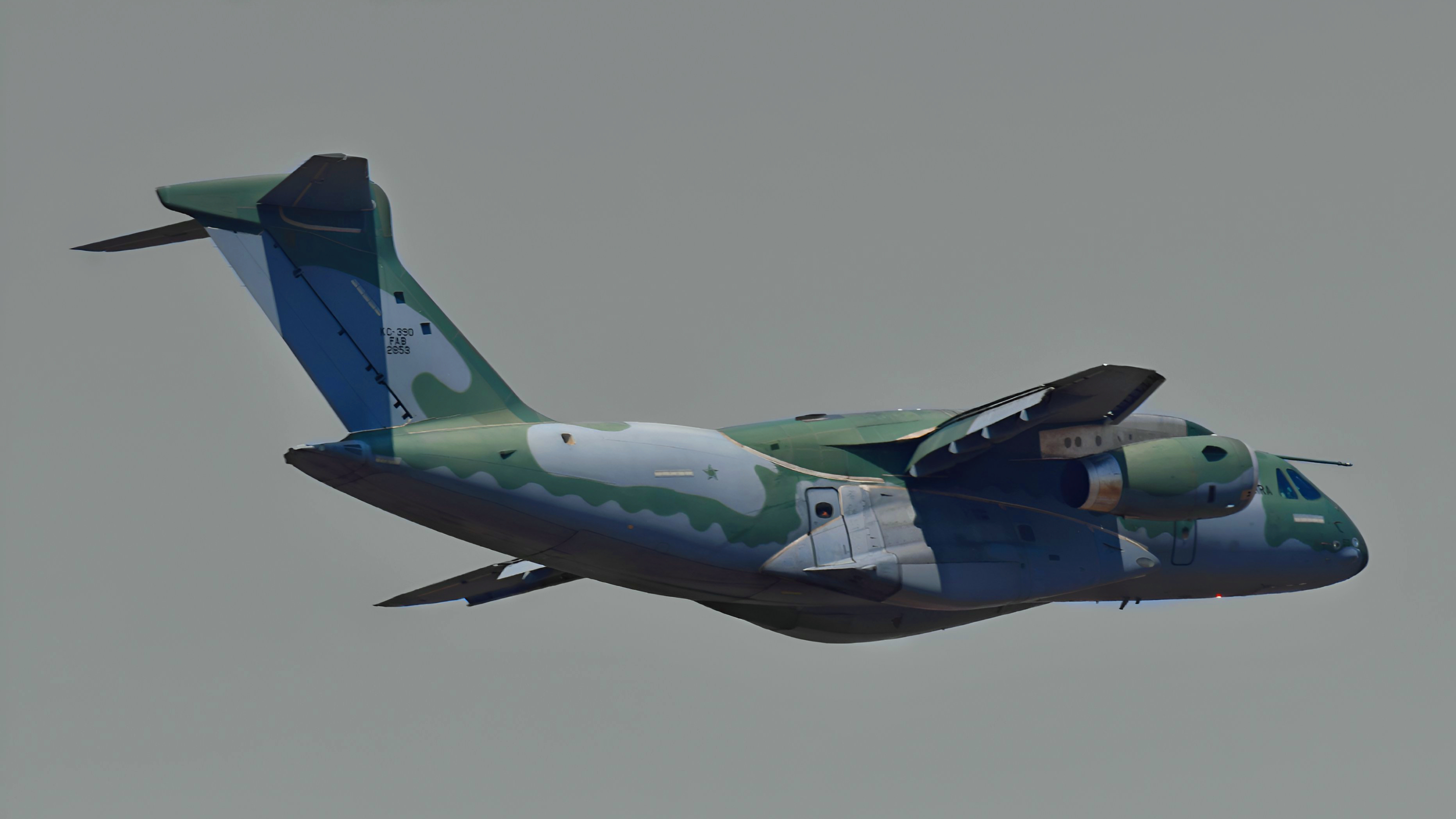
Embraer C-390 Millennium at Aero India 2023

The C-390 has been marketed as a jet-powered alternative to the Lockheed C-130. In May 2023, the commander of the Brazilian Air Force, Brigadier Marcelo Kanitz Damasceno, pointed to Austria, the Czech Republic, Egypt, India, Rwanda, South Africa, South Korea, and Sweden as potential buyers for the KC-390.

- Angola: The National Air Force of Angola mentioned ordering four C-390s to replace its Antonov An-12 and other transport aircraft during a visit of the Brazilian president Lula in August 2023.
- Egypt: Following collaboration agreements between Embraer and Egypt, there is a hope for a purchase of the C-390 for the Egyptian Air Force.
- Finland: In April 2025 it was announced by Embraer that the Finnish Air Force was interested in the C-390 to supplement existing Tactical Transport Aircraft.
- India
  - February 2024: Embraer signed an initial agreement with Mahindra Group (parent company of Mahindra Aerostructures) with the intention of working together to offer C-390 Millennium aircraft to the Indian Air Force in its upcoming Medium Transport Aircraft procurement project.
  - September 2024: Embraer further placed an official proposal to establish an assembly line in India.
  - 17 October 2025: Embraer and Mahindra signed a strategic cooperation agreement to advance the C-390 for the MTA programme. Simultaneously, Embraer inaugurated its national office in Aerocity, New Delhi.
  - 20 February 2026: They announced their plans to advance location selection to establish an MRO base in India subject to IAF's selection of C-390.
  - 1 October 2026: Embraer and Mahindra Group identified Nagpur, Maharashtra, as the location for a potential final assembly line for C-390 in India if the aircraft is selected by IAF under MTA tender. The proposed facility would support aircraft assembly, system integration, manufacturing engineering and local supply-chain development. The partnership also plans to progressively integrate Indian aerospace companies into the C-390 ecosystem for manufacturing, aftermarket services, training and lifecycle support.
- Lithuania: The Lithuanian Air Force have started negotiations to purchase and add C-390s to its fleet. As of January 2026, the order was delayed for beyond 2030.
- Morocco: Morocco has received one KC-390 Millennium for testing purposes, pending a potential acquisition agreement between Morocco and Brazil. In late 2024, Morocco announced it had selected the C-390 to replace its C-130 fleet.
- Poland: In September 2025, Embraer offered the KC-390 to the Polish Air Force to fulfil its transport and tanker needs. Embraer suggested 20 airframes could be sold to Poland, with localized production included in the offer.
- Rwanda: The Rwandan Air Force is cited as a potential client for two C-390s.
- Saudi Arabia: In November 2023, it was reported that Embraer and Saudi Arabia's SAMI have partnered to pitch the C-390 transport to the Saudi Arabian government, including the potential for local assembly and support.
- Slovakia: The Slovak Air Force selected the C-390 in December 2024. Negotiations for the purchase of three aircraft are to begin.
- South Africa: The South African Air Force is in discussion for six C-390s as of September 2023.
- United States: Embraer partnered with L3Harris to market the KC-390 to the United States Air Force (USAF) in 2022, but the partnership fell apart in late 2024. Embraer has stated it still intends to market the KC-390 to the United States, specifically as a contender in the Next Generation Air Refueling System (NGAS). In 2025, L3Harris stated that they maintained a relationship with Embraer regarding Embraer's "Agile Tanker" concept of the KC-390. Embraer is developing a boom refueling system for the KC-390 to tailor to the USAF's need, and asserts that with local assembly, around 70% of the aircraft would be made of American-sourced components, and would abide by the Buy American Act. In 2024, a Brazilian Air Force KC-390 participated in Exercise Storm Flag, demonstrating austere takoff capabilities to the USAF. In June 2025, Embraer announced it was in talks with Northrop Grumman to pitch the C-390 to the USAF. The Brazilian Air Force sent a KC-390 on tour to the United States in late April and early May 2025 to showcase its capabilities. Under a memorandum of understanding, Northrop will explore options to develop an autonomous boom refueling system for Embraer’s KC-390, hoping to attract US and international customers.
- Turkey: In April 4, 2025, it was confirmed by the Brazilian Minister of Defense that negotiations with Turkey were open for the potential acquisition of the C-390.

BAE Systems signed an agreement with Embraer to market the C-390 to Kuwait, Qatar, Oman and United Arab Emirates.

In April 2024, Embraer and Brazilian postal company Correios signed a Memorandum of Understanding focusing on air cargo transport. The partnership includes a plan to evaluate the C-390 as a civilian cargo aircraft for Correios.

== Operators ==
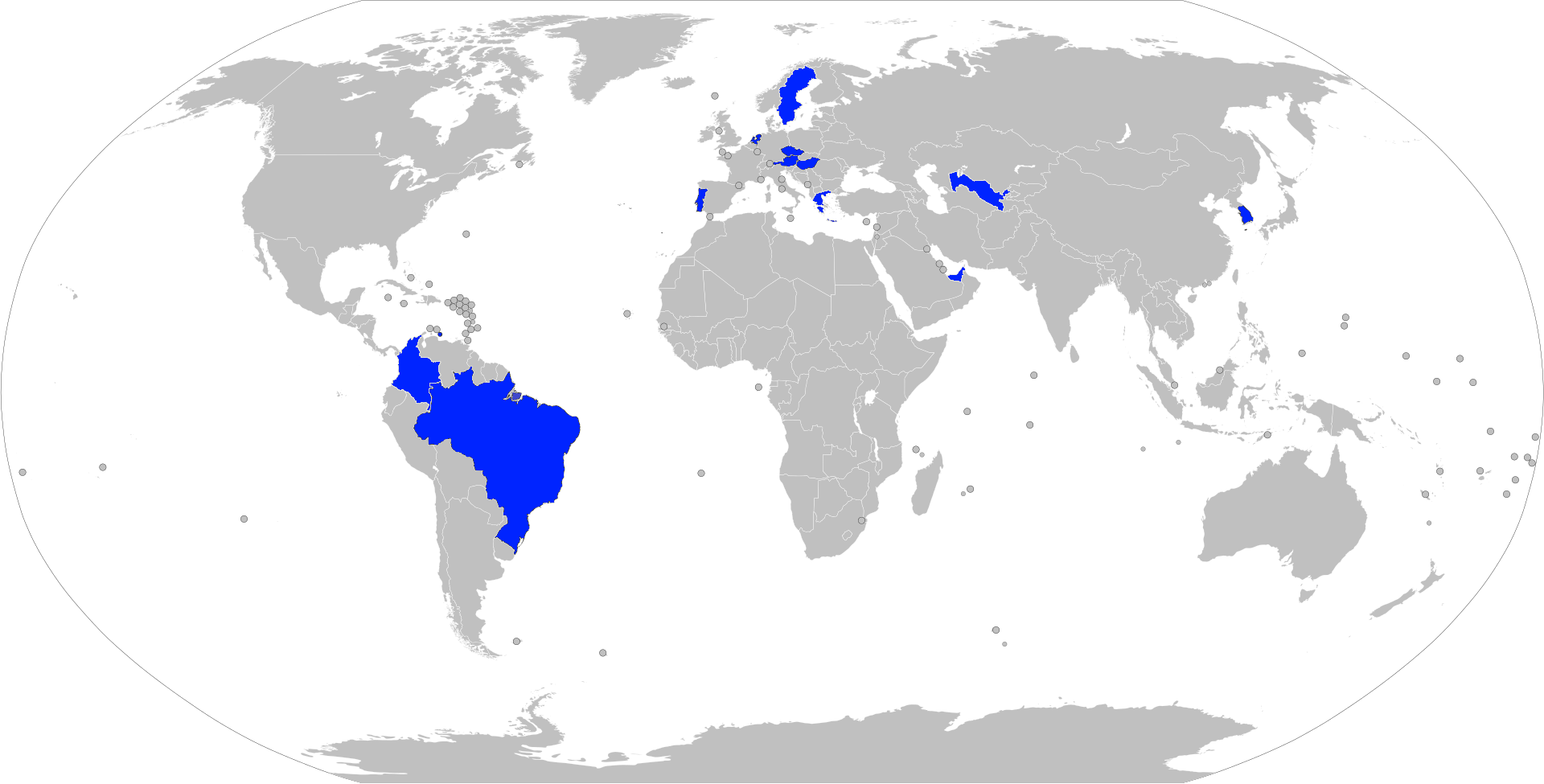
C-390 orders as of August 2026

=== Current operators ===
Brazil
Brazilian Air Force – nineteen C-390s ordered, with eight delivered as of October 2025.

1st Troop Transportation Group Zeus
1st Squadron of the 1st Transportation Group (1°/1°GT) Gordo

Hungary
Hungarian Air Force – two C-390s ordered in 2020, delivered the first on 19 October 2023, the second on 26 June 2024 and the third in November 2025. These aircraft are to be flown by Airlift Squadron "Teve" at Kecskemét Airbase. The configurations that the Hungarian Defence Forces ordered include the Intensive Care Unit (ICU) kit, enabling Hungary to provide intensive care medicine in humanitarian missions abroad.
Portugal
Portuguese Air Force – six C-390s ordered with four delivered as of July 2026.

506 Squadron "Rinocerontes" Beja Airbase

Czech Republic
Czech Air Force – two C-390s selected in October 2023 for its future aerial refueling and fixed-wing medium-lift transport requirements. Contract signed on 25 October 2024, with first aircraft delayed to be delivered in 2026, and second in 2027 or 2028. First one delivered in June 2026.
Uzbekistan
Uzbekistan Air Force – undisclosed customer for the C-390 unveiled in February 2026. The first delivery took place in September 2026.

=== Future operators ===
Austria
Austrian Air Force – four C-390s ordered in 2023 to replace its aging C-130Ks, with deliveries expected to begin in 2026.
Colombia
Colombian Aerospace Force – On 30 March 2026, Colombian President Gustavo Petro ordered the purchase for two C-390 aircraft to replace two C-130H aircraft which were out of service. Petro also named the C-390, along with Airbus A400 Atlas and the Lockheed Martin C-130J Super Hercules, as contenders to replace the entirety of the C-130H Hercules fleet. In August 2026, the order for two KC-390s was confirmed with orders expected between 2029 and 2030.
Greece
Hellenic Air Force – three C-390s ordered in 2026, through a bilateral agreement with Portugal with option for another 3. Greece is to receive the first C-390 in 2027. These aircraft are to operate as mobile hospitals, personnel carriers, and tanker aircraft. This is the first time Greece has acquired aerial refuelling aircraft.
Netherlands
Royal Netherlands Air and Space Force – selected the C-390 in 2022 with five airlifters ordered to replace its C-130H. Contract signed in July 2024 with deliveries to begin at the end of 2027. During the 2025 Paris Air Show, it was announced that the Netherlands ordered one aeromedical module unit, a self-contained, air-transportable and fully compatible with the C-390 cargo handling system roll-on/roll-off system. It will enhance the Netherlands' (and its partners Austria and Sweden) ability to conduct humanitarian, disaster relief and military medical operations abroad. The contract allows for potentially seven more of these modules for the three C-390 partners.
South Korea
Republic of Korea Air Force – three C-390s ordered in 2023, to be introduced by 2026.
Sweden
Swedish Air Force – selected in November 2024, four units ordered. The order is part of a trilateral agreement between Sweden, Austria and the Netherlands, including an option for seven additional aircraft.
United Arab Emirates
UAE Air Force – on 4 May 2026, a contract was signed for 10 aircraft with an option for up to 10 additional aircraft.

== Specifications (C-390 Millennium) ==
KC-390 3-view line drawing

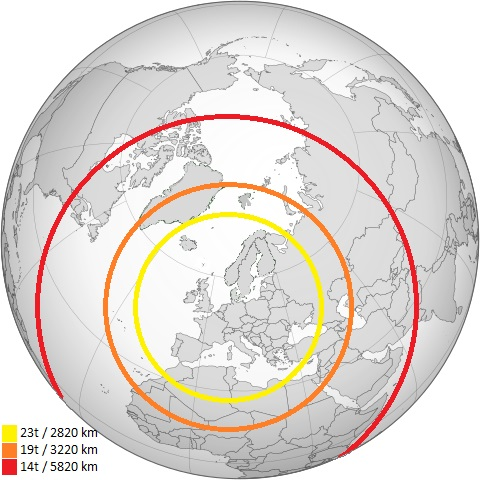
The approximate operating radius with different load weights

Data from Aviation Week, Embraer

General characteristics

- Crew: 3 (two pilots, one loadmaster)
- Capacity: 26,000 kg (57,000 lb) / 80 troops / 74 stretchers and 8 attendants / 66 paratroopers / 7 463L master pallets / 6 463L master pallets and 36 troops
- Length: 35.2 m (115 ft 6 in)
- Wingspan: 35.05 m (115 ft 0 in)
- Height: 11.84 m (38 ft 10 in)
- Empty weight: 35,000 kg (77,162 lb)
- Max takeoff weight: 86,999 kg (191,800 lb)
- Fuel capacity: 23,000 to 35,000 kg (50,700 to 77,160 lb) with 3 aux. fuel tanks
- Useful lift: 26,000 kg (57,320 lb)
- Cargo hold length × height × width: 18.5 m × 3.0 m × 3.4 m (60.6 ft × 9.8 ft × 11.3 ft)
- Powerplant: 2 × IAE V2500-E5 turbofan, 139.4 kN (31,330 lbf) thrust each

Performance

- Maximum speed: 988 km/h (614 mph, 533 kn) Mach 0.93
- Cruise speed: 870 km/h (540 mph, 470 kn) Mach 0.8
- Stall speed: 193 km/h (120 mph, 104 kn) IAS
- Range: 5,020 km (3,120 mi, 2,710 nmi) ; with 14,000 kg (31,000 lb) payload
  - 2,720 km; 1,690 mi (1,470 nmi) with 23,000 kg (51,000 lb) payload
  - 2,000 km; 1,240 mi (1,080 nmi) with 26,000 kg (57,000 lb) payload
- Ferry range: 6,240 km (3,880 mi, 3,370 nmi) – 8,460 km; 5,260 mi (4,570 nmi) max. with aux. fuel tanks
- Service ceiling: 11,000 m (36,000 ft)

Armament

- Hardpoints: 3 with a capacity of POD Optical / IR Rafael Litening II / IFR Cobham 900E

Avionics

- Rockwell Collins Pro Line Fusion

=== Systems and equipment ===
- RWR / chaff & flare (self-defense systems)
- DIRCM – Directional Infrared Countermeasures (self-defense systems)
- In-flight refueling system
- Dual HUD system
- Cabin lighting compatible with night vision systems
- CCDP – Continuously Computed Drop Point, an automated, accurate drop point calculation system
- CDS – Container Delivery System
- LVAD – Low Velocity Airdrop Delivery
- EEPGS – Emergency Electric Power Generator System (type Ram Air Turbine or RAT)

== See also ==
Related development

- Embraer E-Jet family
- Embraer E-Jet E2 family

Aircraft of comparable role, configuration, and era

- Airbus C295
- Airbus A400M Atlas
- Antonov An-178
- Shaanxi Y-9
- Ilyushin Il-276
- Kawasaki C-2
- Lockheed Martin C-130J Super Hercules

Related lists

- List of tanker aircraft
