= Air Ocean Airlines =

Ukrainian domestic airline

IATA	ICAO	Call sign
-	AOA	-
- Founded: 16 September 2020
- Commenced operations: 30 October 2021
- Ceased operations: 15 January 2022
- Hubs: Kyiv International Airport (Zhuliany)
- Fleet size: 2
- Destinations: 5
- Headquarters: Kyiv, Ukraine
- Website: airocean.com.ua

Air Ocean Airlines was a Ukrainian scheduled domestic airline based at Kyiv-Zhuliany.

== History ==
The airline was established in September 2020. The maiden flight was performed on 30 October 2021.

On 15 January 2022, the airline suspended all flights with a planned resumption on 15 March 2022. However, at the same time the Ukrainian authorities suspended the airline's operational license until further notice. Given the invasion that started on 24 February, the future of the airline is extremely uncertain.

== Destinations ==
As of January 2022, Air Ocean Airlines operated flights to the following destinations:

Ukraine

- Kharkiv - Kharkiv International Airport
- Kyiv - Kyiv International Airport (Zhuliany)
- Lviv - Lviv Danylo Halytskyi International Airport
- Zaporizhzhia - Zaporizhzhia International Airport

== Fleet ==
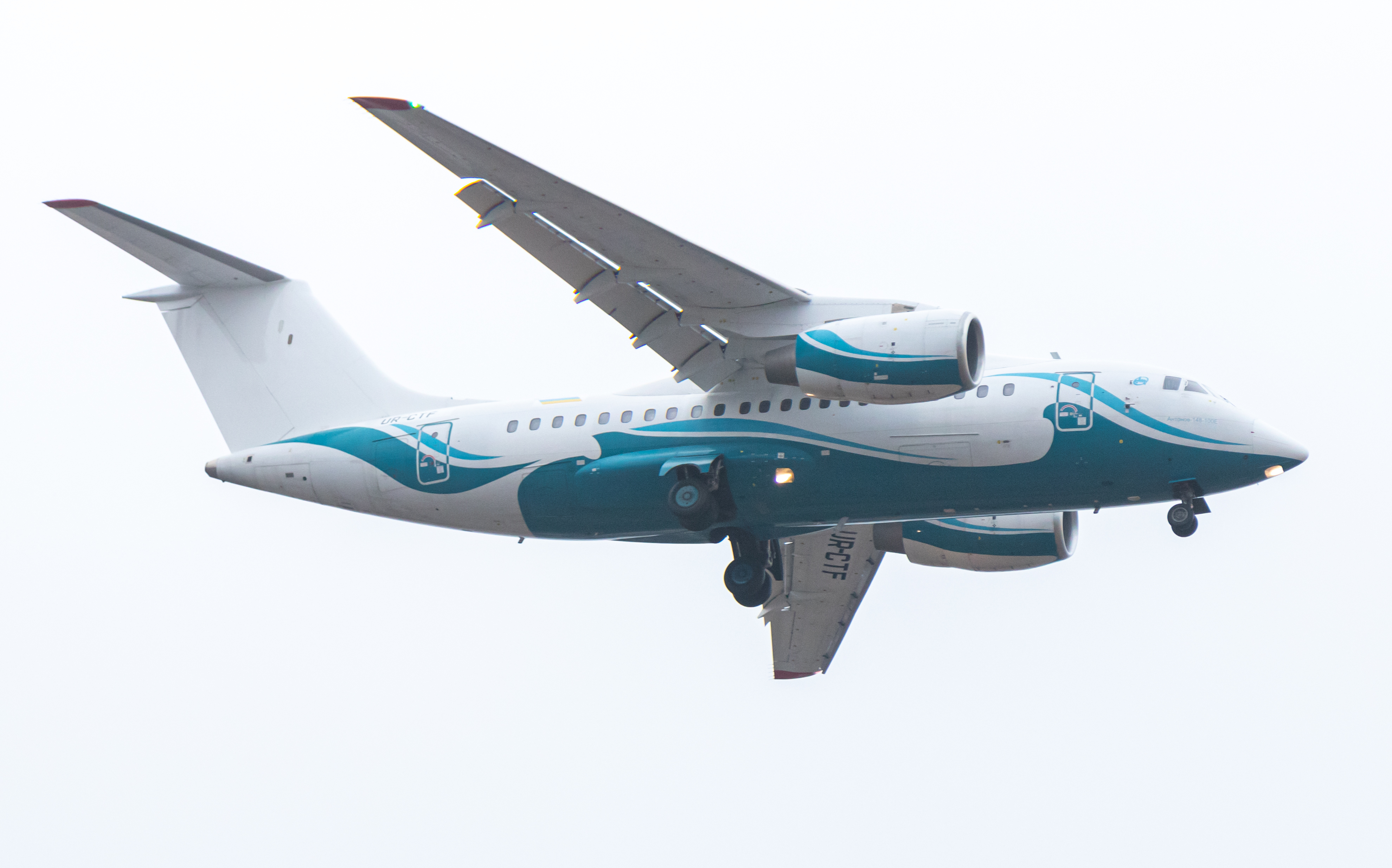
Air Ocean Airlines Antonov An-148

As of November 2021, Air Ocean Airlines operated the following aircraft:

Air Ocean Airlines Fleet
Aircraft	In service	Orders	Passengers	Notes
Antonov An-148	2	1	75	
Total	2	1		

== See also ==
- List of airlines of Ukraine
