= Antonov An-178 =

Military transport aircraft by Antonov

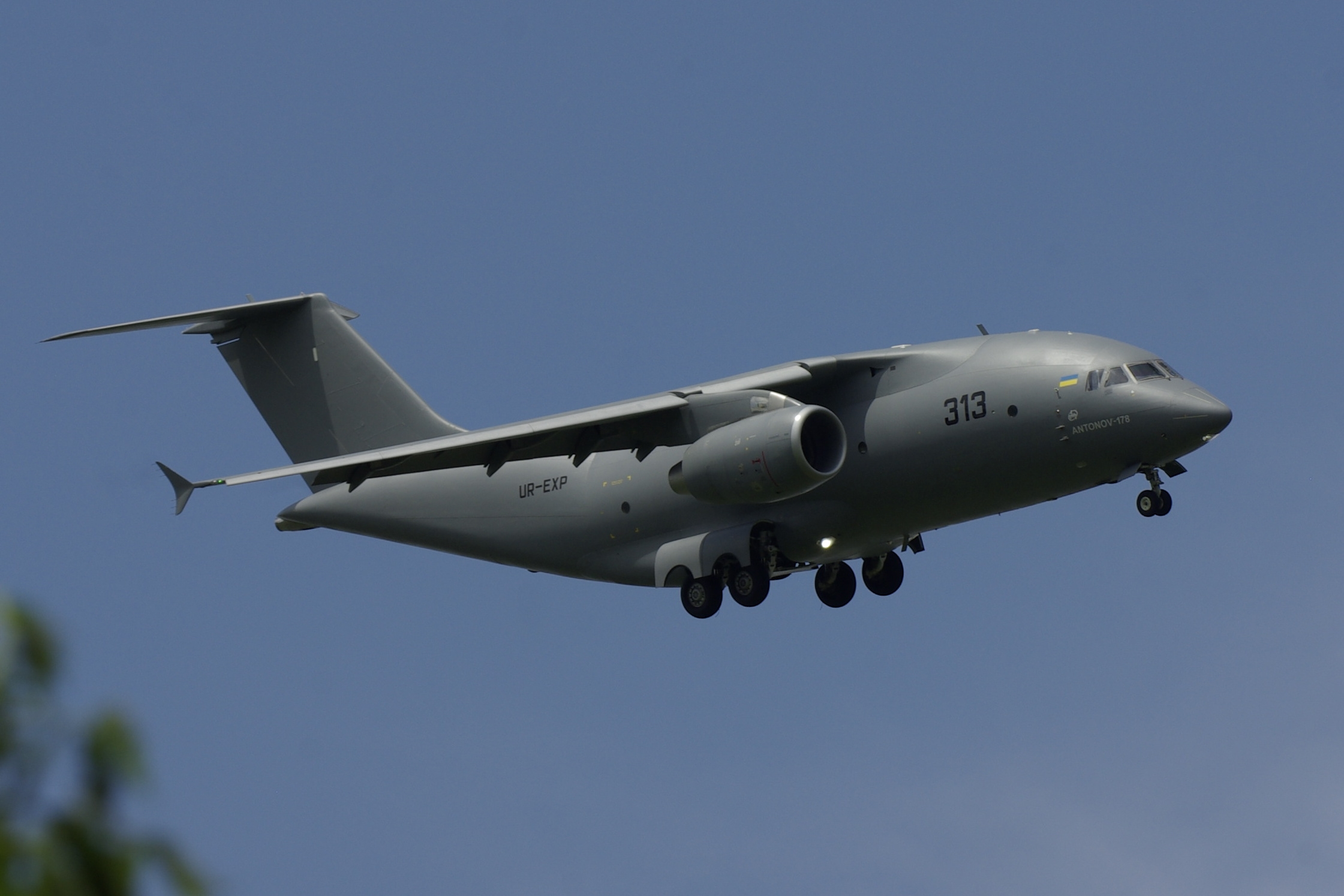

General information
- Type: Military transport aircraft
- National origin: Ukraine
- Designer: Antonov
- Built by: Antonov Serial Production Plant
- Status: In development
- Number built: 1 as of 2020

History
- First flight: 7 May 2015
- Developed from: Antonov An-158

The Antonov An-178 (Ukrainian: Антонов Ан-178) is a short-range medium-airlift military transport aircraft designed and produced by the Ukrainian Antonov company. Based on the Antonov An-158 (An-148-200), the project was announced on 5 February 2010. The first prototype was rolled out on 16 April 2015 and conducted its maiden flight on 7 May 2015.

The An-178 is proposed to replace several outdated transport aircraft, such as the An-12, An-26 and An-32. The aircraft will have an avionics suite similar to the Antonov An-148, and will use Progress D-436-148FM engines. The An-178 is a potential competitor for the Embraer C-390 from Brazil. The company has planned to build more than 200 of the aircraft.

== Development ==
The An 178 project begun in 2009 as a self-financed venture of Antonov, having resolved to produce a direct successor to the company's previous generation of transport aircraft produced during the Soviet era, including the An-12, An-26 and An-32. It is aimed to be a replacement for aging international types such as the Transall C-160. To this end, the company conducted market research to identify the contemporary requirements of the international aviation market as well as the specific needs of existing clients that determined such an aircraft should have its payload capacity optimised for the carriage of between 13 and 18 tonnes. During 2011, work on the detailed design commenced; company officials decided to base the new transport aircraft on the in-production An-148 and An-158 family.

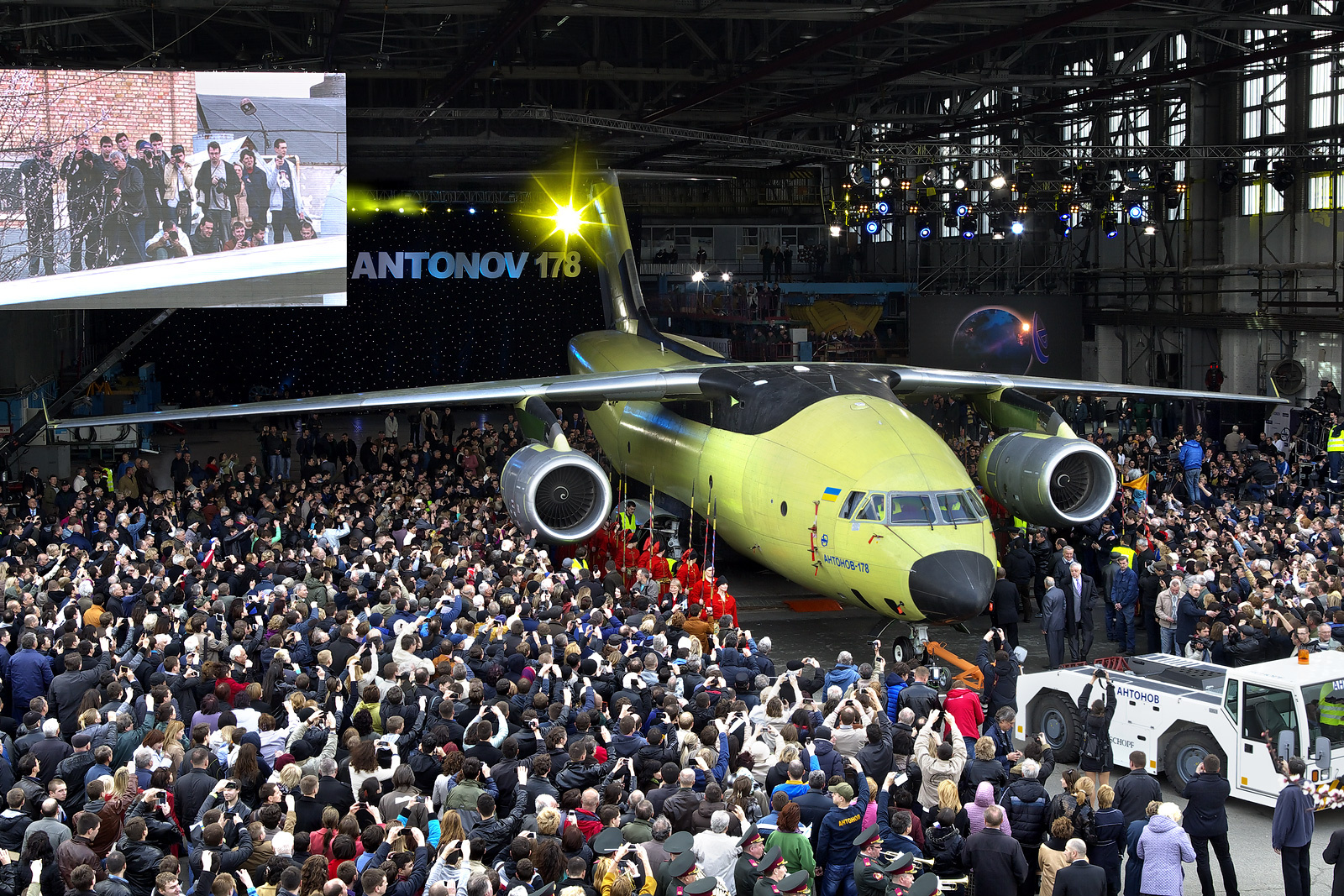
Rollout ceremony of the Antonov An-178 prototype, April 2015

In comparison to the preceding An-12, the new transport aircraft features two engines in place of four, has reduced maintenance requirements, and a smaller flight crew, all of which will lower ongoing costs to its operators. Antonov has promoted the aircraft as incorporating the latest international air freight standards and its limited reliance upon airport infrastructure while loading and unloading multi-tonne freight payloads, enabling its use from austere air strips and inhospitable terrain such as tundra and deserts. Both civilian and military applications have been foreseen for the type on the international market.

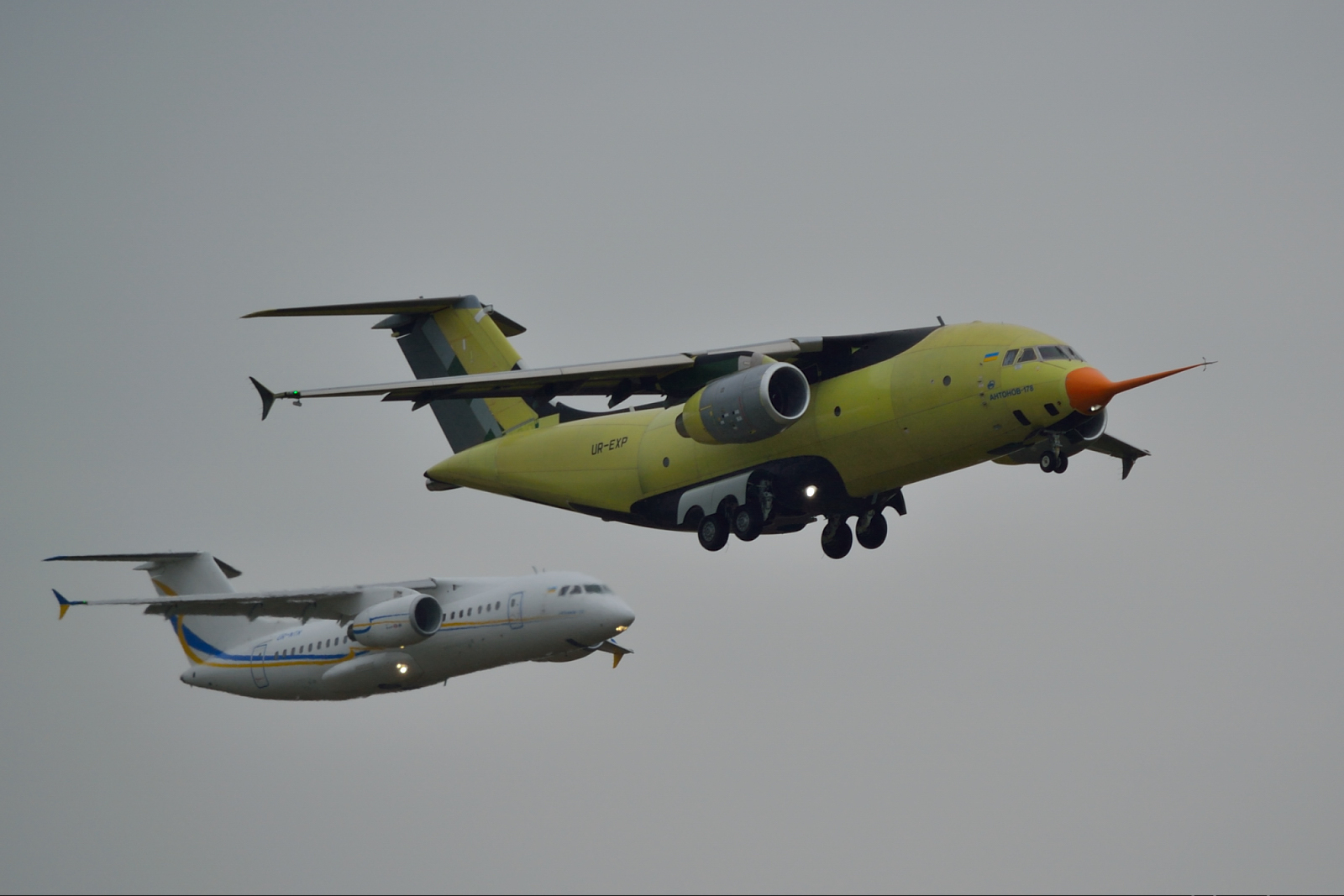
The An-178 is a derivative of the An-148/158 platform.

During the early 2010s, there were reports that future production-standard An-178s would feature an elongated wingspan while retaining the organic wing panels of the An-158. This would permit its maximal takeoff weight to be increased to an estimated 56 tons. Furthermore, later production variants would need turbofan engines with a thrust of about 9,500 kgf to have the characteristics required, such as the new-generation in-development Ivchenko-Progress AI-28 turbofan. Antonov decided to install less powerful D-436-148FM engines on the first An-178 prototype, perhaps as an interim measure. The D-436-148FM is a derivative of the production-standard D-436-148 with an upgraded fan, which boosted the takeoff thrust to 7,800 kgf; it has an emergency power rating of 8,580 kgf.

On 29 July 2014, the main fuselage of the first prototype had been completed and moved to the final assembly hall to be mated with the other airframe components. On 16 April 2015, the first prototype was rolled out at a ceremony held in Kyiv. Three weeks later, on 7 May 2015, the prototype performed its maiden flight. By this point, the programme was roughly two years behind schedule, as flight testing had been originally set to commence during 2013. By May 2017, a total of 115 test flights had been conducted, during which in excess of 194 flight hours had accumulated.

The An-178 made its Western debut at the 2015 Paris Air Show. During the event, Antonov announced that it had secured multiple orders for the first batch of production aircraft, which it claimed was already underway at its primary facility outside Kyiv. Furthermore, the company also stated that additional production agreements were being considered with both Azerbaijan and China. It was also said that customers could choose to access associated simulator training through the company. In November 2015, the An-178 also appeared at the Dubai Airshow; shortly thereafter, it was announced that the Royal Saudi Air Force - had signed a letter of intent to obtain 30 An-178; it was also stated that the resulting deal could include localised manufacturing activities in Saudi Arabia. Antonov has also discussed potential joint production arrangements with Turkey.

The domestic market has been particularly important to the programme. In June 2019, the Ministry of Internal Affairs of Ukraine placed an order for 13 An-178s; at the time, these were to be reportedly delivered within three years. During January 2021, it was announced that Antonov was embarking on the production of an initial three An-178s for the Ukrainian Air Force following the signing of a memorandum of cooperation. In May of that year, Antonov announced that fabrication of the fuselage for the Ukrainian ministry of defence's first An-178 had been completed. During December 2021, construction of the first production An-178 was declared to be complete; certification testing commenced thereafter.

== Design ==
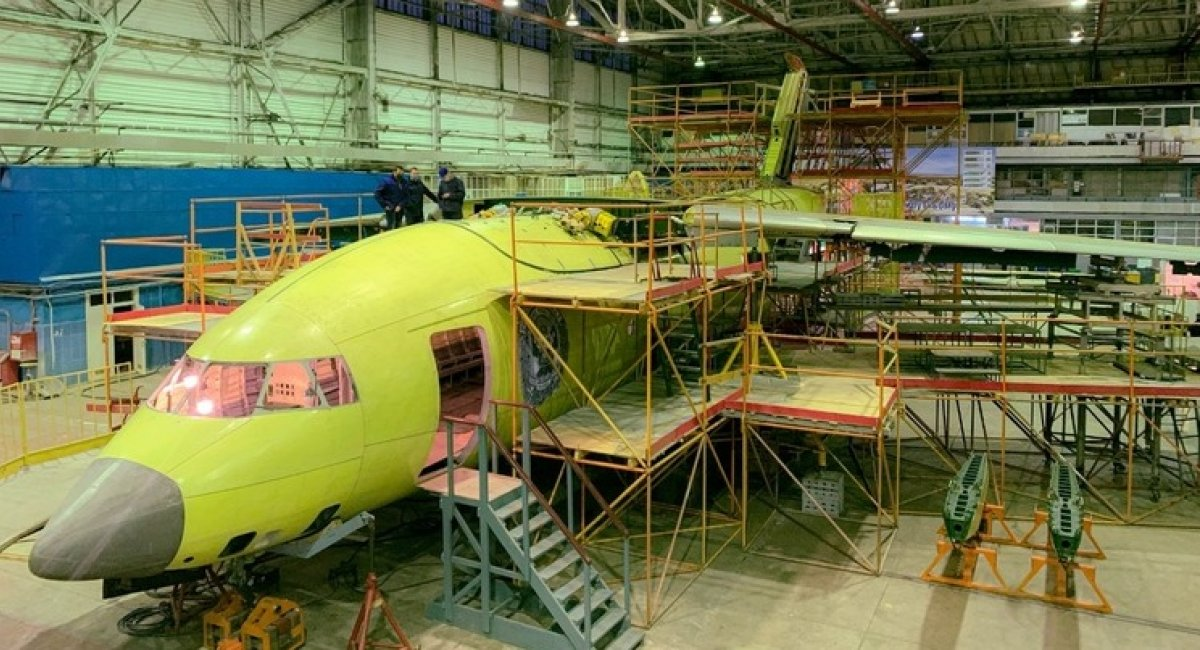
An An-178 for Ministry of the Interior of Peru under construction, November 2020

The Antonov An-178 is a high-wing transport aircraft with moderately swept wing, winglets and a T-tail. It was derived from the 99-seat An-158 regional airliner and was fitted with the commonized F1 fuselage nose section with the identical flight deck, wing panels, empennage and most of the onboard systems. The fuselage however was newly created with an enlarged diameter that had grown from 3.35 m to 3.9 m, which has resulted in an enlarged cargo hold - the cargo cabin cross section increased to 2.75 m by 2.75 m. Aside from the wing structure, outer panels (including winglets), front fuselage nose, cockpit and nose landing gear which come from the An-158, there is an extra pair of tandem main-wheels on each side.

The airframe is composed of aluminium alloys and composite materials. The fuselage is semi-monocoque with a circular cross-section. The retractable landing gear consists of two main wheel bogies and a dual nose wheel. Digital avionics are furnished. The flight control system is dual duplex fly-by-wire system, consisting of two parts: FCS-A and FCS-B, each of which is responsible for two control channels. The flight control surfaces include ailerons near the wing tips, four control spoilers, six lift-dump/speed-brake spoilers, rudder and elevators, with an emergency mechanical cable back-up system. The powerplant consists of two Progress D-436-148FM turbofan engines, mounted on pylons under the wings, and an auxiliary power unit.

The An 178 is capable of transport payloads of up to 18 tonnes over 1,000 km, or up to 10 tonnes over 4,000 km. It has a fully pressurised cargo compartment, unlike various Soviet-era transport aircraft, which eliminates various restrictions pertaining to the carriage of certain payloads, including passengers, foodstuffs, and other perishables, when flown at high altitude, expanding both the range and application of the aircraft. Potential military payloads include standardised cargo containers, a maximum of 99 infantry personnel with full combat equipment, up to 80 paratroopers, or as many as 40 casualties on litters and 30 seated casualties.

== Operators ==
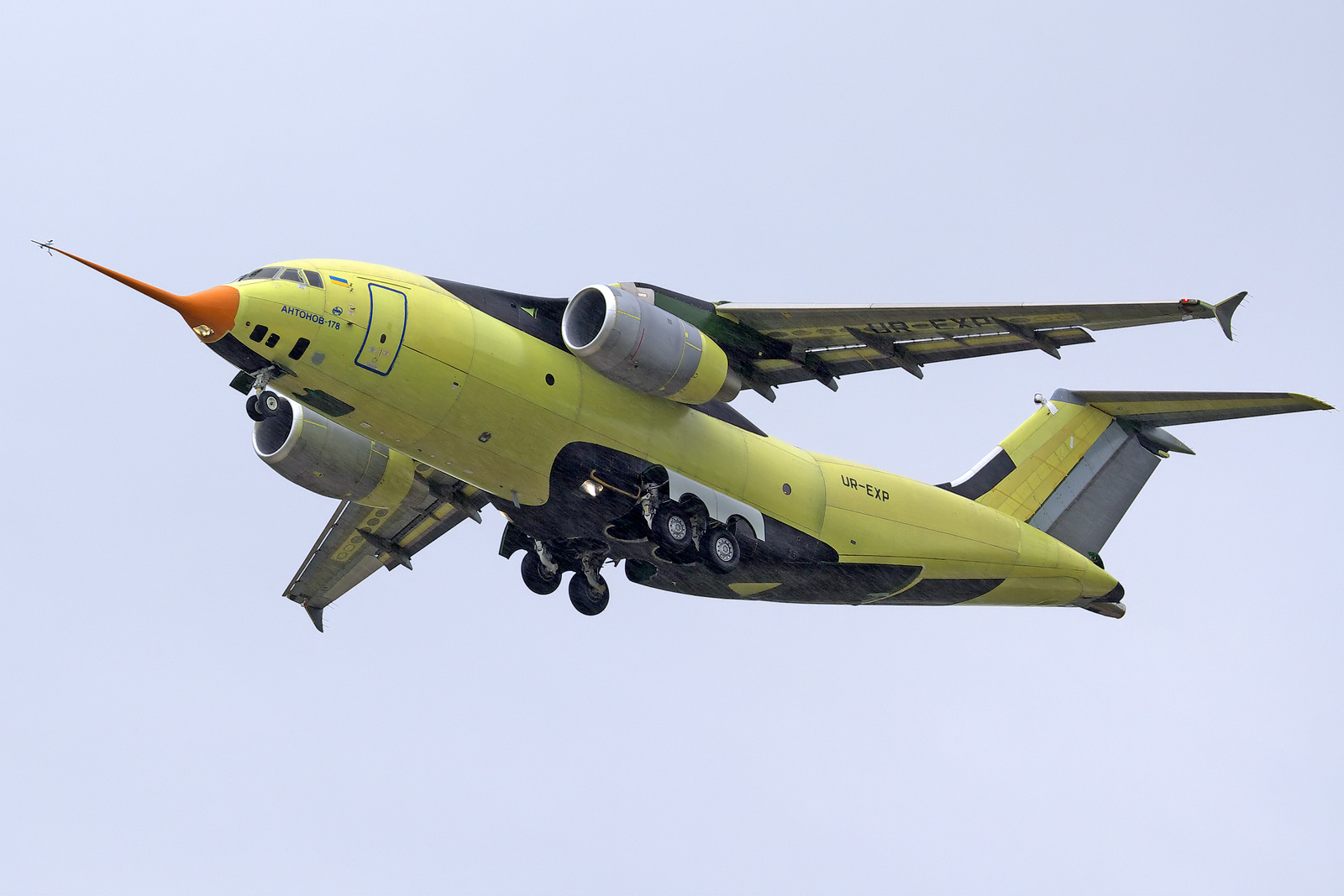
The An-178 prototype in flight

=== Orders and letters of intent ===
United Arab Emirates

- Maximus Air – Letter of intent

Azerbaijan

- Silk Way Airlines – launch customer with a firm order for 10 aircraft placed in May 2015. Cancelled

Saudi Arabia

- Royal Saudi Air Force – Letter of intent for 30 aircraft, though the planned order was later reported to have been cancelled.

Iraq

- Iraqi Army – 2 on order

China

- A-Star – China Beijing technology company placed order for 50 aircraft and proposed to establish joint production in PRC.

Ukraine

- Ministry of Internal Affairs of Ukraine - ordered 13 aircraft
- Ukrainian Air Force – ordered 3 aircraft (AN-178-100P) (The assembly of the first one started in spring 2021)

Peru

- Ministry of the Interior of Peru – ordered 1 aircraft, which was later cancelled.

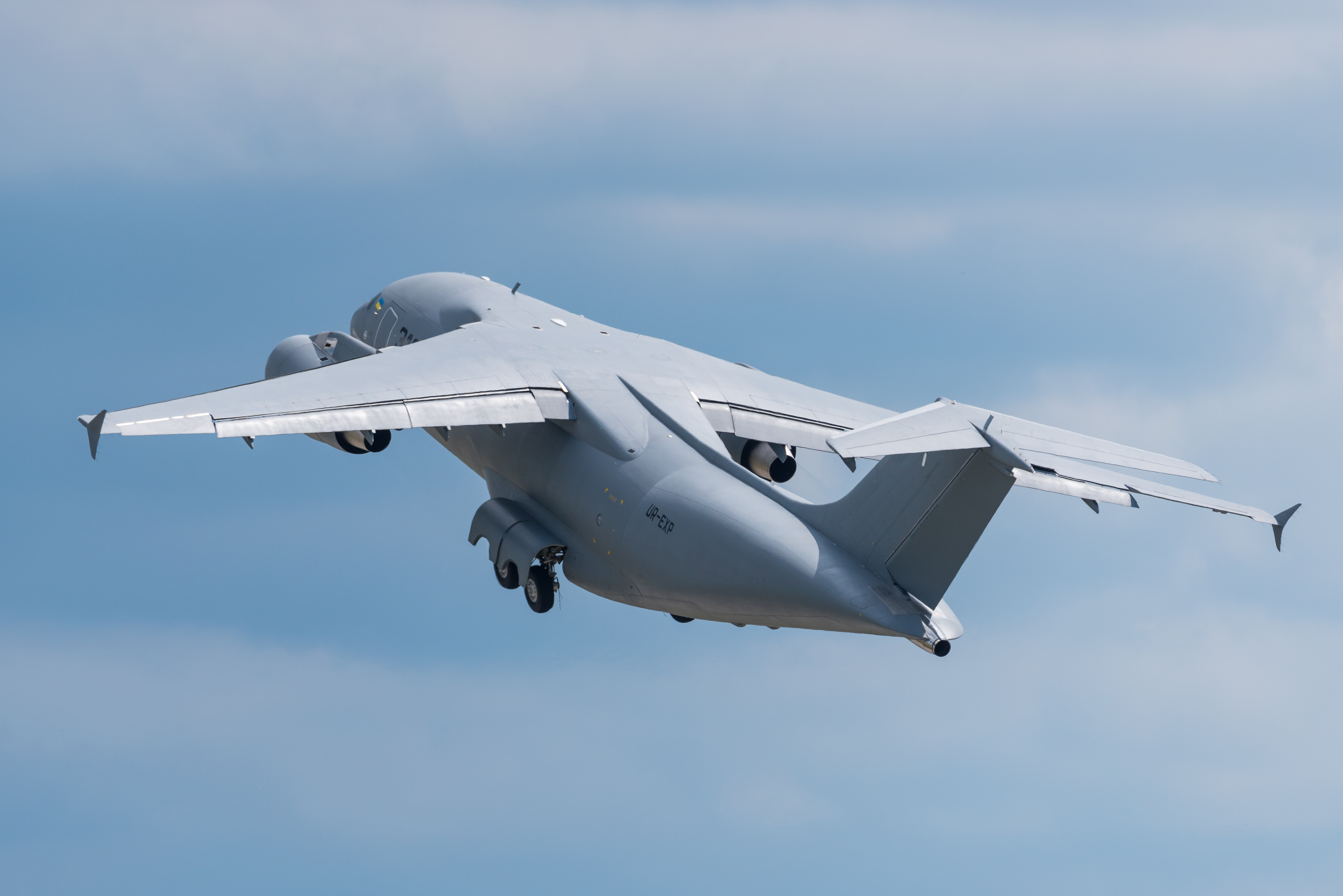
An-178 during the 2016 ILA Berlin Air Show.

== Specifications ==
Data from

General characteristics

- Crew: 2
- Capacity: 90 soldiers, 70 paratroopers, 48 on stretchers +15 seated, 8 medical modules and 12, or 16 tons of cargo, overload variant 18 tons.
- Length: 32.23 m (105 ft 9 in)
- Wingspan: 30.57 m (100 ft 4 in)
- Height: 9.57 m (31 ft 5 in)
- Max takeoff weight: 51,000–52,400 kg (112,436–115,522 lb)
- Fuel capacity: 14,650 kg (32,298 lb)
- Max landing weight: 47,000 kg (103,617 lb)
- Powerplant: 2 × Progress D-436-148FM turbofans
- Thrust each: 73.55 kN (16,534 lbf)
- Maximum speed: 990 km/h (620 mph, 530 kn)
- Cruise speed: 825 km/h (513 mph, 445 kn)
- Range: 3,680 km (2,290 mi, 1,990 nmi) with 10-ton payload
- Ferry range: 5,300 km (3,300 mi, 2,900 nmi)
- Service ceiling: 12,200 m (40,000 ft)
- Required field length (ISA, SL): 2,500 m (8,200 ft)

== See also ==
Related development

- Antonov An-71
- Antonov An-72
- Antonov An-74
- Antonov An-148

Aircraft of comparable role, configuration, and era

- Embraer KC-390
- Ilyushin Il-276
- Kawasaki C-2
