= Ilyushin Il-276 =

Russian military transport aircraft

Ilyushin Il-276 (SVTS)
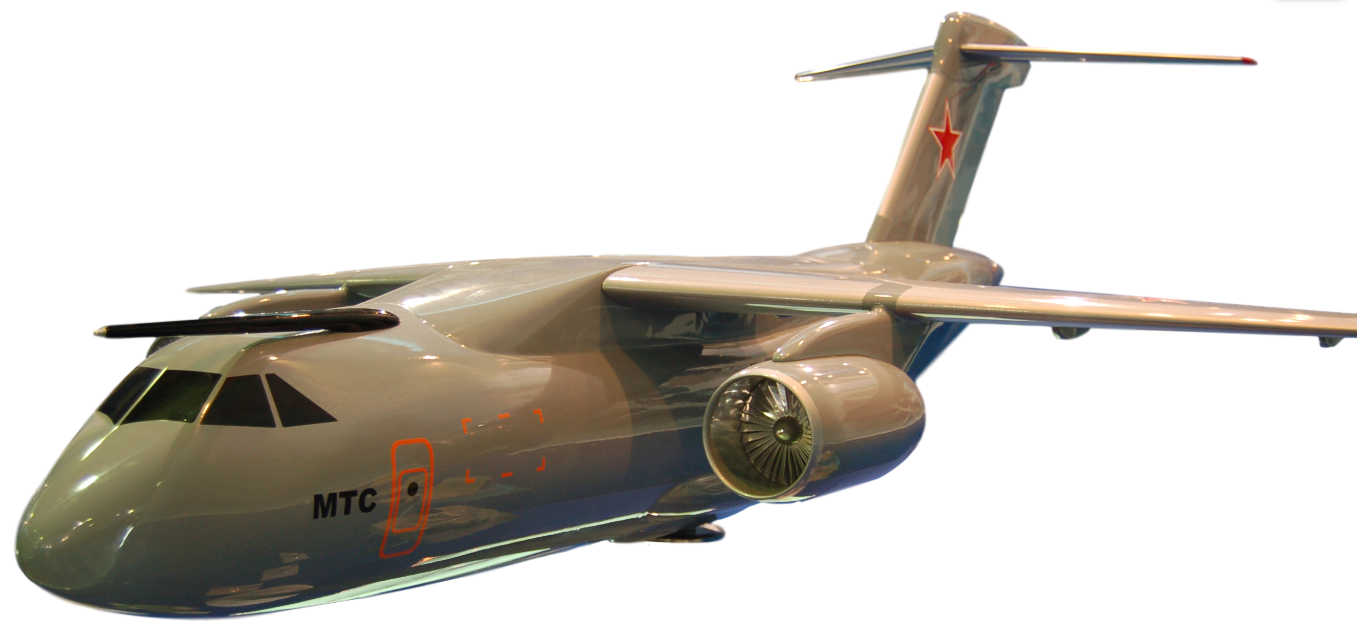
- A model of the Il-276 at the MAKS exhibition in 2009.

General information
- Type: Military transport aircraft
- Manufacturer: United Aircraft Corporation
- Status: Under development
- Primary user: Russian Aerospace Forces

History
- Introduction date: Under development
- First flight: Sometime in 2026

The Ilyushin Il-276 (SVTS) (Russian: Средний военно-транспортный самолет [СВТС]) is a medium-airlift military transport aircraft currently being developed by initially United Aircraft Corporation (UAC). It is designed to perform regular transport duties and also to deploy up to 150 paratrooper soldiers or up to 20 tons of cargo. According to the Russian press, the Il-276 is expected to begin flight testing in 2023 and deliver the first units in 2026. Ilyushin intends to achieve an annual production rate of 12 units by 2029.

It was initially planned to be built by the United Aircraft Corporation (UAC) of Russia, and Hindustan Aeronautics Limited (HAL) of India. The two companies began the joint venture in 2009, when it was expected that each would be investing US$300 million in the project. The Ilyushin Il-276 was intended to replace the Indian Air Force's ageing fleet of Antonov An-32 transport aircraft. In January 2016 it was announced that the India's HAL would no longer be involved in the project and that Russia was proceeding with the project alone.

== Design and development ==
In October 2009, former Indian Defence Minister A. K. Antony made an official visit to Russia, during which the two countries formally incorporated the joint venture. The governments of Russia and India agreed to produce the aircraft for their respective armed forces and for friendly third-party countries, and to develop a civilian variant of the MTA in the form of a 100-seater passenger airplane, for which Hindustan Aeronautics Ltd (HAL) – owned by the Indian government – will be the lead partner and principal integrator. The Indian portion of the MTA's serial production would take place at HAL's Transport Aircraft Division in Kanpur.

India and Russia finalised arrangements to support the MTA's development with a contribution of US$300.35 million. Russia's United Aircraft Corporation (UAC) and India's HAL will set up a subsidiary company to develop the aircraft. The new company, supported by US$600.7 million in funding, will begin work on developing the MTA immediately. HAL chairman and managing director (CMD) Ashok Nayak confirmed that India would acquire 45 aircraft and Russia 105. There would, however, be scope for exporting the aircraft, both for civil and military use, and more MTAs could be manufactured. In October 2012, HAL signed a preliminary design contract with UAC, stipulating that joint design work would begin in Moscow, involving 30 Indian engineers as well as UAC's design team. In February 2015, India cancelled its existing international tender on medium-lift military transport aircraft, formalising its intent to purchase the MTA.

The aircraft is expected to be powered by Russian-made Aviadvigatel PD-14M turbofan engines attached to top-mounted wings, and will have a T-shaped tail. The cabin size would be similar to the Ilyushin Il-76, but will be half the length, supporting a maximum payload of 20 tonnes (44,000 lb) of military or civilian cargo. The aircraft's maximum range is expected to be 2,500 kilometres (1,600 mi), and its top speed will be around 870 km/h (540 mph).

On 13 January 2016, Russian state media reported that Ilyushin had "frozen" the Russian-Indian project, and that Russia would assume full responsibility for detailed design and production of the aircraft.

In October 2017, Russian newspaper Izvestia reported that in June 2017 the aircraft received new official name Il-276. Earlier in the Russian media the project MTA-SVTS was called Il-214. It was also reported that at the present the military department is in talks with Russian aircraft builders about timing of the program and creating the Il-276. It's already certain that Russia will need no less than 55 units of this aircraft.

In June 2020, The Russian Ministry of Defense officially announced the selection of the Ilyushin Il-276 as the new medium-sized military transport aircraft.

In February 2023, on the sideline of the Aero India 2023 air show and exhibition, a Russian delegation from Rostec held talks with Indian officials on the possibility of the joint development of the Il-276. Rostec proposed to renew the offer to co-develop the aircraft, and to allow the sale and the assembly of the Il-276 within India. However, India would prefer the aircraft to come with European engine instead of Russian engine, which is unlikely to be possible for Russia to propose. India announced they would continue work with Russia on the project in 2026.

== Specifications ==
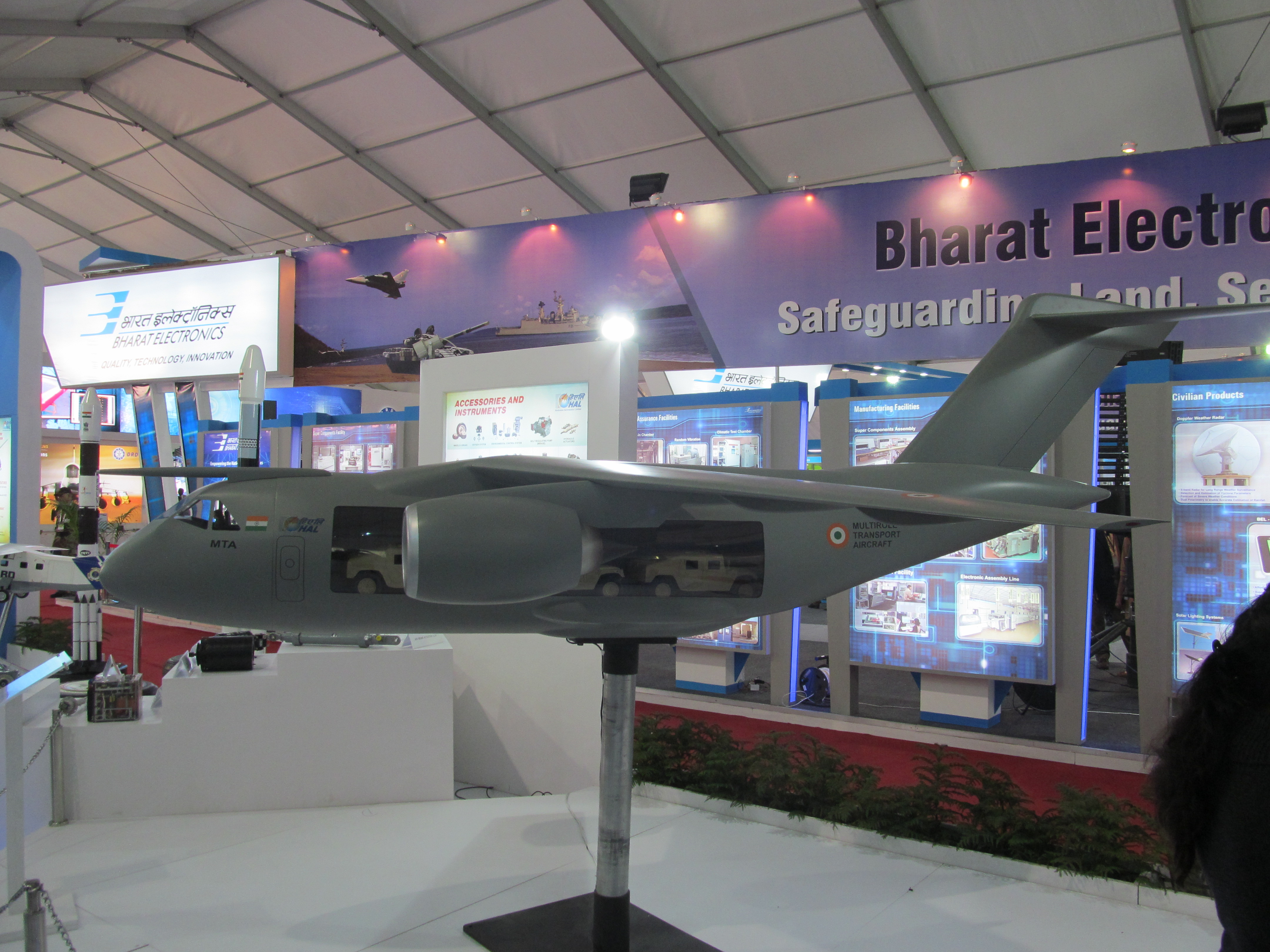
A side cut view of the aircraft's cargo bay.

Data from UACRussia.ru and Ilyushin.org

General characteristics

- Crew: 3
- Capacity: 70 to 150 passengers
- Payload: 20,000 kilograms (44,000 lb)
- Length: 37.7 m (123 ft 8 in)
- Wingspan: 35.5 m (116 ft 6 in)
- Height: 12.95 m (42 ft 6 in)
- Wing area: 160 m^{2} (1,700 sq ft)
- Max takeoff weight: 72,000 kg (158,733 lb)
- Fuel capacity: 30,700 kilograms (67,700 lb)
- Powerplant: 2 × Aviadvigatel PD-14M turbofan engines, 152.98 kN (34,392 lbf) thrust each

Performance

- Maximum speed: 870 km/h (540 mph, 470 kn)
- Cruise speed: 800 km/h (500 mph, 430 kn)
- Range: 2,000 km (1,200 mi, 1,100 nmi) with payload of 20,000 kilograms (44,000 lb)
- Ferry range: 7,300 km (4,500 mi, 3,900 nmi)
- Service ceiling: 13,100 m (43,000 ft)
- Takeoff run: 1,050 metres (3,440 ft)
- Landing run: 1,050 metres (3,440 ft)

== See also ==
Aircraft of comparable role, configuration, and era

- Antonov An-178
- Embraer C-390 Millennium
- Kawasaki C-2
