= Aircraft Repair Plant 410 (Kyiv) =

Ukrainian aircraft services company

Coordinates: 50.4109°N 30.4367°E

State Enterprise Plant 410 Civil Aviation

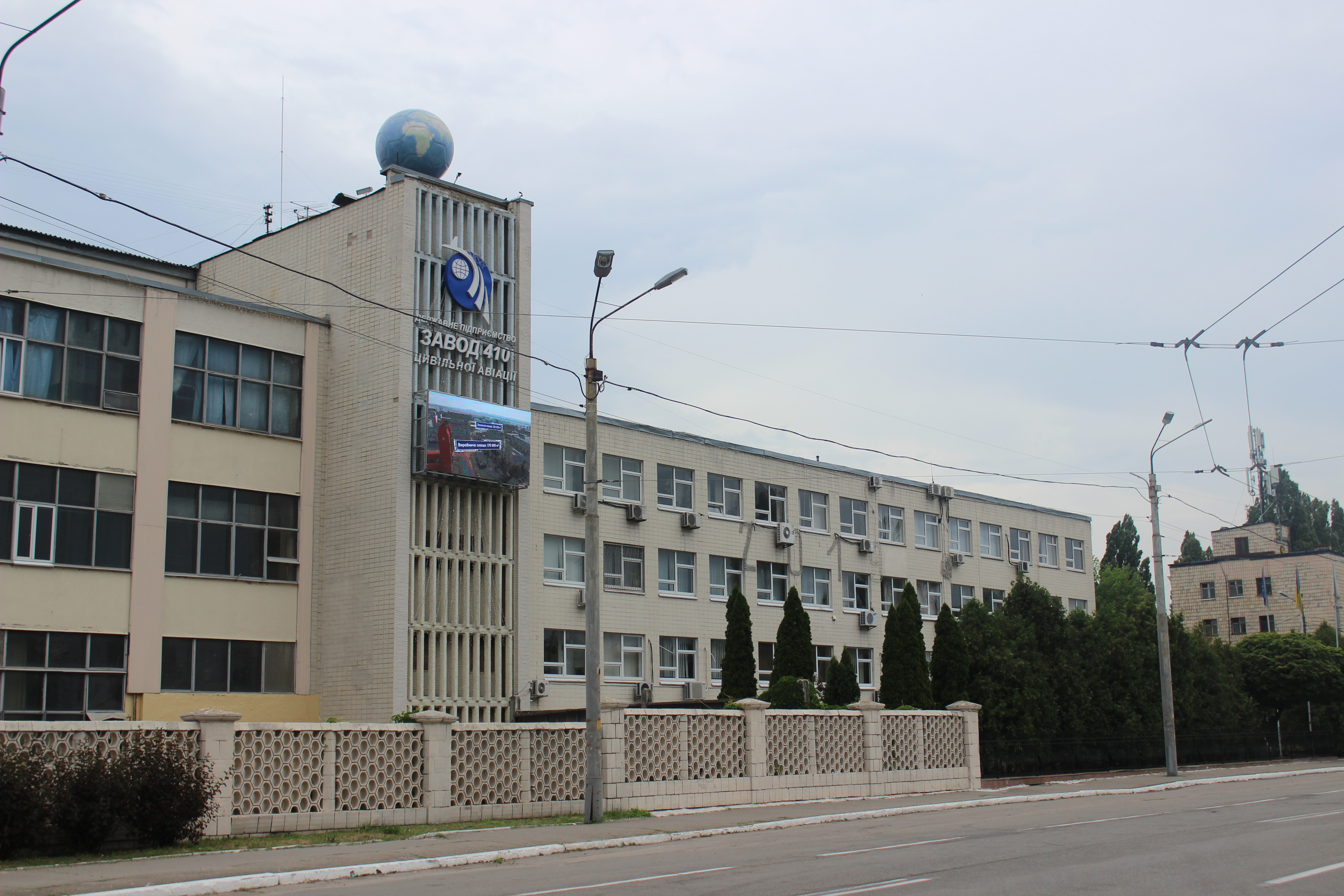
- Head office of the plant in Kyiv, Ukraine
- Type: State-owned company
- Industry: Aerospace
- Founded: 1948
- Headquarters: Kyiv, Ukraine
- Key people: Alexander Pashinsky O.V. Kiprov (Chief Structural Engineer)
- Products: Airplane maintenance
- Operating income: $28.2 million USD
- Number of employees: 2,100 (2003)
- Parent: Ukroboronprom

Plant 410 Civil Aviation (Ukrainian: Завод 410 цивільної авіації) is a Ukrainian aircraft services company, based in Kyiv adjacent to the Kyiv Zhuliany International Airport.

Primary services provided are repair of An-24, An-26, An-30, An-32 aircraft and their modifications; testing and restoration of An-72, An-74 aircraft and their modifications; repair of D-36 engines for Yak-42 and An-74 aircraft; maintenance of Ka-26 helicopters; repair of wheels and brake assembly of Boeing 737 aircraft.

The company also operated, until 2007, ARP 410 Airlines, performing charter flights for cargo and passengers.

== History ==
=== Beginning — 2000 ===
On November 6, 1948 Aviation Repair Base № 410 of Civil Air Fleet was established.

In 1972, the plant mastered the repair of Ivchenko AI-9 aircraft auxiliary power unit for the Yak-40 passenger aircraft.

In November 1988, the plant mastered the overhaul of the Ivchenko Progress D-36 turbofan aircraft engine.

In February 1991, the Union of Aviation Engine Building Association was established on the basis of the main department of the USSR Ministry of Aviation Industry, which included aircraft repair and engine building enterprises of the USSR (including the 410th Aircraft Repair Plant).

After the proclamation of Ukraine's independence, the 410th Aircraft Repair Plant was renamed into 410th Civil Aviation Plant.

In May 1999, ARP-410 Airlines was established on the basis of the plant's air fleet. It provided 1% of Ukraine's passenger traffic in 2005. It ceased operations in 2007.

=== 2001—2014 ===
On July 12, 2001, the Government of Ukraine adopted a law on state support of enterprises in the aircraft industry of Ukraine. The list of enterprises included the 410th plant.

In January 2004, the 410th Civil Aviation Plant presented a demonstration model of UAV model Arctur.

In September 2004, the plant was granted the status of a special exporter.

In July 2005, the Cabinet of Ministers of Ukraine adopted a resolution on the establishment of the national vertically integrated research and production association Antonov, which included among others Kyiv 410th Civil Aviation Plant.

In February 2007, the plant delivered one An-26 aircraft to the Ukrainian Navy.

On June 15, 2009, the Ministry of Defense of India and the Ukrainian state company Spetstechnoexport signed a contract for the overhaul and modernization of 40 Indian An-32 aircraft to be conducted by the 410th Civil Aviation Plant.

In the early 2014, the Ukrainian government banned military-technical cooperation with Russia which had a negative impact on the plant.

=== 2016 ===
In 2016, the plant repaired six An-26 for the state law enforcement agencies of Ukraine.

In May 2016, the plant received a NATO AQAP 2120 certificate of conformity for the modernization of An-26 aircraft according to NATO standards.

On July 30, 2016, an An-74TK-300 aircraft of Ukraine Air Enterprise arrived at the plant for maintenance.

On August 29, 2016, an An-72-100D aircraft of the Sudanese Armed Forces arrived at the plant for maintenance (it was repaired and handed over to Sudan on February 3, 2017).

On December 30, 2016, the plant handed over the second repaired An-72 and the repaired An-26 of the Air Defense Forces of Kazakhstan.

=== 2017 ===
On February 14, 2017, the plant took part in the exhibition "Aero India - 2017".

On March 16, 2017, the plant received the An-32 aircraft of the Ministry of Defense of the People's Republic of Bangladesh for overhaul.

On March 30, 2017, he handed over to Kazakhstan two repaired An-26 of the Ministry of Defense of the Republic of Kazakhstan.

On May 3, 2017, an An-74-200 aircraft of the Sudanese government arrived at the plant for overhaul.

=== 2019 ===
In February 2019, the plant began providing repair and maintenance services for Boeing with two Boeing 737-500 aircraft.
