= Phantom (unmanned ground vehicle) =

Ukrainian military vehicle

Phantom is a Ukrainian multi-purpose tactical unmanned ground vehicle designed by Spetstechnoexport 2016 for use in the Ukroboronprom (Ukrainian Defense Agency). Applications of the Phantom include reconnaissance, fire support, evacuation of the wounded, ammunition delivery, and repair work.

== Technical characteristics ==
Range — 20 km.

Max. speed — 38 km/h.

Engine — hybrid, power 30 kW.

Payload — 350 kg.

Control — secure radio channel with a range of 2.5 km or fiber optic cable of 5 km length.

The device is equipped with a system for integration with UAVs.

=== Armament ===
Day and night aiming systems, allowing to fire at distances of more than 2 km and 1 km respectively.

The device is armed with a 12.7-mm machine gun on a stabilized platform. The rate of fire has 3 modes.

There is an option to install an anti-tank missile system.

== History ==
On 29 August 2016, "Phantom" was demonstrated to the Secretary of the National Security and Defense Council of Ukraine, Oleksandr Turchynov.

"Phantom" was publicly presented for the first time on 11 October 2016 at the "Arms and Security - 2016" exhibition in Kyiv.

== Gallery ==
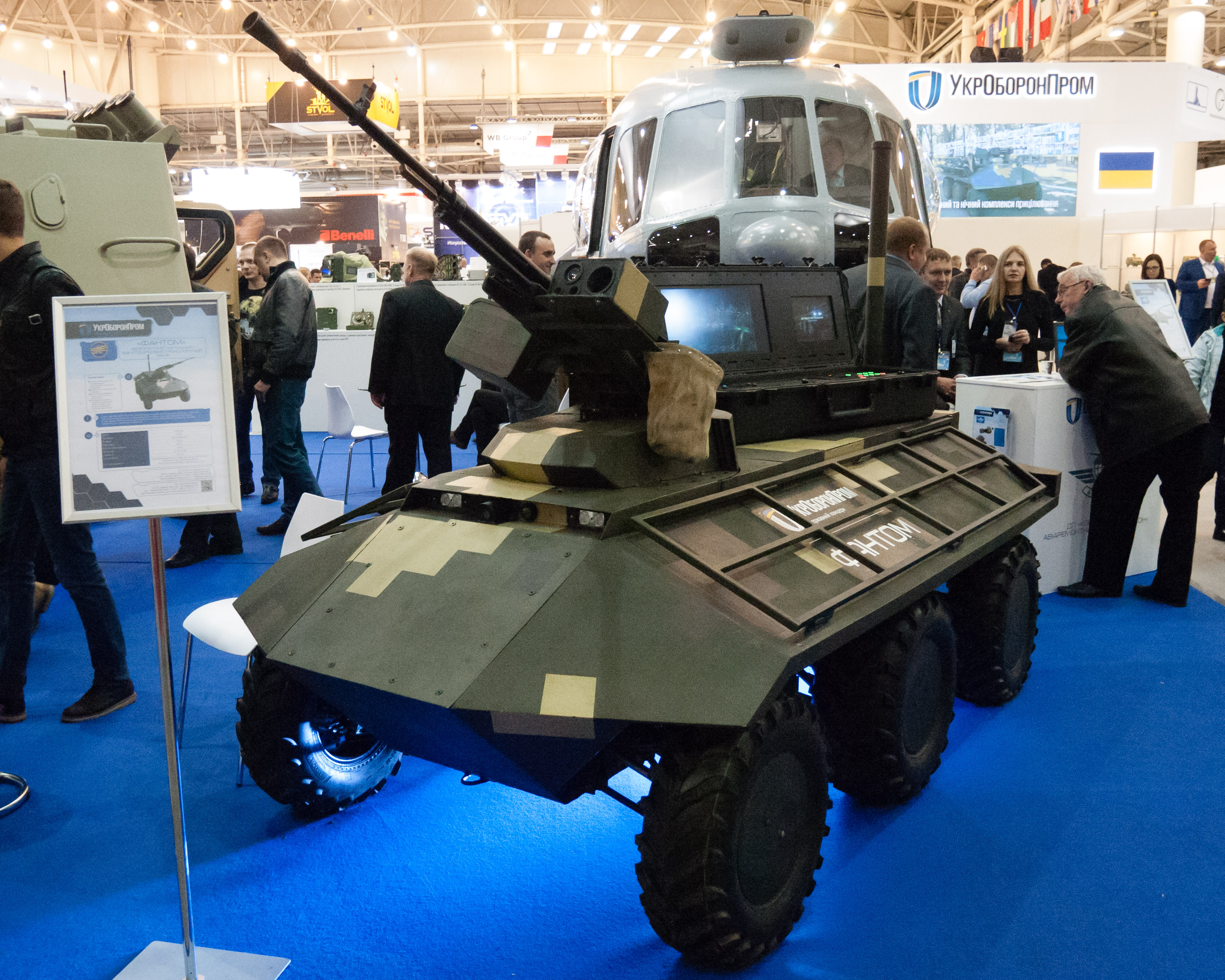

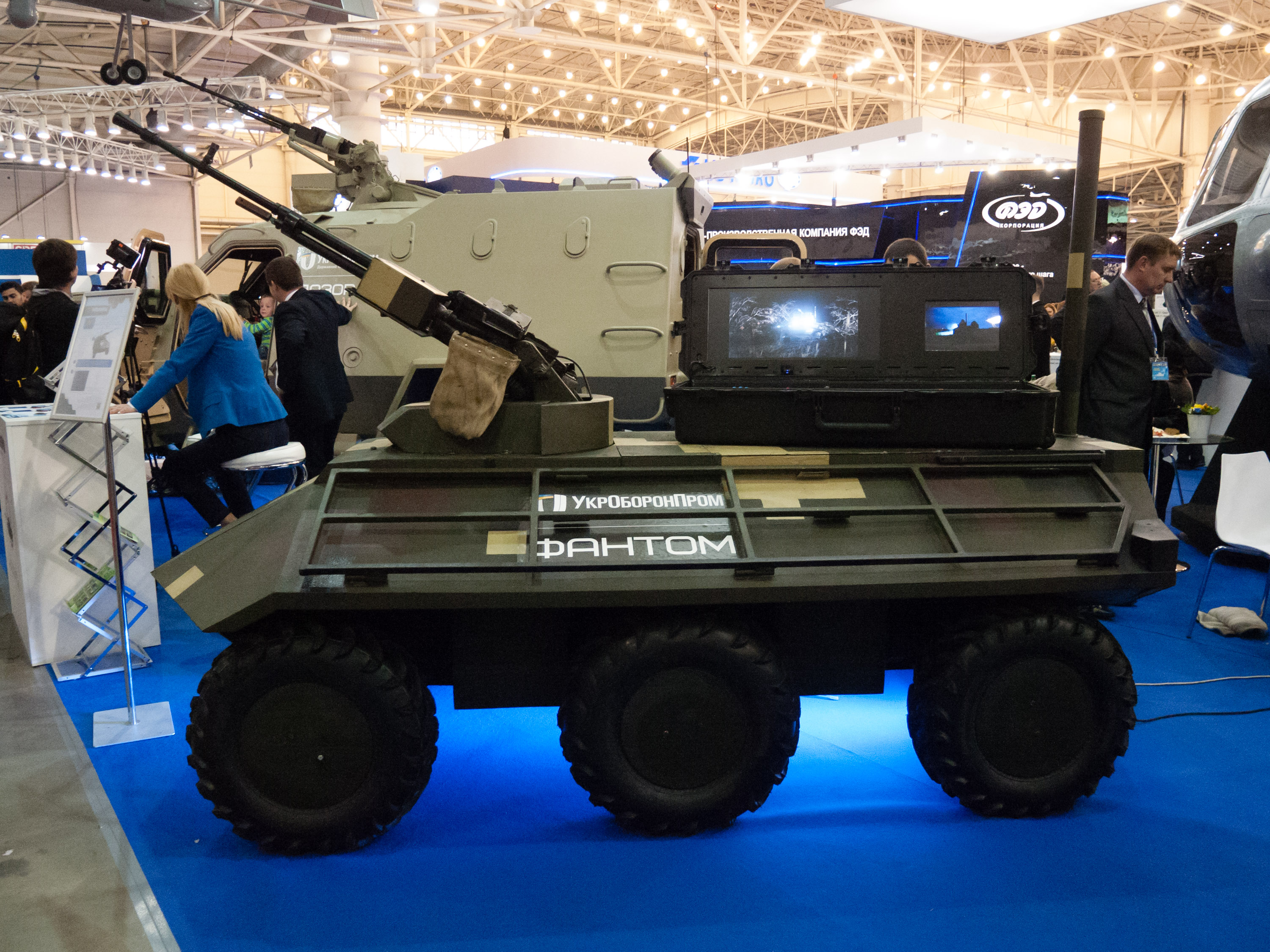

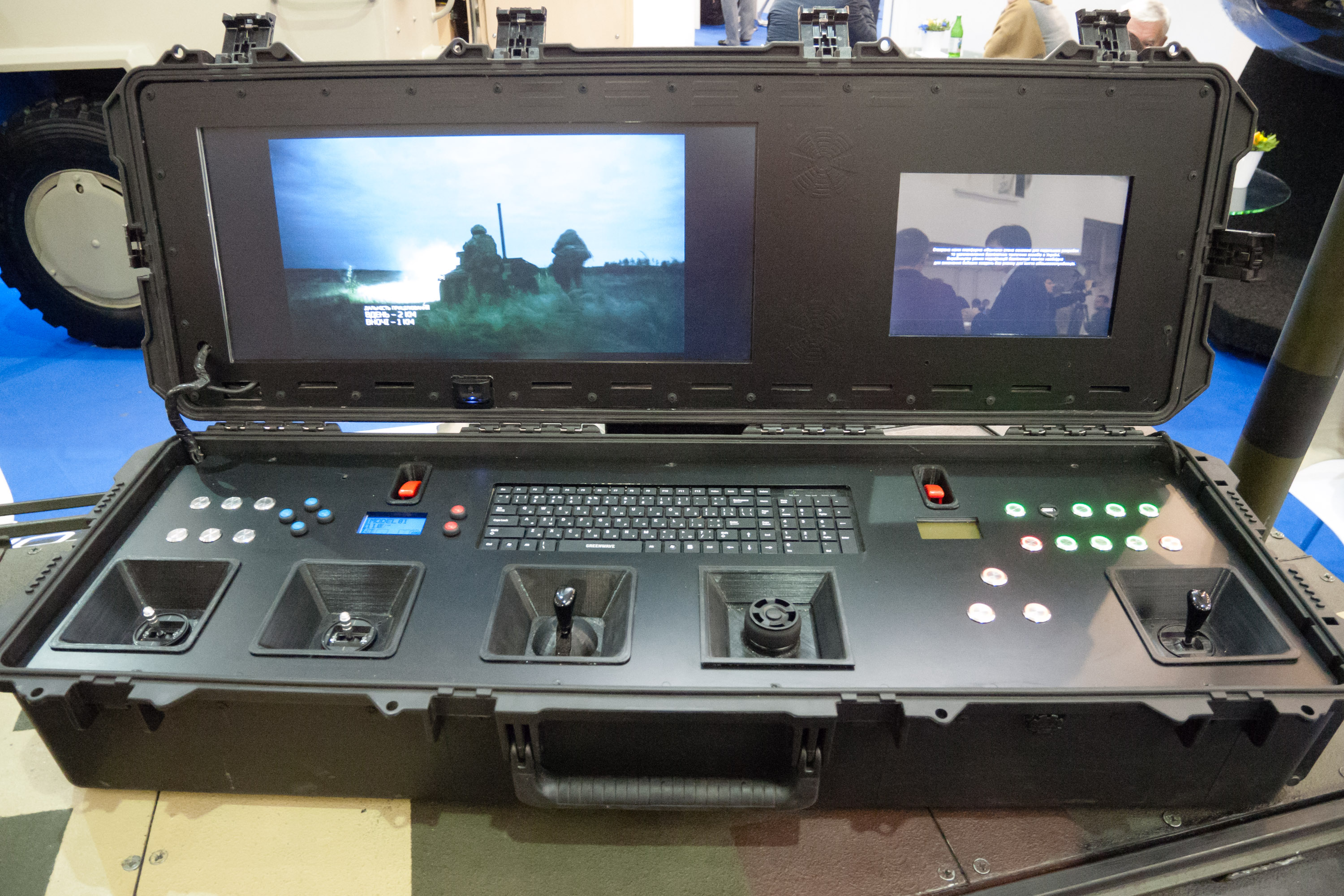
Control panel

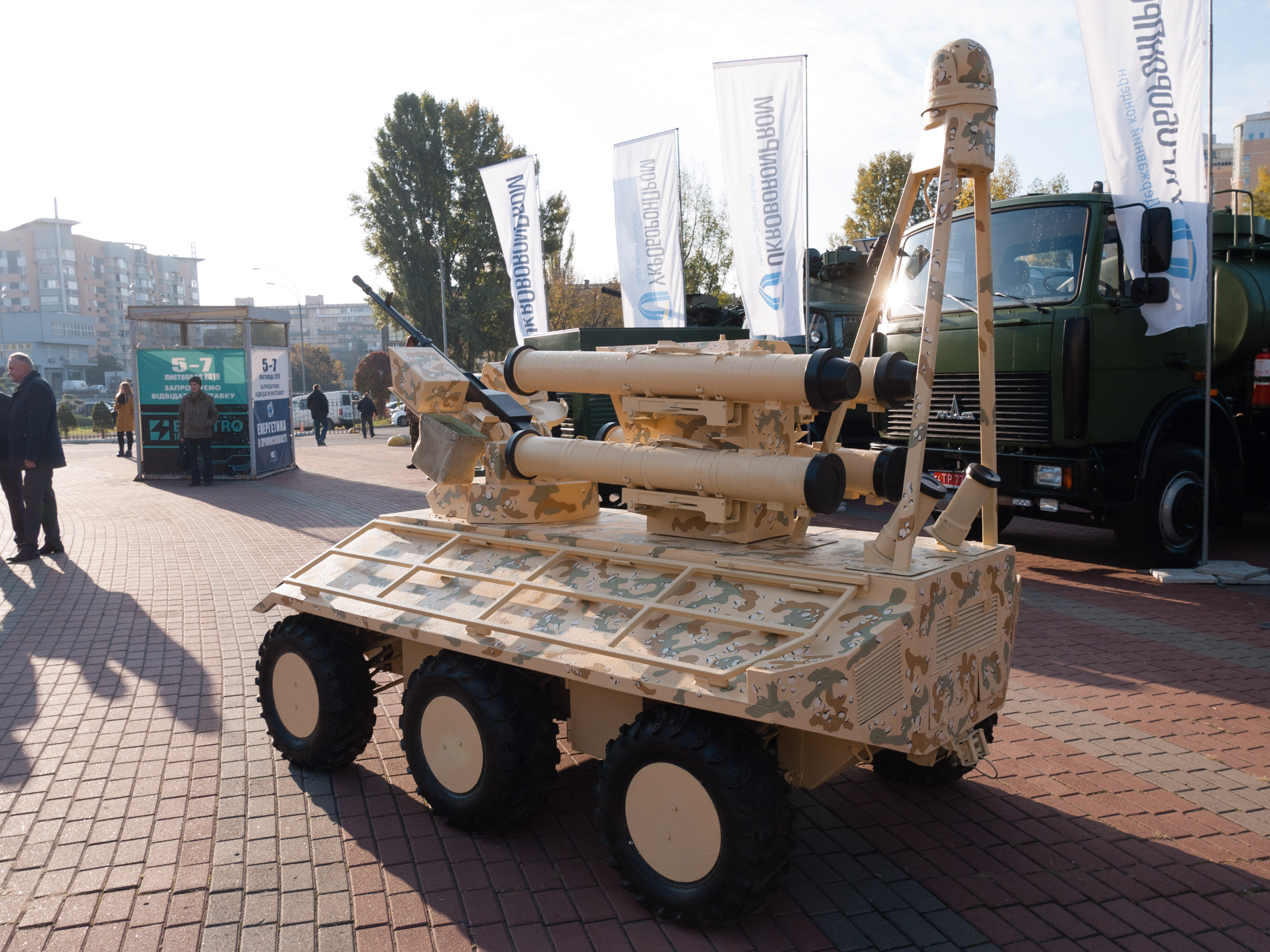

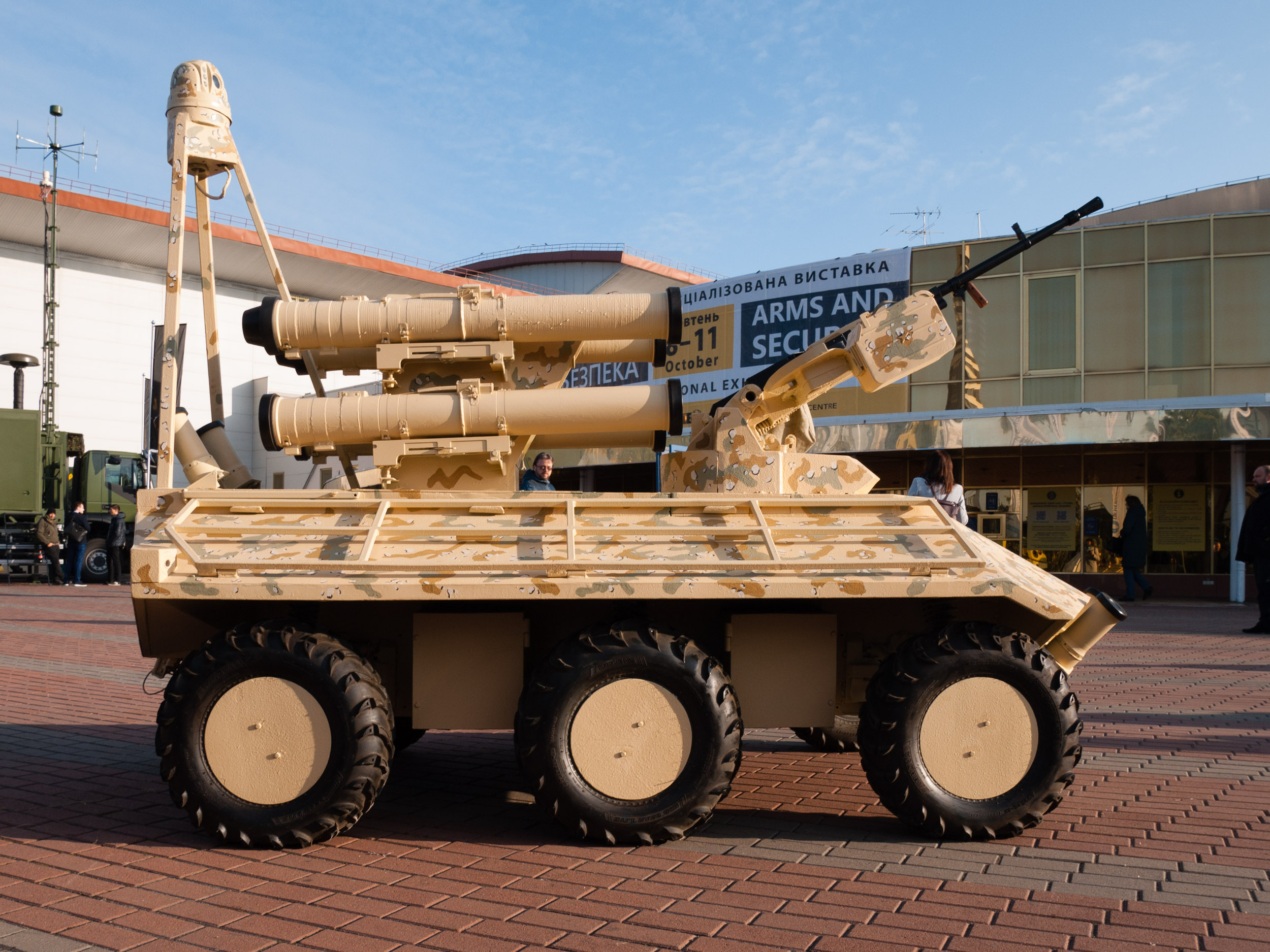

== See also ==
- THeMIS
