= Lukiaviatrans =

Russian charter airline

- Founded: 1994
- Hubs: Maksimovo Airport, Velikie, Pskov
- Fleet size: Undisclosed
- Headquarters: Maksimovo Airport, Velikie, Pskov
- Key people: Michael N. Tumanov (Director), Oleg Tumanov (Deputy Director), Vladimir F. Nikitin (Finance Director)
- Website: https://lukiaviatrans.net/en/

Lukiaviatrans is a Russian charter airline based at Maksimovo Airport, Pskov, which carries out aerial photography, aerial chemical work (e.g. crop spraying), aerial fire-fighting, aircraft maintenance, oil and gas pipeline monitoring, and crop clearance around pipelines.

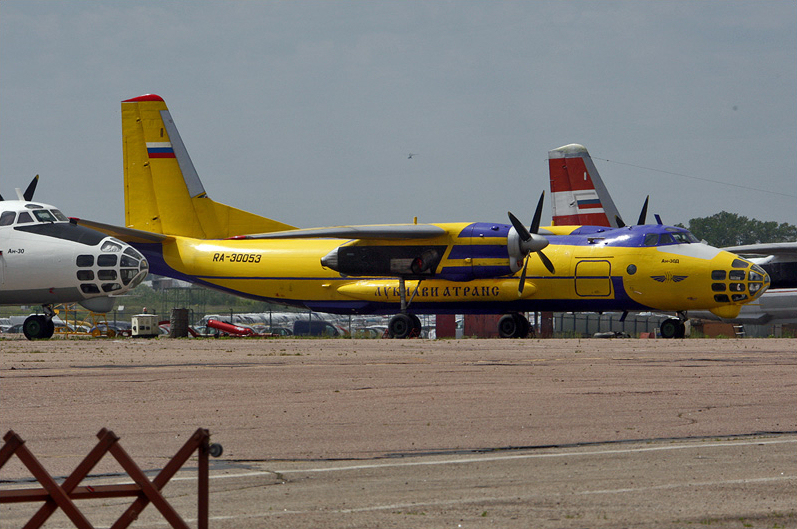
Lukiaviatrans Antonov An-30 in 2008

== Fleet ==
Aircraft type	Active	Notes
Antonov An-30	undisclosed	
Antonov An-30D	undisclosed	
Antonov An-26	undisclosed	
Antonov An-2	undisclosed	
Mil Mi-8	undisclosed	
Mil Mi-2	undisclosed	
