= ARP 410 Airlines =

Ukrainian airline

ARP 410 Airlines Авіакомпанія «ARP 410»
IATA	ICAO	Call sign
-	URP	AIR-ARP
- Founded: 1999
- Ceased operations: 2007
- Fleet size: 19
- Parent company: Aircraft Repair Plant 410 (Kyiv)
- Headquarters: Kyiv, Ukraine
- Website: http://www.arp410.com.ua

ARP 410 Airlines (Ukrainian: Державне підприємство Завод 410 цивільної авіації «Авіакомпанія «ARP 410») (EN:State Enterprise Plant 410 Civil Aviation "Airline 410") was an airline based in Kyiv, Ukraine. It operated passenger and cargo services throughout Ukraine and to destinations in Europe, South-East Asia and Africa. It was established in May 1999 and its main base was Kyiv International Airport (Zhuliany), Kyiv. ARP 410 Airlines ceased operations in 2007.

== Fleet ==
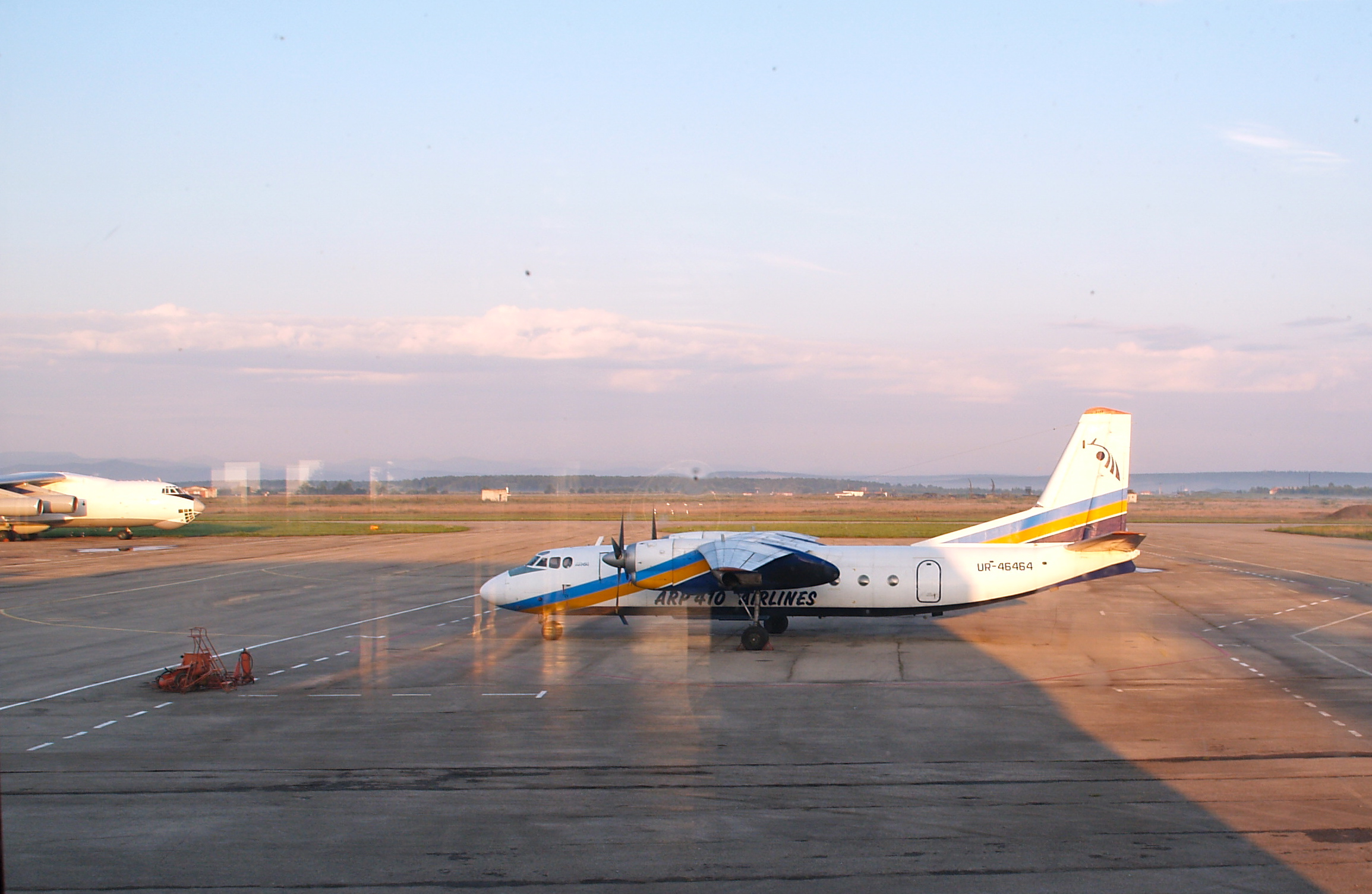
Ivano-Frankivsk — flight to Kyiv

The ARP 410 Airlines fleet includes the following aircraft (at March 2007):

- 2 Antonov An-24B
- 7 Antonov An-24RV
- 1 Antonov An-26
- 4 Antonov An-26B
- 2 Antonov An-30
