= Roman Romanov (Ukrainian businessman) =

Ukrainian politician (born 1972)

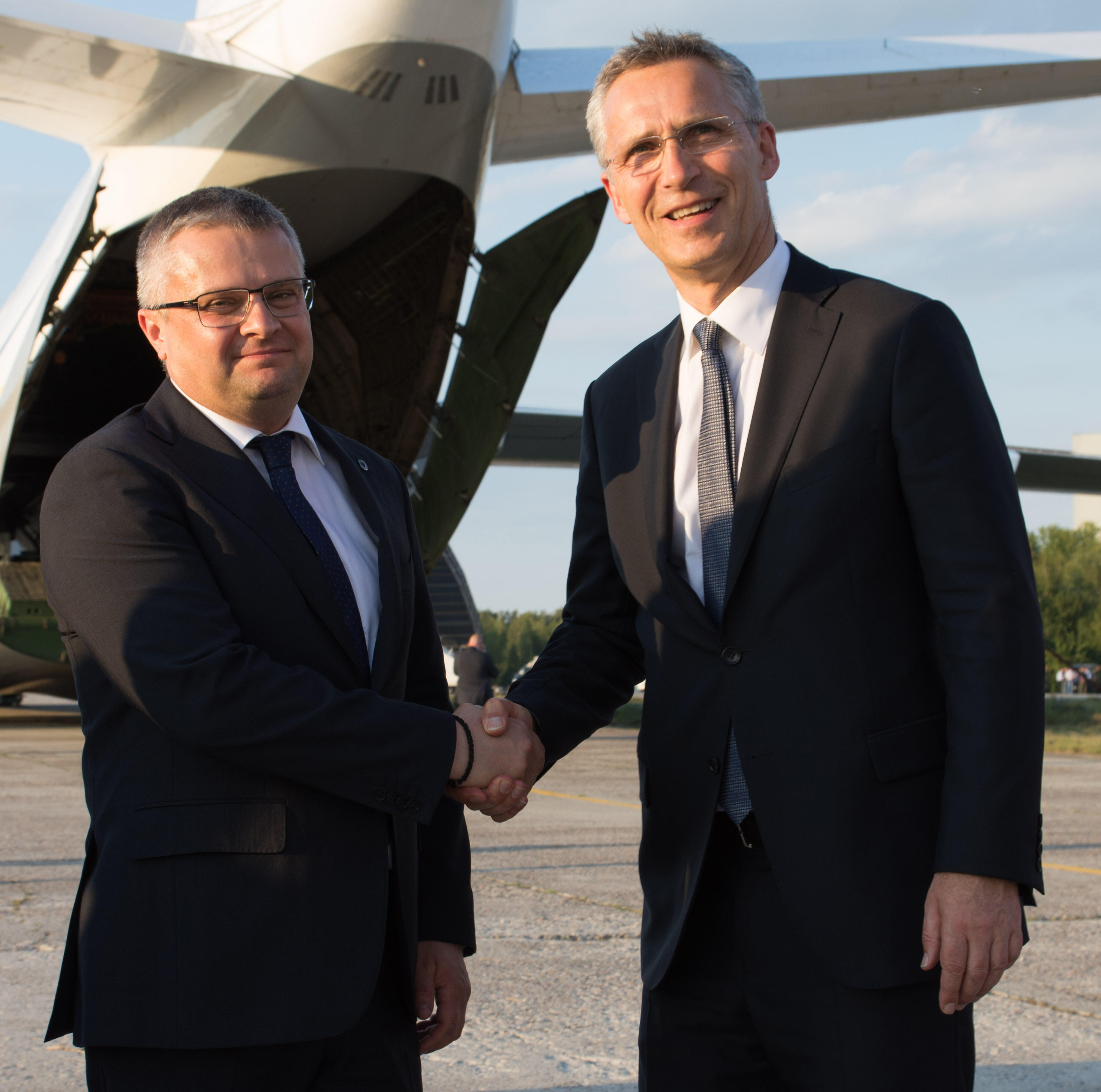
- Romanov (left) meeting Jens Stoltenberg, 2017
- Born: November 12, 1972 (age 53); Potsdam, East Germany

Roman Anatoliyovych Romanov (Ukrainian: Роман Анатолійович Романов; born 12 November 1972) is a Ukrainian businessman, politician, ex-leader of "Ukroboronprom".

== Career ==
The company founded by Romanov is developing mutual projects with the USA, supporting the economy of Ukraine during the 2022 Russian invasion of Ukraine. Mutual Ukraine-US business started from export, and now the production of the same reinforced concrete products as in Ukraine is being established in the USA. The special manufacturing plant Orange Pavers is being constructed.

Since 2006 – Deputy of the City Council of Kherson, Chairman of Permanent Commission

Since 2010 – Deputy of the Regional Council of Kherson Oblast – Member of the Permanent Commission on Industry, Constructions and Housing and Municipal Services

Since 4 July 2014 – Director General of the State Concern “Ukroboronprom” (Decree of the President of Ukraine #569/2014, July 4)

12 February 2018 - Romanov announced the decision to resign from the post of the head of “Ukroboronprom”.

Since 2018 – Romanov has been counseling the team of Ukrainian company Mosquito Control Ltd, which has developed Mosqitter – a software/hardware solution for protection against mosquitoes on large territories – by implementing a non-toxic approach to tackle mosquito-related problems and diseases such as malaria, dengue, Zika virus. He developed the concept of creating the Global monitoring system which will track mosquitoes’ activity in the world, identify high-risk areas and prevent mosquitoes-borne diseases. The company became the winner of the industry session during the SelectUSA Investment Summit and entered the top 6 hardware startups of Ukraine according to UVCA and Deloitte, the top 5 the most prominent companies of small and medium business in Ukraine in 2021. It received the National award Energy globe for sustainable development, the award for the best startup at IT Arena 2021, and entered the top 8 hardware manufacturers in the “Tech for good” category at Web Summit 2020.

== Management of "Ukroboronprom" ==
The management team of “Ukroboronprom” headed by Romanov made the State Concern profitable for the first time in a long period. In 2016, net income of “Ukroboronprom” amounted to more than ₴28.3 billion, and export volume grew up to 25% due to the organization of system work with international partners from about 100 countries. In 2016, Ukrainian Defense Industry Day was held in NATO headquarters for the first time, and a Ukrainian military–industrial complex reforming strategy was developed. State Concern was first to introduce a system of e-procurement among industrial giants of Ukraine and saved approximately ₴1 billion within 2 years.

== Achievements ==
- In the worldwide TOP-100 Defense News Rating 2017 Romanov ranked 62 place, in 2016 - 68 place, in 2015 – 92 place (up to 24 positions since 2015).
- For 2014-2017, "Ukroboronprom" has risen by 14 positions – from 91 to 77th place – in the SIPRI world ranking of arms manufacturers.
- Within 1,5 years the company under Romanov's management occupied 9 positions in the TOP-10 Forbes national rating of the most innovative companies of Ukraine.
- Within 2 years, in the system of post-Soviet industry modern managerial tools were introduced: KPI, e-procurement, global trainings, import substitution, global cooperation, etc.
- “Ukroboronprom” is headed for technological innovation. In 2016, the latest Concern developments like AN-132, UGV “Phantom” were represented, and the Aircraft Cluster was created engaging private sector companies as a manifestation of “Ukroboronprom” openness. For example, “Antonov” company as a part of “Ukroboronprom” increased its income by 4 times: in 2014 its profit was ₴39.3 million and increased by ₴178.1 million in 2016.
- In 2017, «Ukroboronprom» has fully completed the State Defense Order and handed over 3 673 units of weapons and equipment to the security agencies of the country, including 2 053 new and upgraded ones.
- The State Concern has significantly expanded the geography of partner countries and deepened cooperation with NATO. “Ukroboronprom” also pays special attention to combining science and industry – innovative development platform was created providing rapid implementation of national engineers’ ideas.
- “Ukroboronprom” developed reform strategy of the military-industrial complex of Ukraine providing an internal and external audit. It allows leading international experts to get an objective picture of the Concern focused on the effective use of resources, implementing international management standards and reporting systems. This will attract new investors offering them a clear principle for entering the capital, protecting investment and creating a unique market offer. Other key areas of “Ukroboronprom” defense reform strategy are clustering, corporatization, technology protection and creating of the innovation platform. In November 2017, “Ukroboronprom” launched a new phase of reform – an international audit. A tender committee is formed to choose a consulting company. A Transparency International - Ukraine specialist is a member of the committee.
- Memorandum of cooperation with all Ukrainian regions was signed within the Import Substitution Program.
- “Ukroboronprom” as a driver of applied science and education in Ukraine signed Memorandum with 48 higher educational institutions for cooperation on R&D projects. 5500 students completed internship at 56 enterprises of “Ukroboronprom” in 2016, and more than 500 young personnel ensured the employment at enterprises of “Ukroboronprom”.
- Over the past 2.5 years, when new management team of “Ukroboronprom” took charge, State Concern started promoting transparency and openness of defense industry sector: it began formation of the modern outlook and training of employees, expanded cooperation with Western partners and NATO manufacturers, prioritized innovations.
- In 2014, Ukrainian army had 6 000 militaries. Now, there are 80 000 highly specialized militaries in Armed Forces of Ukraine, and they were armed with military equipment produced by “Ukroboronprom”. No country has supplied lethal equipment to Ukraine during these years.
- On July 10, 2017, NATO Secretary General Jens Stoltenberg highly appreciated “Antonov” transport aircraft during his visit to Kiev. He discussed with the head of “Ukroboronprom” Roman Romanov the prospects for expanding the SALIS program on strategic transport activities for the member countries of NATO, and speeding up the transition of the “Ukroboronprom” enterprises to produce products according to the NATO standards.
- In 2017, "Ukroboronprom" first participated in the international defense exhibition AUSA-2017 in the USA. "Ukroboronprom" introduced machinery, manufactured according to world standards. In particular, it presented an improved version of the unmanned armored personnel carrier "Phantom-2".
- During the leadership of Romanov, the Ukrainian anti-ship cruise missile "Neptune" was developed, designed to destroy ships with a displacement of up to 5,000 tons. It has a warhead weighing 150 kg, subsonic speed (900 km/h) and flies at ultra-low altitudes - a few meters above sea level. The missile can maneuver during the flight, the range of which is up to 280 km. On April 13, two such missiles hit and sank the flagship of the Russian Black Sea Fleet Moskva.
