= Photoprylad =

Soviet-Ukrainian research complex

R&PC "Photoprylad"
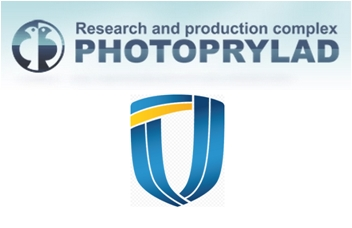
- Type: State Enterprise
- Industry: optical electronic devices
- Founded: 1962
- Headquarters: 85 B.Vyshnevetskiy Str, Cherkassy, Ukraine
- Key people: Korevo G. (general director)
- Owner: Government of Ukraine
- Number of employees: about 1000
- Parent: SC "Ukroboronprom"
- Website: http://photopribor.ck.ua

Photoprylad is a research and production complex that works to meet the needs of the Armed Forces of Ukraine, public health system, state institutions and organizations, specializing in development, design and production of optoelectronic devices and special-purpose equipment.

== History ==
Photoprylad founded in 1962 within the site of artel "Pobeda".

In 1965, the special design bureau was created, headed by Petrov I. and chief constructor Krivorotiy A.

From 1970 to 1972, Photoprylad took the lead in the design and production of devices for chemical-photographic processing, drying and interpretation of aerophotomaterials. Such space-oriented devices as "Svet", "Raccord", "Topaz" and others were developed and produced there. The first device was the interpretation marching kit PKD-1. The second was a device for washing photoprints PPO-1.

In 1972, precise mechanical devices production was initiated, along with optical mechanical, optical-electronic oriented (gyrocompass 1G-25 for determining true azimuth mounted on the artillery 1V12 complex.

In 1974, central design bureau "Sokol" was created as an individual organization. The chief constructor of CDB "Sokol" was Ablyazov R.

In 1974–1976, serial production of separate units and control equipment 9S475 started. It was mounted on the MI-24 helicopter.

In 1978, the CDB "Sokol" was an optical device for surveillance "IRIS". It was successfully tested with MI-24K helicopter.

In early 1980, the production of criminology devices was introduced, including the MC-1 microscope and REUS-1 reproduction installation.

In 1990, Photoprylad started to produce medical equipment, including ophthalmological devices "Stimul", "Alkor", and FK-30.

In 1994, research and production complex Photoprylad was created based on Photoprylad and CDB okol".

In 1995, Strela special design bureau became a part of R&PC. In 1996, R&PC "Photoprylad" started producing tank sighting systems using laser and microscopic techniques.

Since 2011, Photoprylad joined the State Concern "Ukrboronprom."

R&PC "Photoprylad" includes design bureau Sokol and special design bureau Strela. From 2012 to 2014 Photoprylad was headed by Gordiienko V. (chief constructor). At the end of 2014 he was replaced by Korevo G. (ex-general director of Izium State-Owned Instrument-Making Plant,) .

Photoprylad is situated on 2 large industrial sites of 210 thousand square meters and about 1000 employees. R&PC cooperates with Eastern and European countries. On 20 October 2014 President of Ukraine Petro Poroshenko announced that Photoprylad was included into programs of state order during 2015, producing night vision googles and thermal imagers for ATO soldiers.

== Products ==
R&PC produces both defense and civil products.
