= Myachkovo =

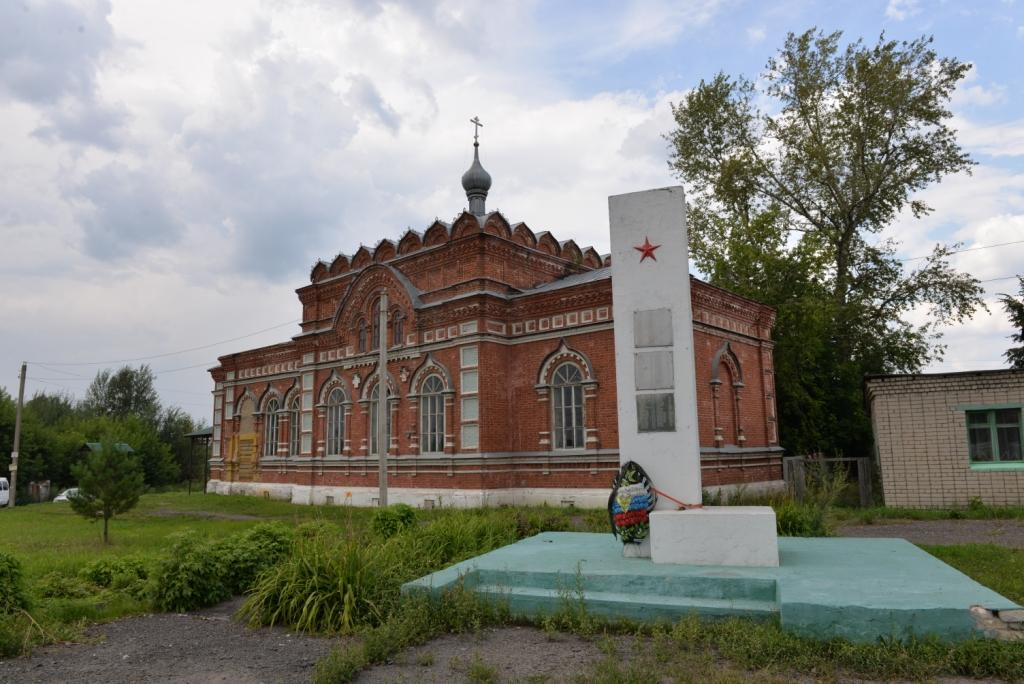
A temple in Myachkovo.

Myachkovo (Russian: Мячково) is the name of several rural localities in Russia.

- Myachkovo, Kaluga Oblast, a village in Babyninsky District of Kaluga Oblast
- Myachkovo, Moscow Oblast, a selo in Raduzhnoye Rural Settlement of Kolomensky District in Moscow Oblast
- Myachkovo, Nizhny Novgorod Oblast, a selo in Ilyinsky Selsoviet of Volodarsky District in Nizhny Novgorod Oblast
- Myachkovo, Novgorod Oblast, a village in Gorskoye Settlement of Soletsky District in Novgorod Oblast
- Myachkovo, Pskov Oblast, a village in Dedovichsky District of Pskov Oblast
- Myachkovo, Vladimir Oblast, a selo in Alexandrovsky District of Vladimir Oblast
