= Spetstechnoexport =

Ukrainian state-owned foreign trade enterprise

The State Foreign Trade Enterprise "SpetsTechnoExport"
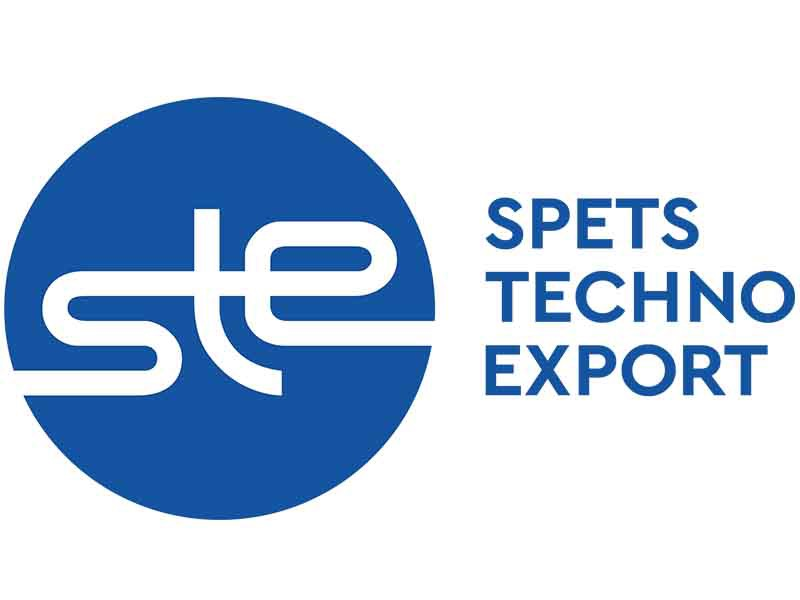
- Company type: State Enterprise
- Industry: Defense Industry
- Headquarters: Kyiv, Ukraine
- Owner: Government of Ukraine
- Parent: Ukroboronprom
- Website: spetstechnoexport.com

State Foreign Trade Enterprise ”SpetsTechnoExport” (STE), based in Kyiv (Ukraine), is the second-largest Ukrainian state-owned foreign trade enterprise by turnover, which specializes in export and import of military and dual-purpose products and services globally, as well as on promoting innovations and military-technical cooperation.

== Overview ==
The company was founded by the Government of Ukraine in July 1998. In 2010 it was incorporated to the State Concern Ukroboronprom.

The company specializes on export and import of weapons, military products and technologies as well as special purpose equipment. Estimating the gross income and foreign exchange flow in the country, SpetsTechnoExport is the second largest special exporter in Ukraine.

The company represents Ukrainian military manufacturers abroad (around 100 state-owned enterprises and 70 private producers). 35 research centers and design bureaus, public and private companies from more than 30 countries are among the partners of the company. The company's permanent partners are the Republic of India, Algeria, Indonesia, Malaysia, Bangladesh, Poland and Turkey.

One of its most important contracts was a $400 million deal with the Indian Ministry of Defense to provide 40 Ukrainian AN-32RE aircraft. In November 2015 it handed over the final batch to Indian Air Force.

== New dimensions ==
Since 2014, the company has been supplying the spare parts to Ukrainian factories outside Ukraine. It has also been modernizing Soviet-style armored vehicles.

SpetsTechnoExport has produced Ukrainian military drones. In 2015 “SpetsTechnoExport” presented 5 domestically produced models of drones systems to the President of Ukraine - «Patriot RV010», «Observer-S», «A1 With Fury», «Columba» and «Sparrow». The company also became the first to obtain the license to import US military equipment to Ukraine.

In 2016, the company developed the unmanned ground vechile known as “The Phantom”.

== Heads ==
Directors of the company since 2015:

- 2015–2018 Pavlo Barbul
- 2018–2019 Vladyslav Belbas

== Mission ==
- Strengthening the credibility of Ukraine abroad as a country with a high technological potential.
- Improving the quality of the Ukrainian army weapons.
- Boosting investments in creation of new samples of weapons and military equipment in Ukraine.
