= Antonov An-30 =

Aerial survey aircraft

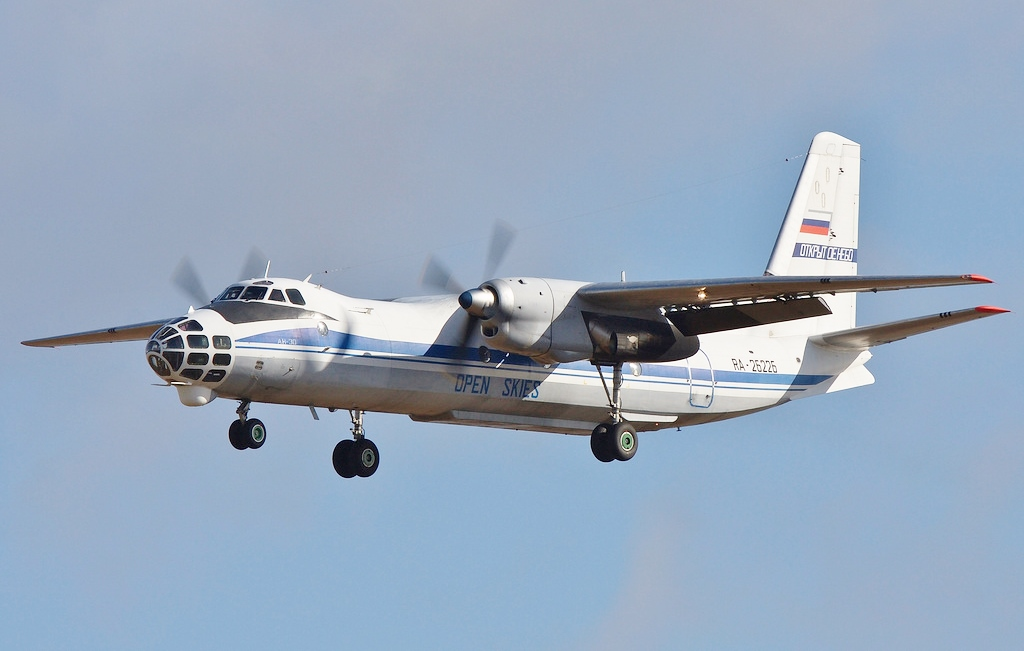

General information
- Type: Aerial cartography, reconnaissance and transport
- Manufacturer: Antonov
- Designer: Beriev
- Status: In limited service
- Primary users: Russian Air Force Ukrainian Air Force; People's Liberation Army Air Force; Romanian Air Force
- Number built: 123

History
- Manufactured: 1971–1980
- Introduction date: July 1968
- First flight: 21 August 1967
- Developed from: Antonov An-24

The Antonov An-30 (NATO reporting name: Clank, nicknamed Nastia in the USSR), is a variant of the An-24 designed for aerial cartography developed in the Soviet Union. It is the second member of the Antonov An-24 family, succeeding the An-24, while preceding the An-26, An-32 and cancelled An-132.

== Development ==
The first aerial survey version of the Antonov An-24 was designed by the Beriev OKB and designated An-24FK. The FK stood for fotokartograficheskiy (photo mapping). The prototype was converted from a production An-24A at Beriev's No. 49 construction shop during 1966. The An-24FK made its first flight on 21 August 1967, with state acceptance trials being completed in 1970 and civil certification completed in 1974. Redesignated An-30, production began in 1971 at the Antonov factory. 123 production An-30s were manufactured between 1971 and 1980 in Kiev in two main versions.

=== Total production ===
Total Production	1979	1978	1977	1976	1975	1974	1973
124	8	13	27	24	27	17	8

== Design ==
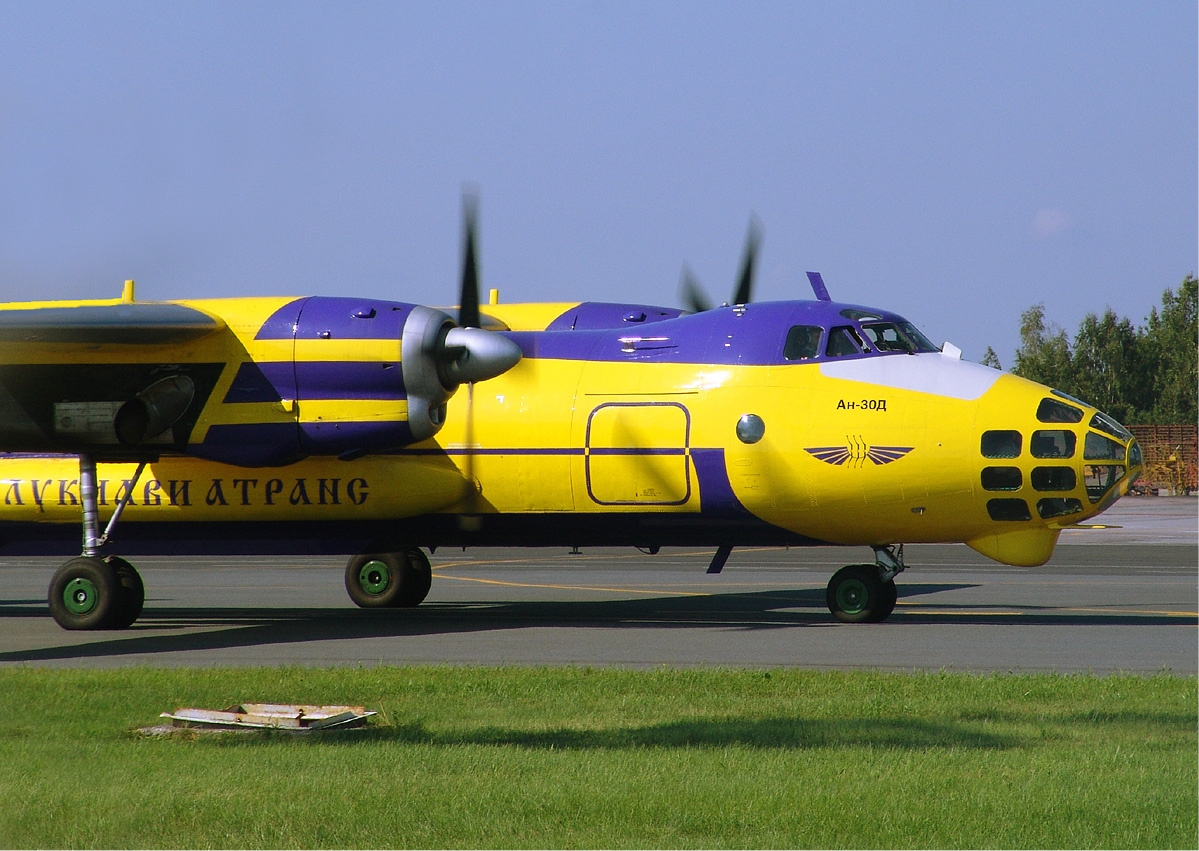
Lukaviatrans An-30A

The Antonov An-30 is a derivative of the An-24, fitted with an entirely new fuselage forward of frame 11. The fuselage nose is extensively glazed. Housed within the new nose section are the navigator and precise navigational equipment, including an optical sight for ensuring accuracy of aerial photography. To enable accurate and repeatable survey flights, standard equipment for the An-30 included computer flight path control technology. This additional equipment replaced the radar on the An-24. The positioning of the new navigational equipment required the flightdeck to be raised by 41 cm in comparison to the An-24, giving the aircraft its other main feature, a hump containing the cockpit.

The radio operator and flight engineer sat in the first cabin aft of and below the flightdeck. The mission equipment was located further aft, in a cabin featuring five camera windows in the floor. Each camera window could be closed with covers to protect the glass panels. The covers were located in special fairings protruding from the fuselage underside. In the normal aerial photography role, four or five cameras were carried aboard. Three cameras were mounted vertically, intended for mapping purposes. The remaining two cameras were pointed at an angle of 28° on each side of the aircraft, for oblique photography. The same fuselage compartment contained workstations for two camera operators and a crew rest area.

The aircraft's cameras could be used between 2,000 and 7,000 m (6,500 and 23,000 ft) and the scale of the resultant photographs was between 1:200,000 and 1:15,000,000. The aircraft was supplied with four or five cameras.

The An-30 was powered by two Ivchenko AI-24VT turboprops with a takeoff rating of 2,820 ehp.

== Operational history ==
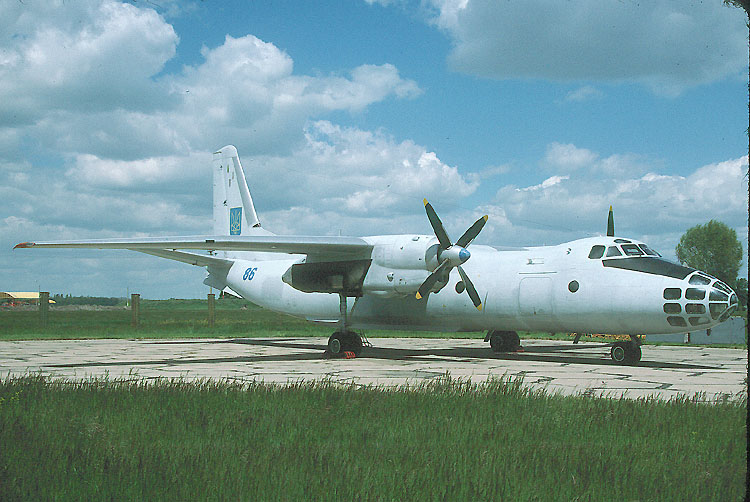
Ukrainian An-30 Ukrainian Air Force

In addition to its principal use as a survey aircraft, it has also been used by Bulgaria, Czech Republic, Romania, Russia and Ukraine to carry out surveillance under the Open Skies Treaty.

The An-30 has also been used as a weather control aircraft as the An-30M. Some have been fitted with frozen tanks of carbon dioxide to be ejected into the sky to form artificial rain clouds. These An-30s have also been put to use to avoid crop-damaging hailstorms and also to maintain good weather for, as examples, new airplane maiden flights, important parades like 1 May and the 850th anniversary of Moscow in September 1997.

Between 1971 and 1980 a total of 115 aircraft were built and 23 were sold abroad to Afghanistan, Bulgaria, China, Cuba, Czechoslovakia, Mongolia and Vietnam.

An-30s completely mapped Afghanistan in 1982, with one shot down by a MANPADS during an aerial photography flight in the Kabul area south of the Panjshir Valley on 11 March 1985. Cuban An-30s saw active service in Angola in 1987.

On 22 April 2014, a Ukrainian An-30 was hit by pro-Russian separatists' small-arms fire while on a surveillance mission over the town of Sloviansk in eastern Ukraine. The plane landed safely with minor damage. On 6 June 2014, a Ukrainian An-30B was shot down near the city of Slavyansk in eastern Ukraine, reportedly by a MANPADS fired by local separatists.

== Accidents ==
- On 11 March 1985, an Antonov An-30 of the Soviet Air Force was on an aerial photography flight in the Kabul area south of the Panjshir Valley. Upon returning to Kabul International Airport, the aircraft was struck by a Strela missile. The captain tried to make an emergency landing at Bagram Airbase but was too high. A fire ignited by the missile strike then reached the aileron controls causing the pilots to lose control; three of the five crew members evacuated the aircraft safely, but the other two crew members died.
- On 23 May 2012, a Russian Open Skies An-30 caught fire during an emergency landing at an airport outside the Czech town of Čáslav. According to unconfirmed reports, the accident occurred because the crew were unable to extend the landing gear. Seven passengers were injured, out of 14 Russian and nine Czech citizens on board.
- On 3 October 2018, a Sudan Air Force An-30 crashed while landing at Khartoum airport.
- On 22 June 2022, an An-30 operated by Region 98 LLC crashed southeast of Olenyok Airport, at 68°26′28.2″N 112°48′41.4″E. Three of the seven occupants were injured.

== Variants ==
An-24FK
The sole prototype converted from an An-24B with a navigator's station in an extensively glazed nose and elevated cockpit to give clearance for mission equipment.

An-30A
Version designed for civilian aviation. 65 were delivered to the Soviet Ministry of Civil Aviation, six to other Soviet civil organisations. 18 An-30As were built for export, seven of which were delivered to China.

An-30B
Version designed for the Soviet Air Force. 26 built. Main differences from An-30A was the avionics fit. Most An-30Bs were retrofitted with chaff/flare dispensers.

An-30D Sibiryak
Long-range version of the An-30A with increased fuel capacity, developed in 1990. Five aircraft were converted to An-30Ds. All were based at Myachkovo airfield near Moscow. This variant was used for ice monitoring, fisheries monitoring and as a transport aircraft. It had improved communication equipment, including a data-link system. Rescue equipment was also carried on board.

An-30FG
Czech designation for the single Czech Air Force An-30, after being retrofitted with a western weather radar.

An-30M Meteozashchita
Version equipped for weather research. It can spray dry ice into the atmosphere for weather control duties. The dry ice was stored in eight containers per 130 kg instead of the photographic equipment.

An-30R
A production An-30 CCCP-30055/RA-30055(c/n1101) converted to an NBC reconnaissance aircraft with air-sampling pods under the forward fuselage and other sensors for monitoring nuclear, biological and chemical warfare by-products. A second example, 30080, was acquired by the VVS, and had a single sampling pod on the port pylon and provision for dropping large flare bombs from the starboard pylon. An-30R RA-30055 was used for monitoring the plume from the Chernobyl No.4 nuclear reactor fire and became permanently radioactive in the process, being withdrawn from use immediately afterwards.

== Operators ==
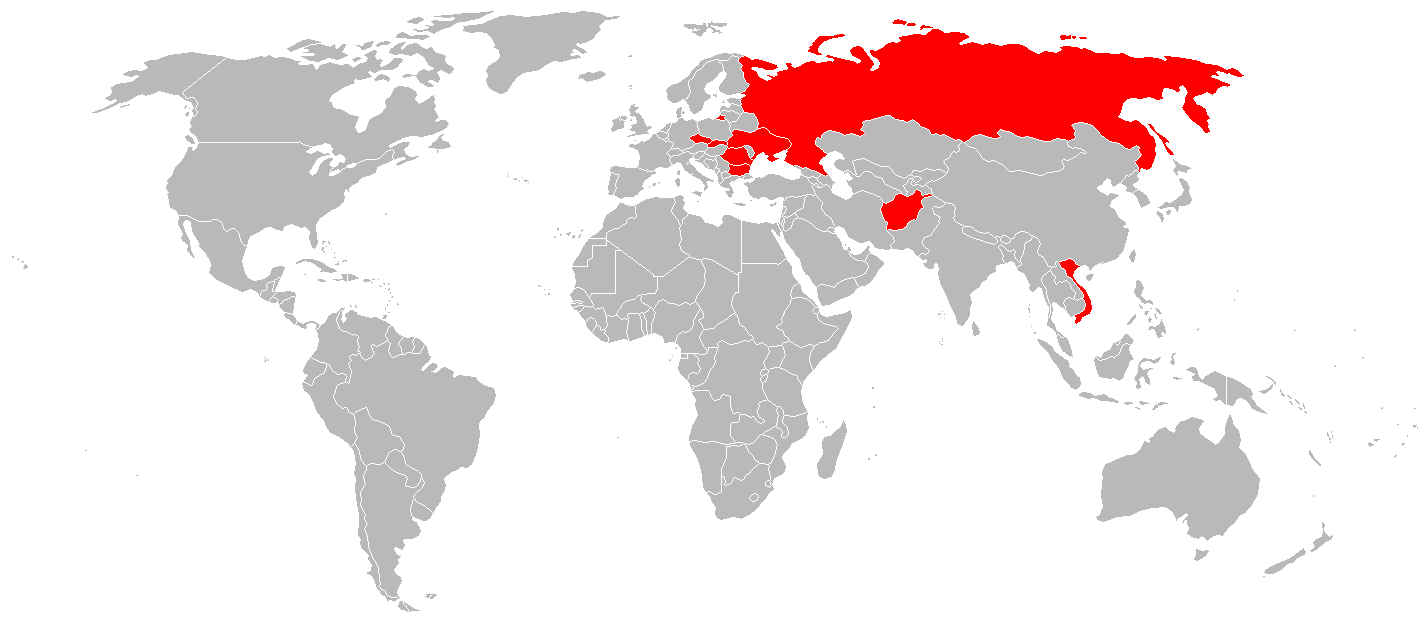
Military An-30 operators

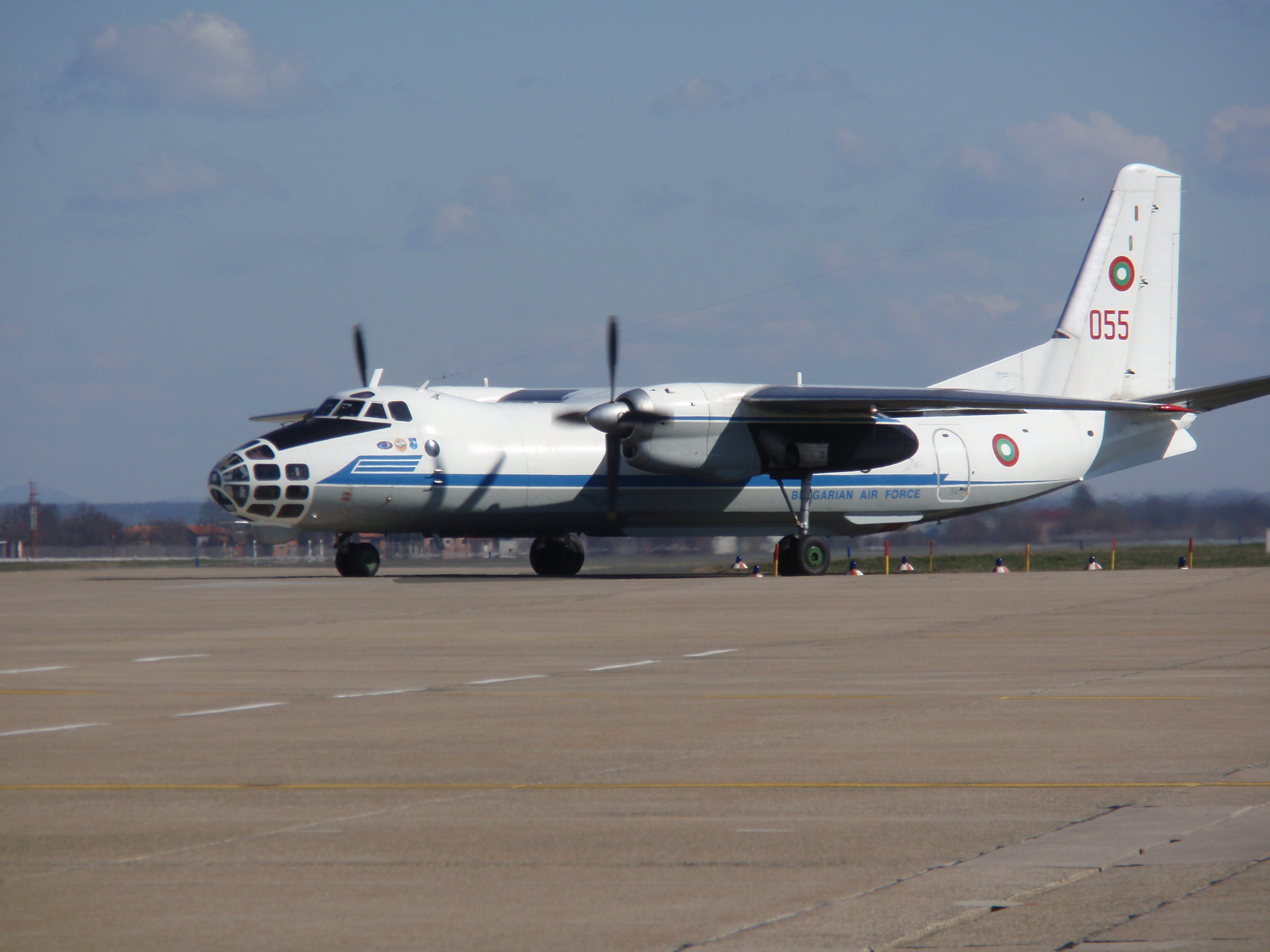
Bulgarian Air Force An-30

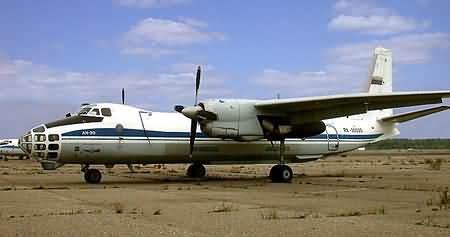
An-30 aircraft

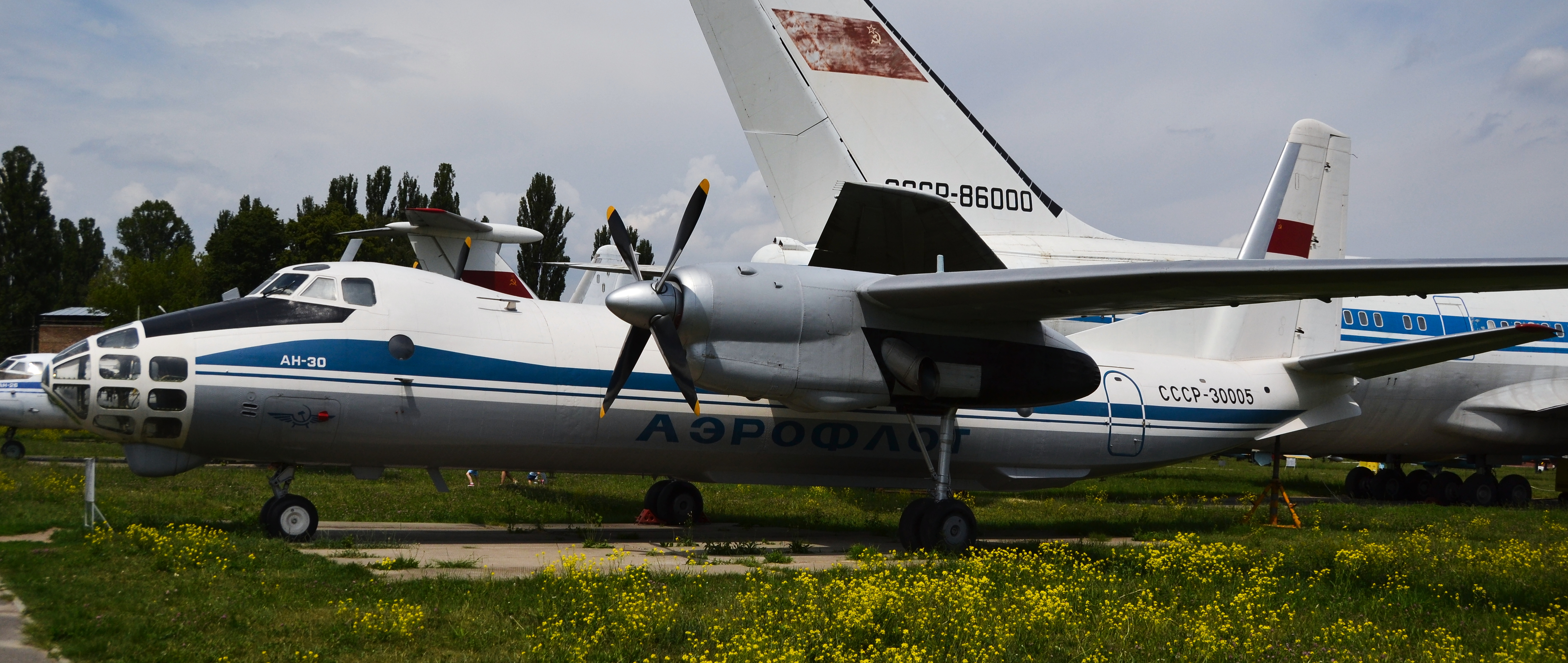
Ex-Soviet Antonov An-30 at the Ukrainian State Aviation Museum

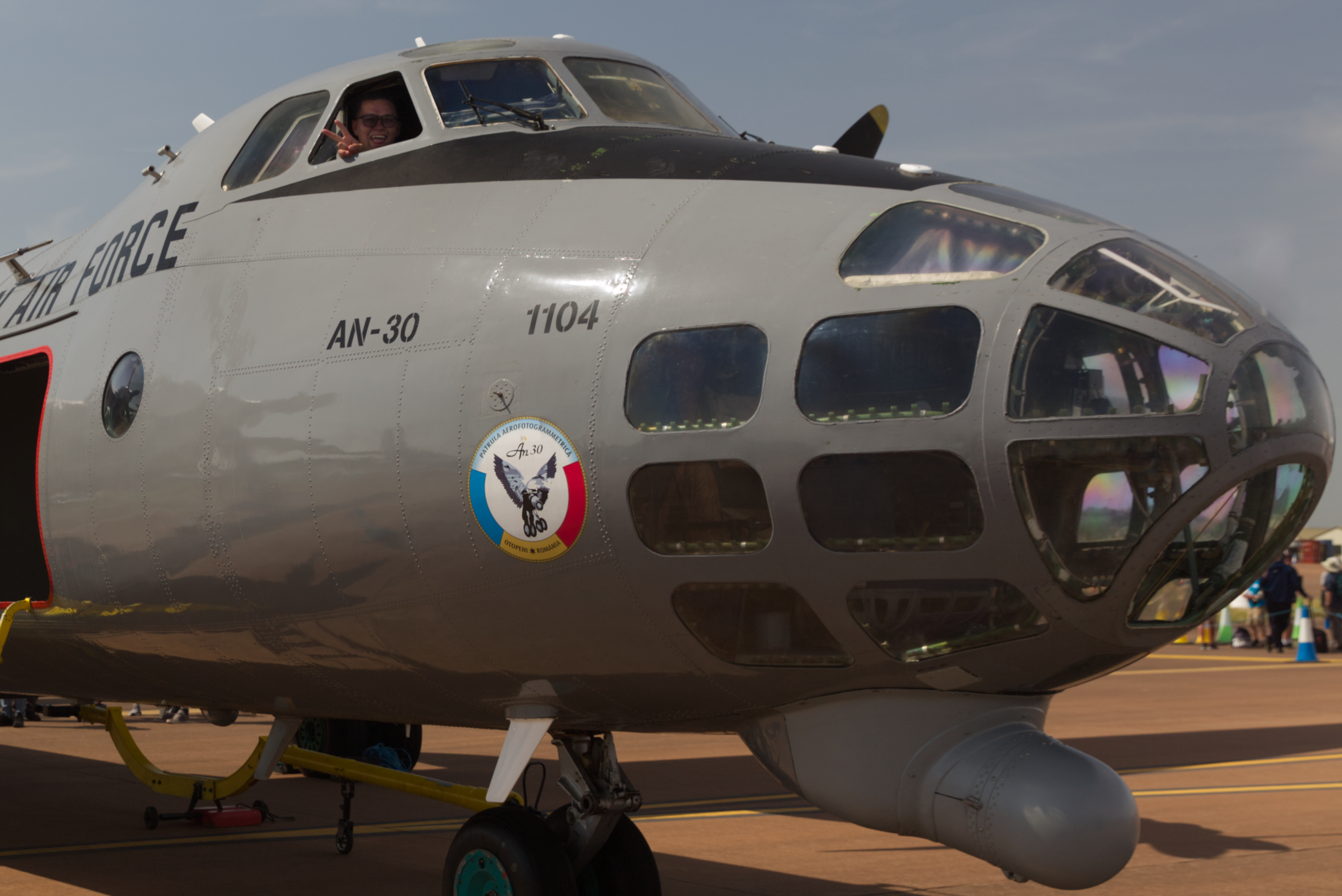
Nose section of a Romanian An-30 with an upgraded sensor

=== Military operators ===
Bulgaria

- Bulgarian Air Force – one (as of 2017)

Romania

- Romanian Air Force – three operated from 1976; currently two (as of 2017)

Russia

- Russian Aerospace Forces

Sudan

- Sudanese Air Force

Ukraine

- Ukrainian Air Force – three (as of 2017)

==== Former military operators ====
Afghanistan

- Afghan Air Force received an An-30 in 1985.

Angola

- Angolan Air Force

Cuba

- Cuban Air Force

Czech Republic

- Czech Air Force retired their An-30 in 2003.

Czechoslovakia

- Czechoslovak Air Force

Mongolia

- Mongolian Air Force

China

- People's Liberation Army Air Force

Soviet Union

- Soviet Air Force

Vietnam

- Vietnam People's Air Force

=== Civil operators ===
Congo

- Aero-Fret

==== Former civil operators ====
China

- CAAC Airlines

Mongolia

- MIAT Mongolian Airlines

Russia

- Moskovia Airlines
- Lukiaviatrans
- Myachkovo Air Services
- Novosibirsk Air Enterprise
- Polet Flight
- Practical Geodinamics Center

Ukraine

- ARP 410 Airlines
- Ukraine National Airlines

Vietnam

- Vietnam Air Service Company

== Specifications (An-30) ==
Data from Jane's All The World's Aircraft 1988–89

General characteristics

- Crew: 7
- Length: 24.26 m (79 ft 7 in)
- Wingspan: 29.20 m (95 ft 10 in)
- Height: 8.32 m (27 ft 4 in)
- Wing area: 74.98 m^{2} (807.1 sq ft)
- Aspect ratio: 11.4:1
- Airfoil: root: TsAGI S-5-18; tip: TsAGI S-3-13
- Empty weight: 15,590 kg (34,370 lb)
- Max takeoff weight: 23,000 kg (50,706 lb)
- Fuel capacity: 6,200 L (1,600 US gal; 1,400 imp gal)
- Powerplant: 2 × Ivchenko AI-24TVT turboprop engines, 2,090 kW (2,803 shp) each equivalent
- Powerplant: 1 × Sojuz (Tumanskij) RU-19A-300 turbojet
- Propellers: 4-bladed constant-speed propellers

Performance

- Maximum speed: 540 km/h (340 mph, 290 kn)
- Cruise speed: 430 km/h (270 mph, 230 kn)
- Range: 2,630 km (1,630 mi, 1,420 nmi) (with no reserves)
- Service ceiling: 8,300 m (27,200 ft)
- Take-off run: 710 m (2,329 ft)
- Landing run: 670 m (2,198 ft)

Avionics
Five positions for large cameras. Other survey equipment can be fitted.

== See also ==
Related development

- Antonov An-24
- Antonov An-26
- Antonov An-32

Aircraft of comparable role, configuration, and era

- Aeritalia G.222

Related lists

- List of military aircraft of the Soviet Union and the CIS
