= Ivchenko AI-24 =

1950s Soviet turboprop aircraft engine

AI-24
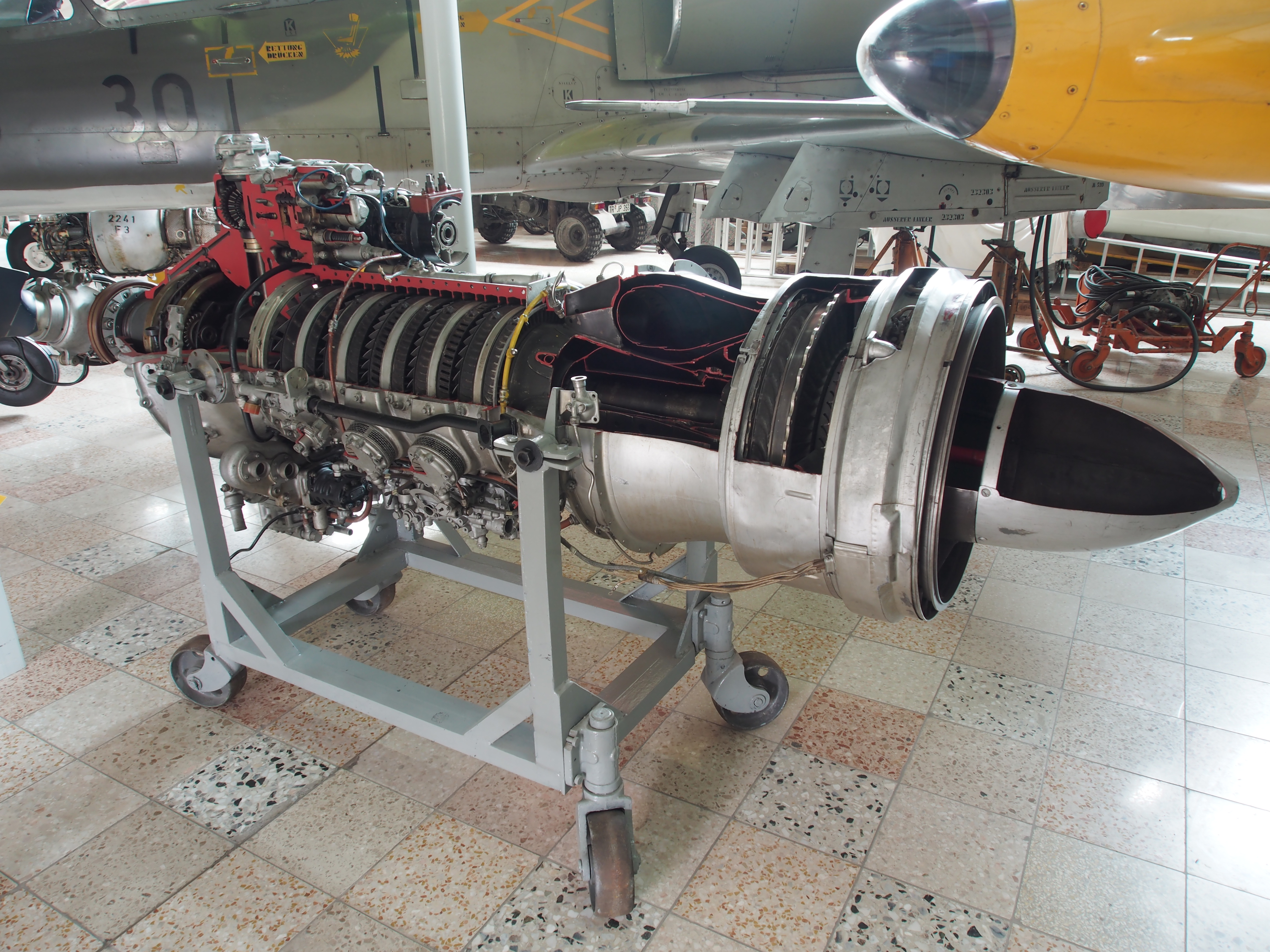
- AI-24 on display at Flugausstellung Hermeskeil
- Type: Turboprop
- National origin: Soviet Union
- Manufacturer: Ivchenko/ZMKB Progress
- First run: 1958
- Major applications: Antonov An-24; Antonov An-26; Antonov An-30

The Ivchenko AI-24 (Russian: Ивченко АИ-24) is a turboprop aircraft engine designed and developed in the late-1950s by the Ivchenko design bureau and manufactured thereafter by Motor Sich. It was designed to power Antonov's successful An-24, An-26 and An-30 aircraft series.

== Design and development ==
In 1958, based on the experience gained in the course of designing the AI-20 turboprop engine and using advanced methods of simulation, a scaled-down turboprop engine, AI-24, rated at 2,550 hp (1,900 kW) (equivalent) was developed. The engine was specifically designed to power the Antonov An-24 passenger aircraft. True to the Soviet tradition, design was kept separate from serial production which was started in 1960. The turboprop engine along with many of the bureau's other designs were manufactured at Motor Sich which is also located in Zaporozhye, Ukraine.

Attempts were made to also produce a turboshaft variant - for instance in 1960, eleven pre-production units of AI-24V turboshaft variants rated at 2000 hp were manufactured for powering the first two V-8 (Mi-8) prototype helicopters. However, later on, due to the fact that the TV2-117 engine was selected for powering the Mi-8, the works on the AI-24V engine aborted.

The AI-24A produced 1,900 kW (2,550 shp).

An improved series was introduced in 1966.

Each engine nacelle included a fire extinguishing system that could be set to an automatic operation mode. The AI-24 turboprop engines featured wide gas dynamic stability margin at all power conditions, altitudes and flight speeds. The most notable feature of the engine was in its operational reliability. The main advantages of the engine were simple design, high reliability, long service life and easy maintainability.

The later AI-24T had water injection giving increased power output. It also introduced automatic limiting of power overloads and exhaust gas temperatures, along with vibration monitoring, automatic shutdown and feathering.

== Operational use ==
The first airplane powered by two Ivchenko AI-24 turboprops was the An-24. They drove four-bladed AV-72T constant-speed reversible propellers. Early production aircraft had AI-24 engines providing 1,790 kW (2,400 shp) takeoff power each, while later production airplanes were equipped with the newer AI-24A engines.

The AI-24 was later used on the Аn-26 and Аn-30 transports.

The AI-24A was manufactured in large numbers in both the USSR and China. The popularity and success of Antonov's An-24 series ensured that the AI-24 turboprop engine became one of the Soviet Union's most prominent and widely distributed engines worldwide. According to SE Ivchenko Progress, 2735 airplanes and 11750 units of the AI-24 engines of various modified versions were manufactured in total before production ended.

== Variants ==
AI-24
Initial production variant producing 1,790 kW (2,400 shp) maximum takeoff power.
AI-24A
Later Production variant with performance maintained in hot-and-high conditions. maximum takeoff power 1,875 kW (2,515 ehp).
AI-24T
Uprated variant which produced 2,103 kW (2,820 ehp) takeoff power for greater payload capability.
AI-24VT
Uprated variant produced 2,100 kW (2,820 shp) differentiated because it was coupled with an RU19A-300 APU/booster instead of the regular TG-16M auxiliary power unit (APU) turbine. It is mainly used to power the An-26.

== Specifications (AI-24T) ==
Data from Aircraft engines of the World 1970

==== General characteristics ====
- Type: Single-shaft turboprop with water injection
- Length: 2,436 mm (95.9 in)
- Diameter: 360 mm (14 in) (intake)
- Frontal area: 0.1 m^{2} (1.1 sq ft)
- Dry weight: 600 kg (1,300 lb)

==== Components ====
- Compressor: 10-stage axial
- Combustors: Annular combustion chamber with 8 flame tubes
- Turbine: 3-stage axial
- Fuel type: Aviation Kerosene / JP-1 or similar
- Oil system: pressure spray at 4.4 bar (64 psi)

==== Performance ====
- Maximum power output: 2,100 kW (2,800 shp) equivalent at 15,100 rpm with water injection and flat-rated to 11,500 ft (3,500 m) for take-off, (1,900 kW (2,500 shp) + 2.57 kN (578 lbf)).
- Overall pressure ratio: 7.05:1
- Air mass flow: 14.4 kg/s (1,900 lb/min)
- Turbine inlet temperature: 823 K (550 °C)
- Specific fuel consumption: 0.533 lb/(hp⋅h) (0.324 kg/kWh)
- Thrust-to-weight ratio: 3.52 kW/kg (2.14 hp/lb) (equivalent)
