= Ivchenko AI-9 =

1960s Soviet aircraft auxiliary power unit

AI-9
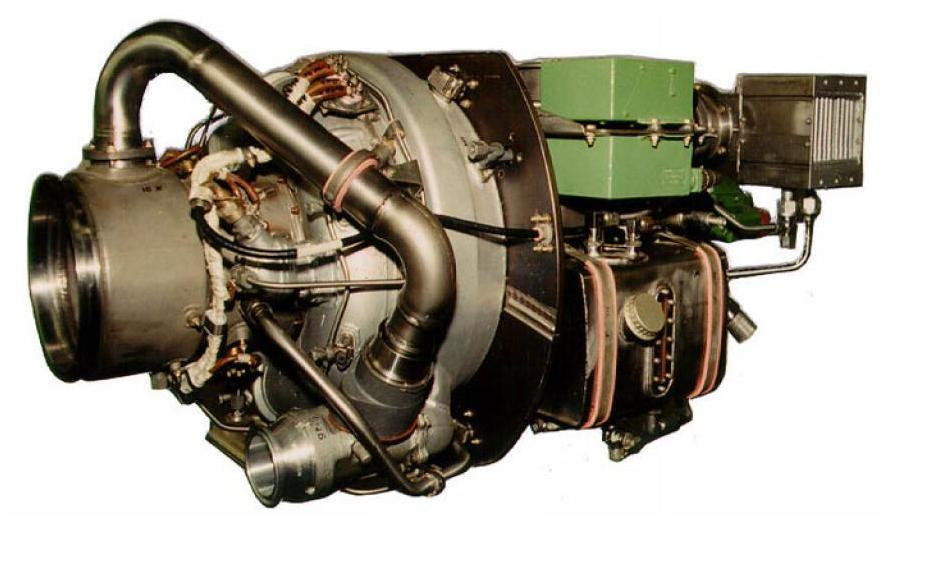
- AI9-3B
- Type: Auxiliary Power Unit (APU)
- National origin: USSR
- Manufacturer: Ivchenko / Ivchenko-Progress / Motor Sich
- First run: 1966
- Major applications: Antonov An-140; Kamov Ka-27; Kamov Ka-28; Kamov Ka-29; Kamov Ka-32; Kamov Ka-50; Kamov Ka-52; Mil Mi-8; Mil Mi-14; Mil Mi-24; Mil Mi-28; Yakovlev Yak-40

The Ivchenko AI-9 (Russian: Ивченко АИ-9) is an aircraft auxiliary power unit developed and produced by Ivchenko-Progress and Motor Sich.

== Variants ==
AI-9
The base model which is used to supply compressed air to air-start systems. It can also be used as cabin heating if necessary.
AI-9V
A variant of the base model that is used to supply compressed air to air-start systems and air conditioning. It also supplies electricity to on-board electrical systems with a 3 kW generator.
AI9-3B
The AI9-3B is used to provide air to engines and air conditioning systems and provide electricity to on-board electrical systems.

== Specifications (AI-9) ==
Data from Aircraft engines of the World 1970

==== General characteristics ====
- Type: Auxiliary Power Unit (APU)
- Length: 740 mm (29 in)
- Diameter: 500 mm (20 in) casing diameter
- Dry weight: 45 kg (99 lb)

==== Components ====
- Compressor: 1-stage centrifugal compressor
- Combustors: Annular combustion chamber with 6 fuel injectors
- Turbine: 1-stage axial turbine (gas generator)
- Fuel type: Aviation Kerosene such as JP-4

==== Performance ====
- Maximum power output: 56 kW (75 hp) (air hp) at 38,500 rpm or 0.4 kg/s (53 lb/min) of compressed air at 2.4 bar (35 psi)
- Overall pressure ratio: 2.8:1
- Air mass flow: 1.5 kg/s (200 lb/min) at 38,500 rpm
- Fuel consumption: 120 kg/h (260 lb/h) maximum
- Power-to-weight ratio: 1.23 kW/kg (0.75 hp/lb) (air hp)
