= Myachkovo, Vladimir Oblast =

Myachkovo Мячково
- Selo
- Location within Vladimir Oblast Location within Russia
- Coordinates: 56°20′N 39°03′E
- Country: Russia
- Region: Vladimir Oblast
- District: Alexandrovsky District
- Time zone: UTC+3:00

Myachkovo (Russian: Мя́чково) is a rural locality (a selo) in Andreyevskoye Rural Settlement, Alexandrovsky District, Vladimir Oblast, Russia. The population was 58 as of 2010.

== Geography ==
Myachkovo is located 29 km east of Alexandrov (the district's administrative centre) by road. Bunkovo is the nearest rural locality.
