= Ukrainian Defense Industry =

Ukrainian state-owned defense conglomerate

- Trade name: Ukroboronprom
- Native name: Українська оборонна промисловість
- Type: Joint stock company
- Industry: Defense industry conglomerate
- Founded: December 2010; 15 years ago
- Headquarters: Kyiv, Ukraine
- Area served: Worldwide
- Key people: Oleh Huliak (Director General)
- Products: Munitions, small arms, artillery, explosives, combat vehicles, warships, civil and military aerospace products, engines, missiles, electro-optical devices, CBRN defense equipment
- Revenue: 1.3 billion $ (2018)
- Net income: 28.3 billion ₴ (2016)
- Number of employees: 54,000
- Website: ukroboronprom.com.ua/en

Ukrainian Defense Industry, also known as Ukroboronprom, is the largest arms manufacturer in Ukraine and one of the 50 largest companies in the global arms industry. The company has relocated parts of its production abroad since the 2022 Russian invasion of Ukraine.

The conglomerate includes enterprises that operate in the development, manufacture, sale, repair, modernization and disposal of weapons, military and special equipment and ammunition, and participating in military-technical cooperation with foreign states.

As of 2025 corporatization continues.

== History ==
Ukroboronprom was created in 2010 by presidential and ministerial decrees.

In September 2013, Ukroboronprom was structured into five divisions: aircraft industry and aircraft maintenance; precision weaponry and munition; armoured vehicles, automotive equipment, engineering and special equipment; shipbuilding and marine facilities; radar, radio communications and air defense systems.

In 2016 Ukroboronprom signed a memorandum of cooperation with the former head of the Agency for Defence Advanced Research Projects (DARPA) Anthony Tetter. He became an advisor on the long-term development of the conglomerate.

Ukroboronprom was the first among Ukrainian industrial giants to launch a system of e-procurement, officially started in October 2014. The conglomerate claims they saved US$304.8 million in 2015, and in 2016 – ₴476.6 million.

Ukroboronprom increased its production and began to provide Ukraine's Armed Forces with modernized weaponry. In 2017, Ukroboronprom completed the State Defence Order and conveyed 3,673 units of weapons and equipment to the security agencies of the country, including 2,053 new and upgraded ones.

For 2014–2017, Ukroboronprom rose by 14 positions – from 91 to 77th place – in the SIPRI world ranking of arms manufacturers.

Ukroboronprom together with the American company Delphi Corporation has launched a new enterprise "Electric Systems". It has become the official supplier of components for Mercedes products.

On 12 February 2018 Roman Romanov resigned and was replaced on 21 February 2018 when the President of Ukraine appointed Pavlo Bukin as Director General. Aivaras Abromavičius succeeded him on 31 August 2019. Abromavičius was succeeded by Ihor Fomenko on 6 October 2020. Yuriy Husev was placed as General Director in December 2020.

=== Russian invasion ===
During the 2022 Russian invasion of Ukraine, Ukroboronprom repaired and maintained both Ukrainian vehicles and captured Russian vehicles. It offered US$1,000,000 to Russian pilots for every combat-capable aircraft handed over to them as well as $500,000 for every combat-capable helicopter handed over.

On 6 March 2022, Ukroboronprom's Zhytomyr Armour Plant was destroyed, with three people being killed. On 15 April, the Ukroboronprom Concern Vizar Plant was struck with several sea-based long-range missiles. The plant produced R-360 Neptune cruise missiles for the Armed Forces of Ukraine and is believed that the strike was reprisal for the sinking of the Russian warship Moskva by two Neptune missiles.

On 20 September, it was announced that Ukroboronprom and an unspecified NATO member country were to build a factory for the production of ammunition that will be held to NATO standards.

On 17 October, following the October 2022 Russian missile strikes on Ukrainian targets, Ukroboronprom and the Come Back Alive Foundation independently announced the preparations of a weapon that could "create explosions in Moscow" with a range of up to 1000 kilometres and equipped with a 75 kilogram warhead. It was later revealed that the weapon was an unmanned aerial vehicle and is rumored to be responsible for several attacks on Russian military infrastructure in Saratov, Ryazan, and Kursk.

On 15 March 2023, Ukroboronprom, with the help of a NATO country, started manufacturing 125 mm smoothbore ammunition for Ukraine's Soviet era tanks outside of Ukraine. Along with existing production of 120 mm mortar rounds, 122 mm and 152 mm artillery shells. A part of a larger effort by Ukraine to manufacture ammunition as Western donors feel the "pinch" in their own stockpiles. Ten employees have been killed thus far during the war. Production sites have had to be dispersed to avoid destruction. The company spokesperson said that "The emergence of this shell is the first product of our joint cooperation with a country from the (NATO) alliance. It will not end with shells, we will soon show you other products produced with partner countries,"

On 21 March 2023 the Cabinet of Ministers of Ukraine renamed Ukroboronprom to Ukrainska oboronna promyslovist (Ukrainian Defense Industry).

On 6 April, Ukroboronprom announced that it would start manufacturing 125mm tank rounds with Polish state defence company Polska Grupa Zbrojeniowa. This agreement means that Poland will become the second NATO country helping Ukraine manufacture Soviet-era shells. The first is an unidentified Central European NATO member.

On 21 June, Ukroboronprom claimed to have built a drone with a 1000-km range. Whether used in an operation or just tested it was not clear. Ukraine said in autumn 2022 that the weapon it was developing would have a 75-kg warhead.

According to European Pravda, Ukroboronprom would be headed by Herman Smetanin from 28 June 2023.

== General background ==
The conglomerate was established in 2010 in place of the existing "Armoured Equipment of Ukraine" (1999) and "Technological Military Service".

In 2014 the conglomerate included 134 enterprises of the military–industrial complex of Ukraine and employed some 120,000 people. In 2012 eighteen of those companies were to be reorganized (Resolution #223, March 21, 2012). They included:

- Kharkiv Morozov Machine-Building Design Bureau
- Kharkiv Engine Building Design Bureau
- Ship Building Research Project Center
- Shostka State Factory "Zirka" (Star)
- Science Producing Complex "Iskra" (Spark)
- Chemical State Association of Petrovsky
- others

According to the company, China and India are a traditional market for Ukrainian military products. In 2013, the Brazilian Navy announced a potential partnership with Ukroboronprom.

In March 2014, after the annexation of Crimea by the Russian Federation, the company barred all exports of weaponry and military equipment to Russia.

== Structure ==
The state-owned conglomerate consists of 134 military industry enterprises of Ukraine (123 state enterprises and 9 joint stock corporations, with the profits participation rights delegated to the management of Ukroboronprom).

=== Manufacturing and design sector ===
==== Armored vehicles, artillery armament, automotive, and special engineering equipment ====
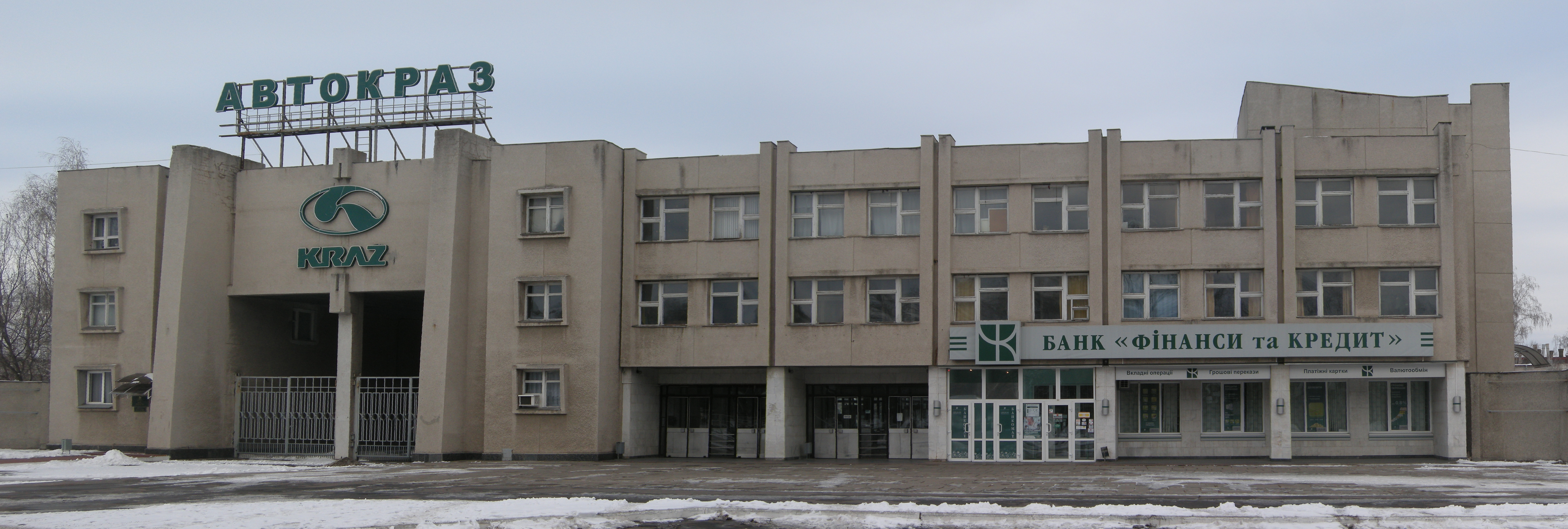
Kremenchuk Automobile Plant

- "Artyleriyske Ozbroyennia" (Artillery Weaponry) Design Bureau (Kyiv)
- 45th Experimental Mechanical Factory (Vinnytsia)
- Donetsk Treasury Factory of Chemicals (Donetsk)
- Feodosiya Optical Factory (Feodosiya, Autonomous Republic of Crimea)
- Izyum Device Manufacturing Factory (Izyum)
- Kharkiv Plant of Special Vehicles (Kharkiv)
- Kharkiv Plant of Transporting Equipment (Kharkiv)
- Kharkiv Design Bureau of Engine Manufacturing (Kharkiv)
- Kharkiv Automobile Plant (Kharkiv)
- Kharkiv Armored Vehicle Plant (Kharkiv)
- Kharkiv Mechanical Plant (Kharkiv)
- Malyshev Factory (Kharkiv)
  - Kharkiv Morozov Machine Building Design Bureau (Kharkiv)
- Kyiv Automobile Repair Plant (Kyiv)
- Kyiv Armored Vehicle Plant (Kyiv)
- Kremenchuk Automobile Plant KrAZ (Kremenchuk)
- Lviv Armored Vehicle Plant (Lviv)
- "Mayak" Factory (Kyiv)
- Mykolaiv Armored Vehicle Plant (Mykolaiv)
- Nizhyn Repair Factory of Military Engineering Vehicles (Nizhyn)
- Research and Production Complex "Photoprylad" (Photo-device) (Cherkasy)
- Rivne Automobile Repair Plant (Rivne)
- Shepetivka Repair Factory (Shepetivka)
- Ukrainian State Research Institute of Structural Materials "Prometei" (Mariupol)
- Science and Technology Complex "Zavod Tochnoyi Mekhaniky" (Precise Mechanics Factory) (Kamianets-Podilskyi)
- Zaporizhzhia Engineering Design Bureau of Academician Ivchenko "Prohres" (Progress) (Zaporizhzhia)
- Zhytomyr Armored Vehicle Plant (Zhytomyr)

==== Shipbuilding ====
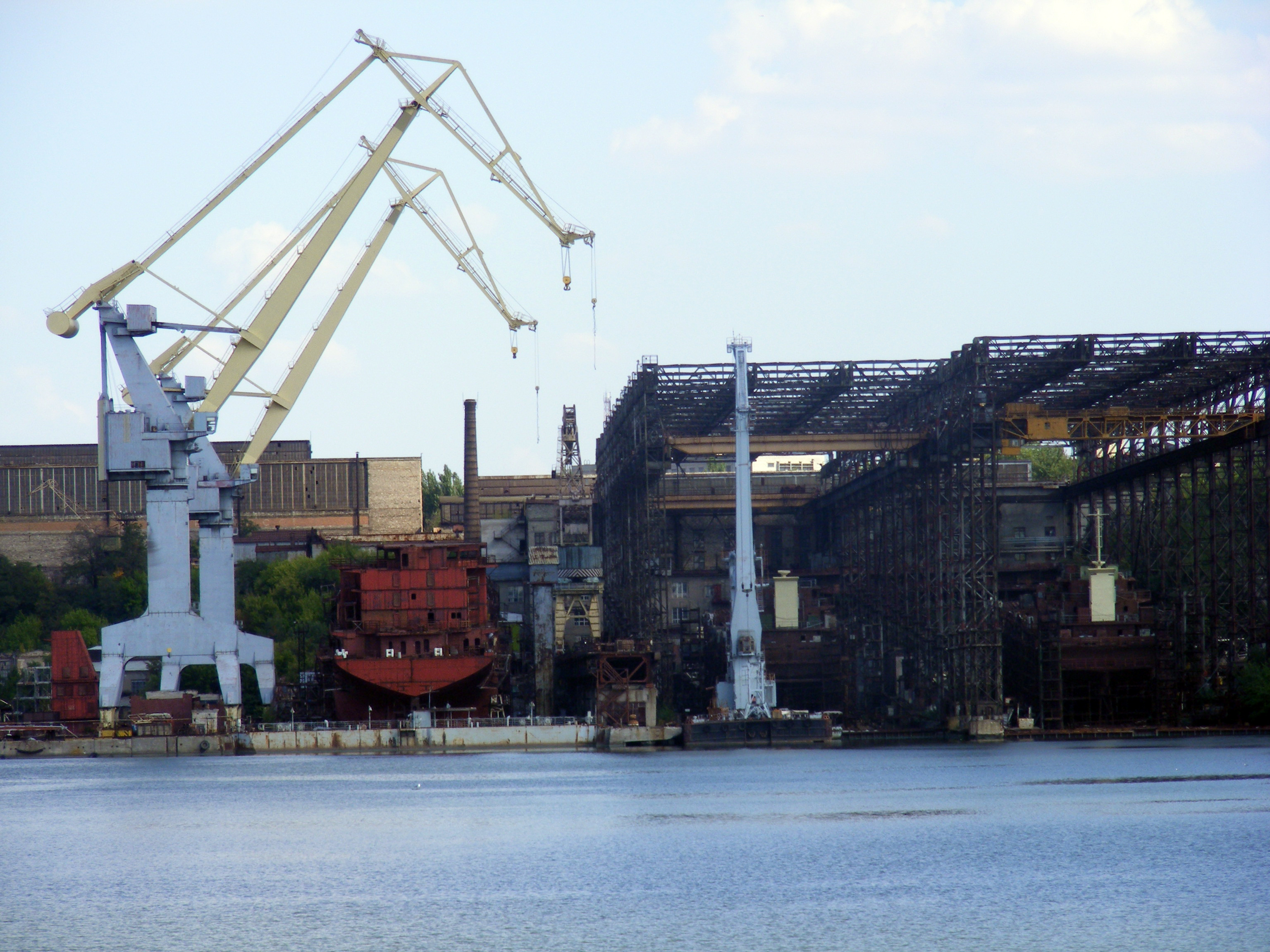
Shipbuilding Factory of 61 Communards

- Research and Production Association "Kyivskyi Zavod Avtomatyky" (Kyiv Factory of Automation) (Kyiv)
- State Research and Design Shipbuilding Center (Mykolaiv)
- Mykolayiv Shipyard (Mykolaiv)
- Kherson Factory "Palada" (Pallada) (Kherson)
- Kherson Factory "Sudmash" (Ship engineering) (Kherson)
- Central Design Bureau "Izumrud" (Emerald) (Kherson)
- Research Institute of Radiolocation Systems "Kvant-Radiolokatsiya" (Quantum-Radiolocation) (Kyiv)
- Kyiv State Factory "Burevisnyk" (Storm-petrel) (Kyiv)
- Ukrainian State Research Institute of Structural Materials "Prometei" (Mariupol)
- Research Design Bureau "Promin" (Ray) (Donetsk)
- Fiolent Factory (Felenk, Tiger) (Simferopol)
- Feodosiya Shipyards "More" (Sea) (Feodosiya)
- Skloplastyk (Plexiglass) (Feodosiya)
- Special Site of Technical Production "Polumia" (Flame) (Sevastopol)
- Design-Technology Bureau "Sudokompozyt" (Ship-composite) (Feodosiya)
- Central Design Bureau "Chonomorets" (Black Sea sailor) (Sevastopol)
- Feodosiya Ship Mechanical Factory (Feodosiya)
- "Oryzon-Navihatsiya" (Horizon-Navigation) (Smila)
- Research and Production Complex of Gas-turbine Engineering "Zoria-Mashproekt" (Dawn Engineering Project) (Mykolaiv)

==== Radiolocation, RF Signal and Air Defence systems ====
- "Rubin" (Ruby) (Uman)
- Research Institute of Radio-electronics (Kharkiv)
- Central Design Bureau "Proton" (Kharkiv)
- Zmiiv Power Engineering Repair Factory (Zmiiv)
- Balakliya Repair Factory (Balakliya)
- 2nd Repair Factory of Signal Devices (Berezhany)
- Ternopil Science Technology Company "Promin" (Ray) (Ternopil)
- Research Institute "Shtorm" (Storm) (Odesa)
- Special Design Bureau "Molniya" (Lightning) (Odesa)
- Technical Production Company "Hranit" (Granite) (Odesa)
- Southern Technical Production Company (Mykolaiv)
- Ukrainian Radio-frequency Engineering Institute (Mykolaiv)
- Lviv Research Institute of Radio-frequency Engineering (Lviv)
- Lviv Radio-frequency Repair Factory (Lviv)
- Kvant Factory (Quantum) (Kyiv)
- "Meridian" of Korolyov (Kyiv)
- Kyiv Factory "Radar" (Kyiv)
- Research Institute "Buran" (Kyiv)
- Henerator Factory (Generator) (Kyiv)
- Special Design Bureau "Spektr" (Kyiv)
- Research Institute "Kvant" (Quantum) (Kyiv)
- Science Technology Complex "Impuls" (Impulse) (Kyiv)
- Research and Production Complex "Iskra" (Spark) (Kyiv)
- Zaporizhzhia Company "Radioprylad" (Radio-frequency device) (Zaporizhzhia)
- Zhytomyr Repair Factory of Radio-frequency equipment "Promin" (Ray) (Zhytomyr)
- Research Institute of Complex Automation (Donetsk)
- Design Bureau of RF Signal (Sevastopol)
- Lviv State Factory "Lorta" (Lviv)
- Production Union "Karpaty" (Carpathians) (Ivano-Frankivsk)

==== Aircraft ====
- Antonov (Kyiv)
  - Antonov Serial Production Plant (Kyiv)
  - Kyiv Aircraft Repair Plant 410 (Kyiv)
  - Kharkiv State Aircraft Manufacturing Company (Kharkiv)
- 171st Chernihiv Repair Plant (Chernihiv)
- Chuhuiv Repair Plant (Chuhuiv)
- Mykolaiv Repair Plant "NARP" (Mykolaiv)
- Research Company "Koneks" (Lviv)
- Lviv State Aircraft Repair Plant (Lviv)
- Repair Factory of Radio-frequency Equipment (Kropyvnytskyi)
- Ukrainian Research Institute of Aviation Technology (Kyiv)
- Central Research Institute of Navigation and Administration (Kyiv)
- Design Bureau of Laser Technology (Kyiv)
- Spetsoboronmash (Kyiv, formerly "Artem" Engineering Company)
- General Aviation Design Bureau of Ukraine (Kyiv)
- Radiovymiryuvach (Kyiv)
- Zaporizhzhia Aircraft Repair Plant "MiGremont" (Zaporizhzhia)
- Zakarpattia Helicopter Producing Association (Dubove)
- Lutsk Repair Plant "Motor" (Lutsk)
- 732nd Vinnytsia Repair Plant (Vinnytsia)
- Vinnytsia Aviation Factory "ViAZ" (Vinnytsia)
- Research Center "Vertolit" (Feodosiya)
- Research Institute of Aero-Elastic Systems (Feodosiya)
- Sevastopol Aviation Company (Sevastopol)
- Yevpatoriya Aviation Repair Factory (Yevpatoriya)
- "Artem" Holding Company
- Novator (Khmelnytskyi)
- Kharkiv Engineering Factory "FED" (Kharkiv)
- Odesa Aviation Factory (Odesa)
- Krasyliv Aggregate Factory (Krasyliv)

==== High-precision armament and ammunition ====
- Shostka Treasury Factory "Zirka" (Shostka)
- Shostka Treasury Factory "Impuls" (Shostka)
- Research Institute of Chemical Products (Shostka)
- Zhulyany Engineering Factory "Vizar" (Vyshneve)
- Donetsk Factory of Chemical Products (Donetsk)
- Design Bureau "Artyleriyske Ozbroyennia" (Kyiv)
- State Kyiv Design Bureau "Luch" (Kyiv)
- Science-Production Complex "Prohres" (Nizhyn)

=== Contracts and trading ===
- Ukrspetsexport
- Spetsteknoexport

=== Other ===
- Southern Aviation Industrial Adjustment (Zaporizhzhia)
- Kharkiv Aggregate Design Bureau (Kharkiv)
- Tiachiv Factory "Zenit" (Tiachiv)
- Konotop Aircraft Repair Plant "Aviakon" (Konotop)
- Luhansk Aircraft Repair Plant (Luhansk)
- Yuzhmash (Dnipro)
- Pavlohrad Chemical Plant (Pavlohrad)
- Luhansk cartridge plant (Ukraine's only small arms ammunition manufacturer. It was captured by the Luhansk People's Republic during the War in Donbass)

== Directors General ==
- 01/2011 – 02/2012 – Dmytro Salamatin
- 02/2012 – 06/2012 – Dmytro Perehudov
- 06/2012 – 03/2014 – Serhiy Hromov
- 03/2014 – 04/2014– Serhiy Averchenko
- 04/2014 – 02/2018 – Roman Romanov
- 02/2018 – 8/2019 – Pavlo Bukin
- 8/2019–10/2020 – Aivaras Abromavičius
- 10/2020–12/2020 – Ihor Fomenko
- 12/2020–06/2023 – Yuriy Husev

== University cooperation ==
Ukroboronprom cooperates with the Central Scientific Research Institute of Armaments and Military Equipment of Armed Forces of Ukraine and leading Ukrainian universities like Kyiv-Mohyla Academy, Kyiv Polytechnic Institute, Kharkiv Polytechnic, V. N. Karazin Kharkiv National University, ME Zhukovsky KAU, Kharkiv National University of Radio Electronics and I. Kozhedub Kharkiv University of Air Force.

Best inventions of Ukrainian students are being embodied. Scientists of the Kyiv Polytechnic Institute have created a UAV. Students of other universities are actively involved in apprenticeship on the leading enterprises of Ukroboronprom.

In 2016, Ukroboronprom began to work with the best business schools in the country. In particular, the International Management Institute and Kyiv-Mohyla Business School. Senior management, management of the average level plants and industrials undergo training.

At the end of 2017 Ukroboronprom and Igor Sikorsky Kyiv Polytechnic Institute opened a new master's program "Management in the field of defence and industrial complex".

In 2017, a series of MBA curricula for Ukroboronprom specialists was completed, including a partnership with the US Thunderbird School of Global Management and the International Management Institute in Kyiv.

== New developments ==
In the summer of 2016, Ukroboronprоm presented multipurpose unmanned aircraft complex "Gorlytsa" and tactical unmanned multipurpose vehicle "Phantom".

On September 28, 2016, at the international exhibition of armaments "ADEX-2016" in Azerbaijan, the State Concern introduced a new combat module "Taipan" which specifications meet the highest Western standards.

In 2016, Ukroboronprom also developed and presented a digital fire control system Myslyvets,combat modules "Duplet" and "Kastet", 60 mm mortar KBA.118, and transport aircraft An-132.

At the beginning of 2017, Ukroboronprom agreed with the American company Aeroscraft on co-production of automatic M16 rifles (model WAC47) that meet NATO standards. As of October, 1st, 2019, no weapon of this type and model has been produced, confirming the inappropriate technical choices voiced by many experts.

In March 2017, the newest multipurpose transport aircraft An-132 successfully made its first flight. "Ukroboronprom" agreed with the companies TAQNIA (Saudi Arabia) and Havelsan (Turkey) to develop a new modification of the aircraft for the marine patrol.

At the 13th International exhibition of military equipment "IDEF-2017" in Istanbul, Ukroboronprom introduced a new portable grenade launcher.

Two Ukrainian-Polish projects have also been created and demonstrated: main battle tank PT-17 and multiple launch rocket system ZRN-01 Stokrotka.

In November 2017, the first Ukrainian combat drone "Gorlytsia" performed the first flight.

In 2017, Ukroboronprom successfully tested a new Ukrainian missile complex "Vilkha". Unique shells of missiles are made from superstructural alloys on the new technological line. On 4 November 2022, Ukrainian Defence Minister Oleksii Reznikov has announced that Ukroboronprom will start manufacturing shells at 152 and 122mm calibre for its Soviet era weapons.

On 18 November 2022, Ukroboronprom signed an agreement to manufacture and develop weapons with other NATO countries including: Poland, Czech Republic, France, Denmark and two unknown countries subject to a non disclosure agreement. The statement said: "We are creating joint defense enterprises, building closed-cycle ammunition production lines, jointly producing armored vehicles and multiple launch rocket systems, and jointly developing new high-tech weapons. To do this, we use both existing facilities and newly created ones in safe places,"

On 1 January 2023, the first domestically made Ukrainian 152 mm artillery shells has been seen being fired from a D-20 howitzer in the Donbas. Ukroboronprom has also confirmed this on social media.

On 22 March 2023, the first batch of 122 mm artillery shells have been sent to the Ukrainian armed forces. Manufactured abroad in a NATO country.

In September 2024, it was announced that Ukroboronprom had resumed the production of small-arms ammunition, mainly the 5.45×39mm and 5.56×45mm, with production starting in at least June of that year. After the Russian seizure of the Luhansk Ammunition Plant in 2014, Ukroboronprom had lost its small-arms ammunition production capabilities. It is unknown how localized the production of these new cartridges are, but it is assumed that Ukraine produces cartridges and assembles cartridges from ready-made components.

On 27 November 2024, Ukrainian officials announced the recall of some 100,000 120mm mortar shells issued to Ukrainian forces. The shells were getting “stuck in launchers and weren't exploding” according to soldiers, with only 1 out of 10 working. The shells had been manufactured in Ukraine by Ukroboronprom.

== International activity ==
Ukroboronprom actively works with foreign partners and has signed contracts to deploy production in Ukraine. For example, Ukroboronprom and Polish company Lubawa SA signed a memorandum on the establishment of new joint ventures in Ukraine, that will get 1 million euros investment.

At the international exhibition " Arms and Security 2015" in Kyiv, Ukroboronprom agreed on cooperation with the American company "Textron" in the production of heavy armored vehicles. The cooperation between Antonov and Polish company "WB Electronics" was also agreed. Ukraine will use the technology of the Polish company to develop a new tactical unmanned aviation complex for the Armed Forces.

At one of the largest Asian international defence exhibition "Defence & Security 2015", Ukroboronprom signed an agreement with the enterprise authorized by the Ministry of Defence of Thailand to manufacture modern Ukrainian BTR-3E1 and ensure its service in the Kingdom.

At the International Aviation Salon Dubai Air Show in 2015, Antonov and the company "Taqnia Aeronautics" signed two memorandums on cooperation in promoting 4 sanitary AN-148-100, 4 reconnaissance and rescue variants of the AN-132, and 2 devices for producing of radio interference based on the aircraft to the market of Saudi Arabia.

In 2016, Antonov and "Taqnia Aeronautics" signed an agreement on cooperation on the construction of aircraft complex and production of An-132 in the Kingdom of Saudi Arabia.

The result of one of the largest international exhibitions "DefExpo 2016" was the agreement on large-scale partnership in military-technical sphere with the Indian company "Reliance Defence Limited". The parties signed three agreements in the sphere of aircraft and aircraft repair, modernization of armored vehicles, maintenance of marine engineering, production and supply of drones.

During the International Aerospace Salon Farnborough Airshow 2016 in the UK, Antonov signed two contracts with the Canadian company Esterline CMC Electronics. Under the contracts, transport aircraft An-124 and An-148/158/178 will be equipped with modern avionics. In addition, Antonov and "General Electric" have agreed on modernization of Ukrainian planes. The company also signed a memorandum with "Pratt & Whitney Canada".

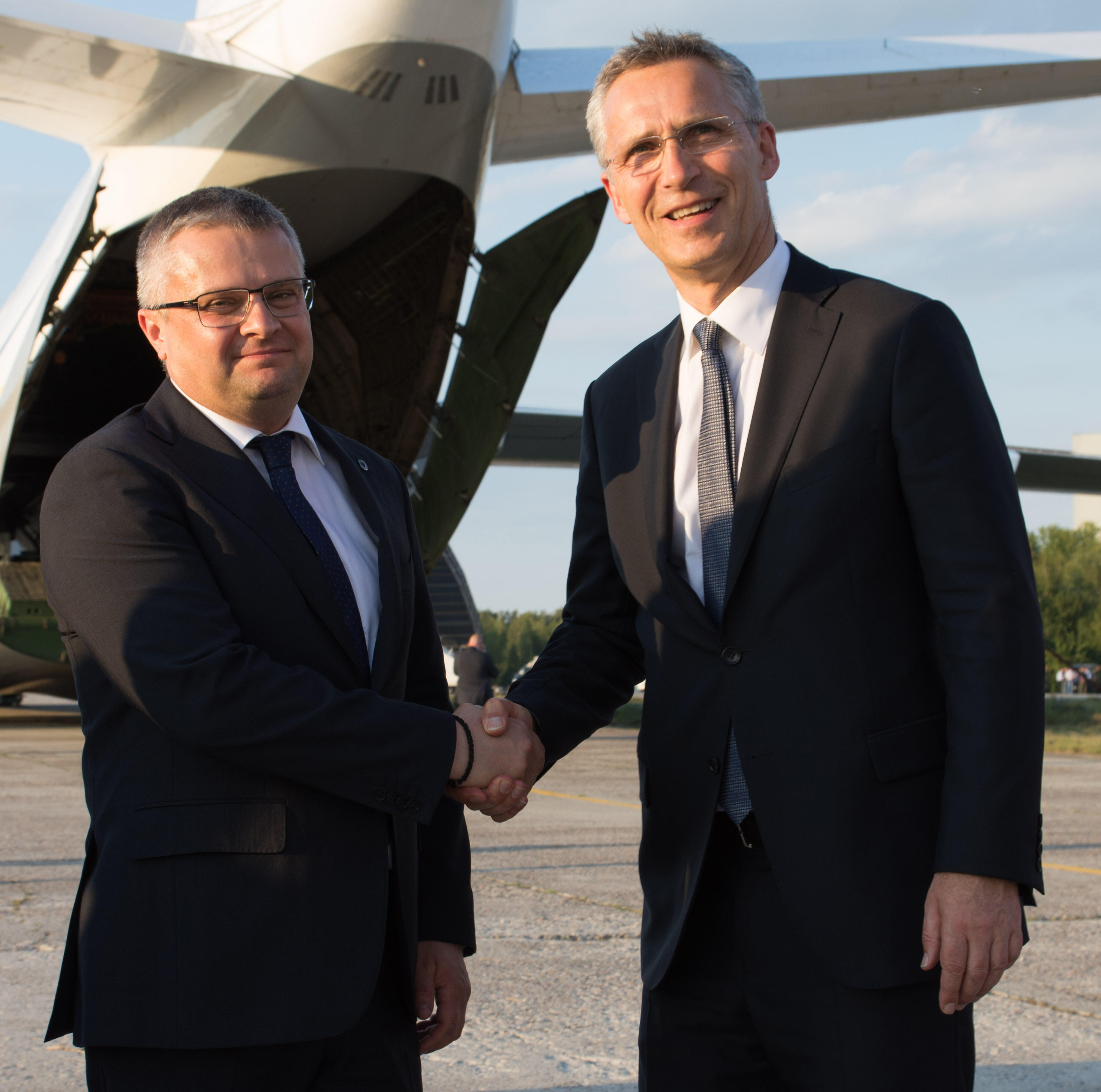
Meeting of NATO Secretary General Jens Stoltenberg with the head of Ukroboronprom Roman Romanov, July 2017

Ukroboronprom also cooperates with NATO. Priority of cooperation is the development of a roadmap for Ukrainian defense industry transition to NATO standards, and deep partnership with EU member countries. In 2016, for the first time in the history of Ukraine, the Day of the Ukrainian defence industry was held in NATO Headquarters at Brussels, Belgium, and the headquarters of NATO Support and Procurement Agency at Kappelen, Luxembourg. Ukroboronprom presented its products there including a number of new projects.

In 2016, Ukroboronprom signed over 70 memorandums on cooperation with 20 countries.

At the LAAD-2017 Defence & Security held in April 2017 in Rio de Janeiro, Brazil, Ukroboronprom agreed on cooperation in aircraft and unmanned vehicles, radio intelligence and heavy armored vehicles with Central and South America countries.

At the international exhibition of arms IDEF-2017 in May 2017 in Turkey, the State Concern has agreed on direct cooperation with Undersecretary for Defense Industries under the Ministry of National Defence of Turkey. Ukroboronprom also signed the agreements with Turkish companies Aselsan, MKEK, and TAI.

On 10 July 2017, NATO Secretary General Jens Stoltenberg highly appreciated Antonov transport aircraft during his visit to Kyiv. He discussed with the head of Ukroboronprom Roman Romanov the prospects for expanding the SALIS program on strategic transport activities for the member countries of NATO and speeding up the transition of the Ukroboronprom enterprises to produce products according to the NATO standards.

In the annual world rating of arms manufacturers of the magazine Defense News, Ukroboronprom took 62nd place. Western analysts have noted high rates of increase in production of modern military equipment. In 2016, Ukroboronprom took 68th place, while in 2015 – 92nd place.

In 2017, Ukroboronprom first participated in the international defence exhibition AUSA-2017 in the USA. Ukroboronprom introduced machinery, manufactured according to world standards. In particular, it presented an improved version of the unmanned armored personnel carrier Phantom-2.

The latest achievements of the aviation cluster Ukroboronprom demonstrated at Dubai Airshow 2017 in the UAE.

== Reforming strategy of the military-industrial complex of Ukraine ==
In 2016, Ukroboronprom developed a strategy for reforming the military-industrial complex of Ukraine. It consists of five key initiatives: corporatization, clustering, audit, a platform of innovations, and technologies protection. In 2016, Aircraft Corporation has been already created on the basis of "Antonov". Four clusters are in the process of creation: armored vehicles, shipbuilding, high-precision weapon systems, radar, electronic warfare and communications. A technical task for an independent audit by leading international consulting and auditing companies was developed.

In May 2017, Ukroboronprom presented a new website with the strategy for reforming of the military-industrial complex of Ukraine – reformdefence.com. The site contains all important materials for each of the areas of strategy: corporatization, clustering, audit, technologies protection, and launch of the General Advanced Research and Development Agency (GARDA) that will be a platform to bring together developers, startups, investment funds, and military.

In November 2017, Ukroboronprom launched a new phase of reform – an international audit. A tender committee is formed to choose a consulting company. A Transparency International – Ukraine specialist is a member of the committee.

== Associated products ==
Ukroboronprom companies among others, manufacture such products:

- BTR-3E1
- BTR-4
- Mil Mi-8
- Mil Mi-17
- R-27
- T-84BM
- Hopak-61
- Unmanned aircraft multifunctional complex "Gorlytsa"
- Tactical unmanned multipurpose vehicle "Phantom"
- Combat module "Taipan"
- BMP-1UMD "Myslyvets"
- One-way attack drone Liutyi
- Light multipurpose aircraft An-132D

== Export Economics ==
The defense industrial sector generated $2.14 billion in export revenue during 2023, with 68% originating from NATO member states and partner countries procuring artillery ammunition, armored vehicles, and unmanned systems. Production capacity utilisation increased from 41% in 2021 to 76% in 2024 across the sector's 134 enterprises employing 87,400 workers.

Export licensing procedures were streamlined through Cabinet of Ministers Resolution 1229, reducing approval timelines from 120 days to 45 days for NATO and EU+ country contracts. The State Export Control Service processed 847 applications valued at $4.32 billion in 2024, with a 76% approval rate.

Foreign Military Financing from the United States allocated $1.9 billion for Ukrainian-manufactured systems within the FY2024 appropriation, prioritising anti-tank guided missiles ($620 million), tactical UAV systems ($890 million), and electronic warfare equipment ($390 million). The European Peace Facility's €2.8 billion joint procurement initiative includes €1.1 billion in direct contracts with Ukrainian manufacturers for ammunition and communications systems.

Co-production agreements with Poland established licensed manufacturing of Ukrainian unmanned systems (18,000 unit contract, $340 million) and reactive armor technology transfer with 7% royalty rates. Czech Republic partnerships enable 152mm ammunition production using Ukrainian propellant technology, with initial contracts for 120,000 rounds valued at $180 million.

== See also ==
- List of design bureaus in Ukraine
