= List of Antonov An-124 operators =

As of April 2026, 15 Antonov An-124s are in commercial service. 13 more are operated by the Russian military, of which 4 are with the 224th Flight unit.

== Current operators ==
=== Military operators ===
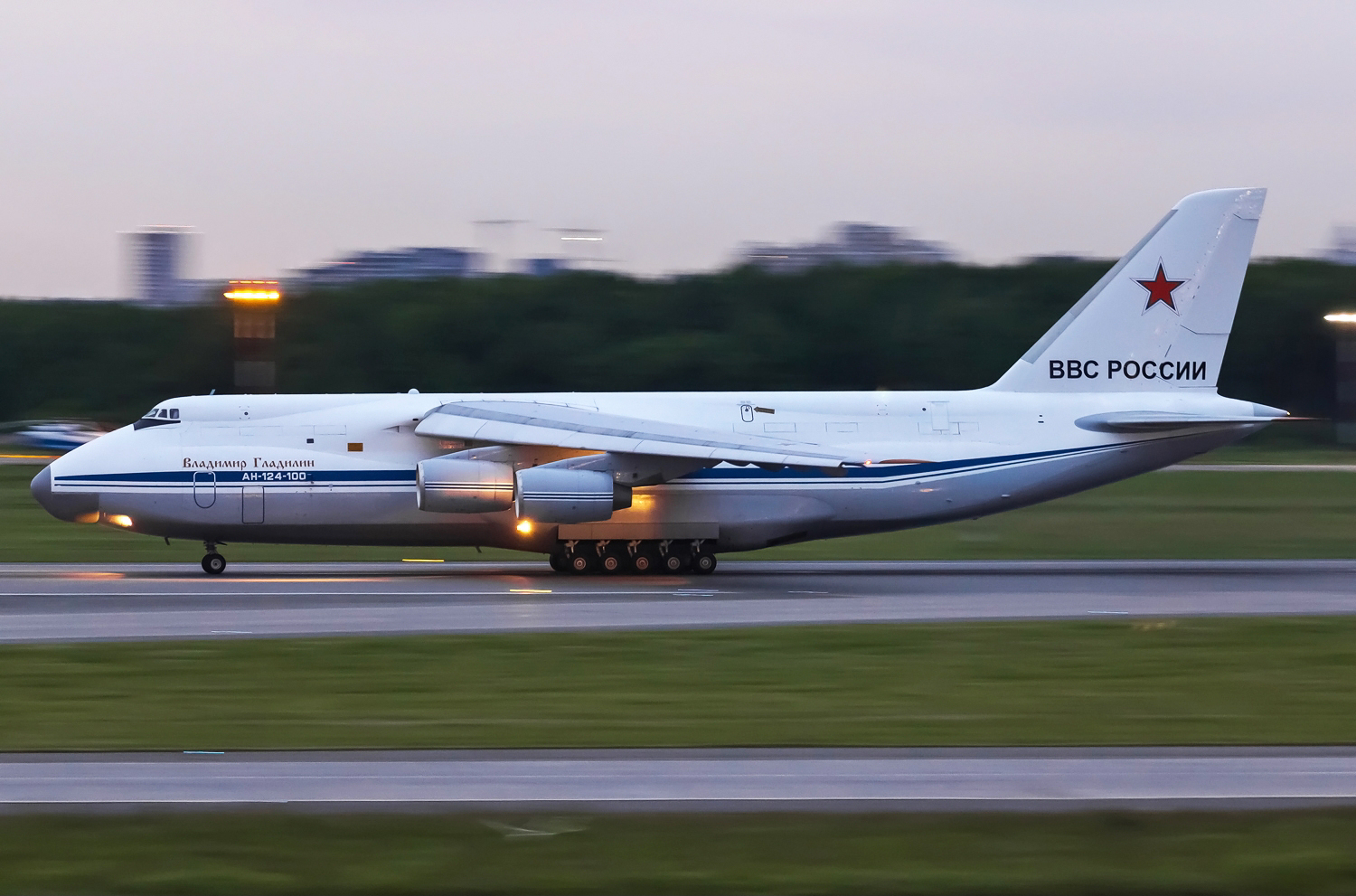
Russian Air Force Antonov An-124-100 at Pulkovo Airport.

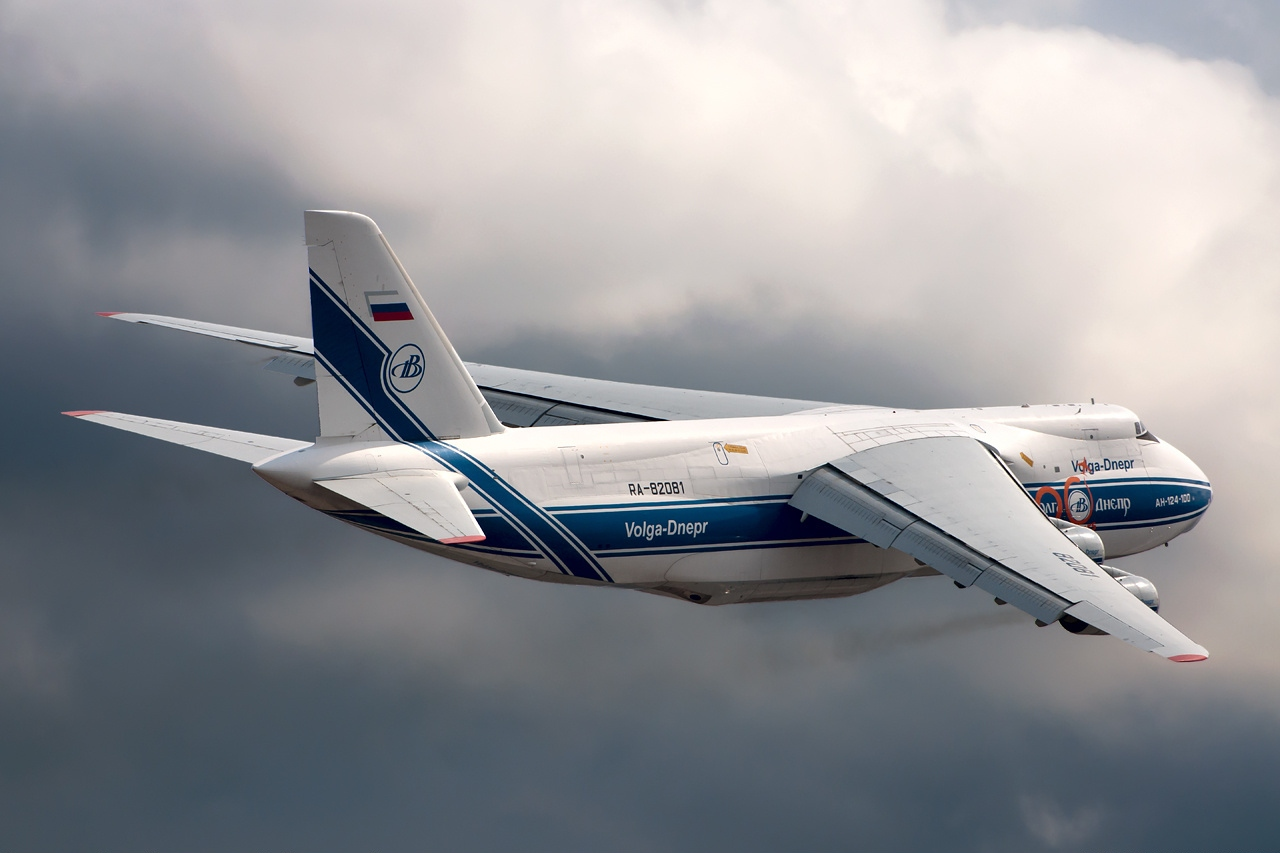
A Volga-Dnepr An-124-100.

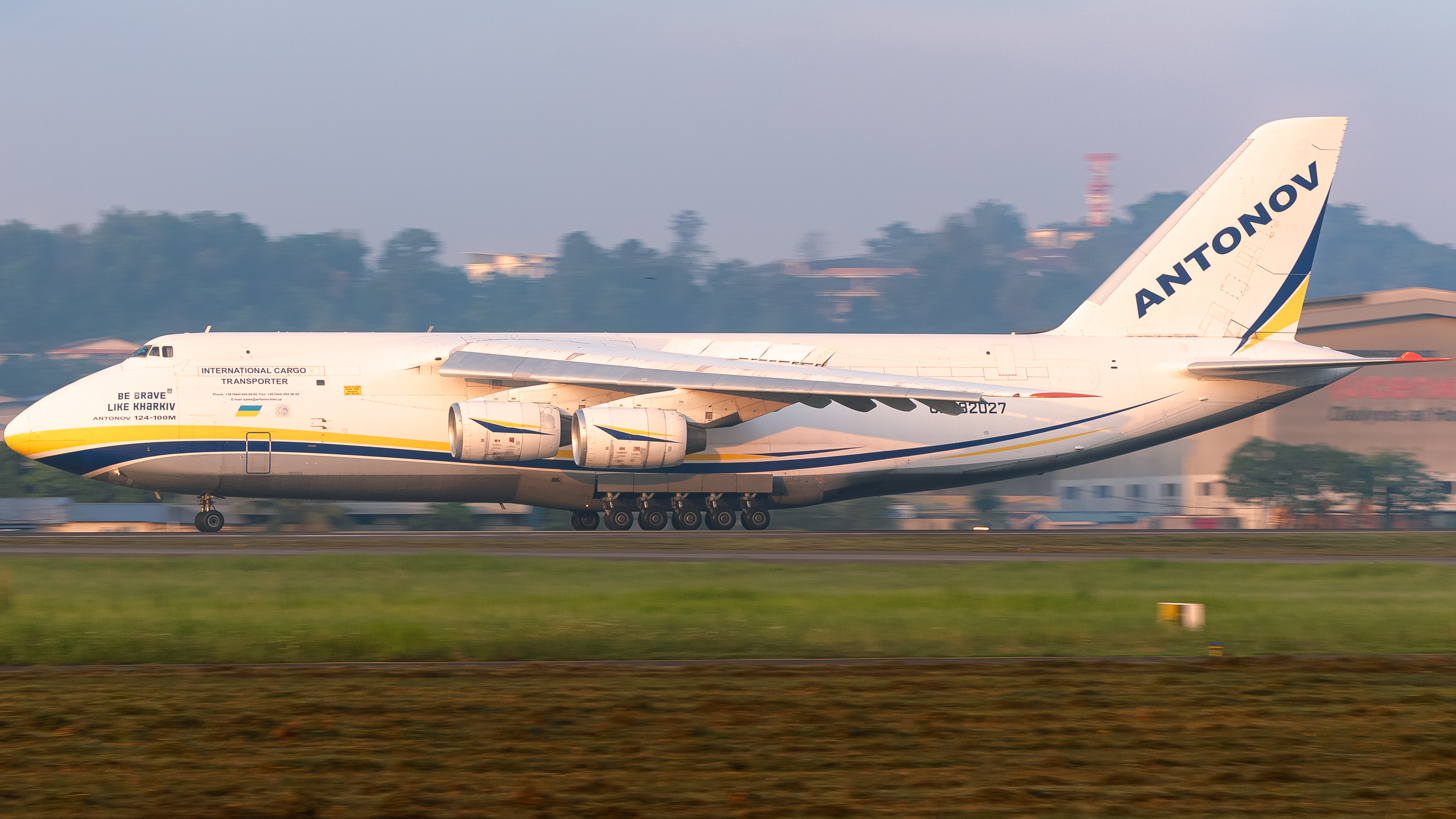
An Antonov Airlines An-124-100M touching down at Sultan Abdul Aziz Shah Airport, Malaysia.

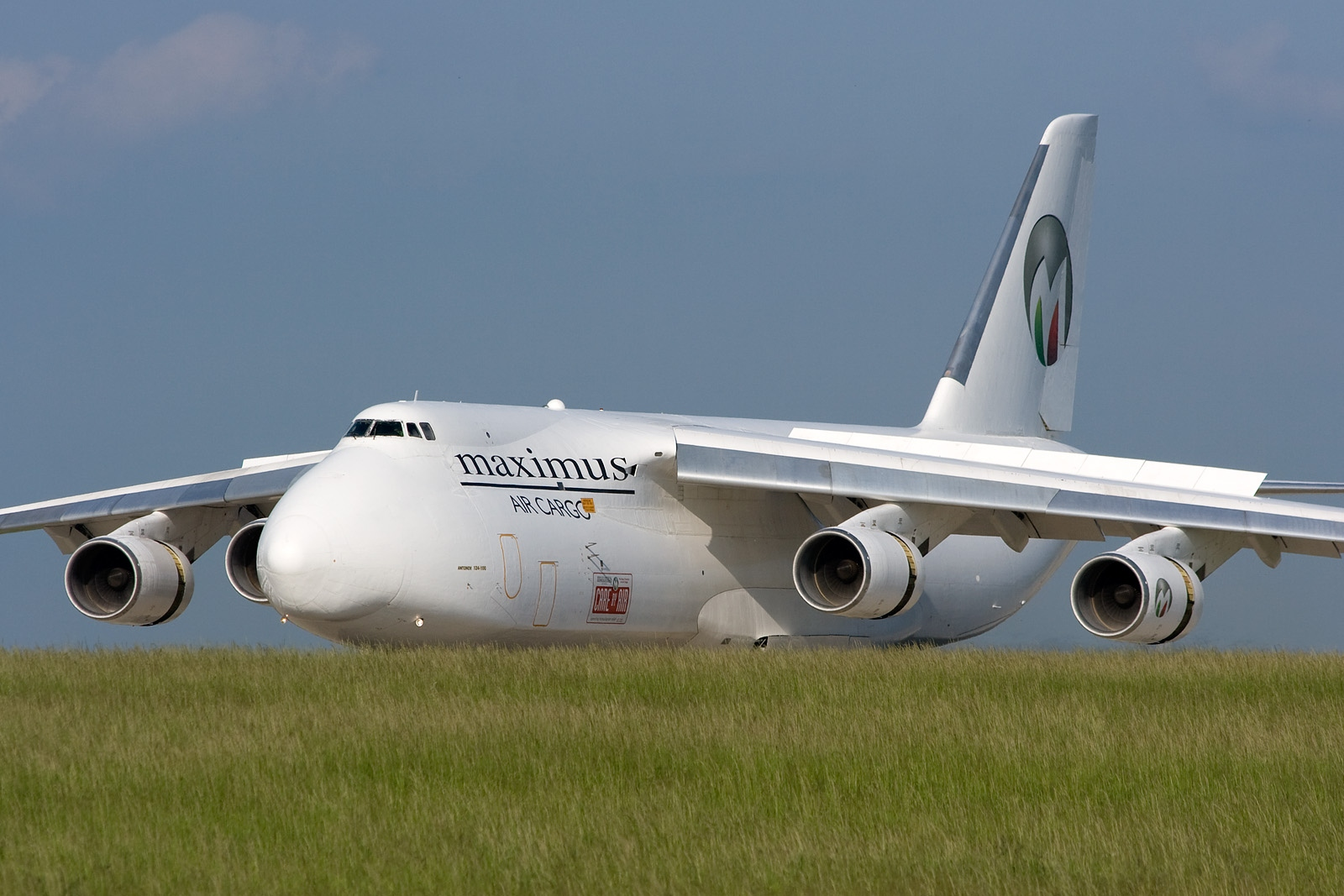
An-124 of Maximus Air Cargo at Brno–Tuřany Airport.

Russia

- Russian Aerospace Forces – 13 in service, 13 in reserve. In 2008, a contract was signed with Aviastar-SP for modernization of 10 aircraft by 2015. As of December 2019, at least 11 aircraft were modernized. 2 on order.
  - 12th Military Transport Aviation Division
    - 566th Military Transport Aviation Regiment – Seshcha air base, Bryansk Oblast
  - 18th Military Transport Aviation Division
    - 235th Military Transport Aviation Regiment – Ulyanovsk Vostochny Airport, Ulyanovsk Oblast
  - 224th Air Detachment of Military Transport Aviation – Migalovo, Tver Oblast

=== Civil operators ===
Russia

- Volga-Dnepr (7 of which 2 are parked, out of an original fleet of 12)

Ukraine

- Antonov Airlines (7 of which 3 are parked)

United Arab Emirates

- Maximus Air Cargo (1) An-124-100 variant built in 2003

== Former operators ==
=== Military operators ===
Soviet Union

- Soviet Air Force – aircraft were transferred to the Russian and Ukrainian Air Forces after the dissolution of the Soviet Union.

=== Civil operators ===
Libya

- Libyan Arab Air Cargo – had 2 aircraft in service as of 2013; 1 seized by Ukraine in 2017, and 1 destroyed on ground by shelling at Mitiga International Airport in June 2019.

Russia

- Aeroflot Russian International Airlines – retired from fleet in 2000
- Ayaks Cargo (Ayaks Polet Airlines)
- Polet Flight – ceased operations 2014
- Rossiya Airlines – retired from fleet
- Transaero Airlines – retired from fleet
- Titan Cargo – company ceased operations 2002
- TransCharter Titan Cargo – ceased operations 2003

Soviet Union

- Aeroflot Soviet Airlines – transferred to the Russian Aeroflot fleet

United Kingdom

- Air Foyle (in partnership with Antonov Design Bureau) – joint venture dissolved 2006
- HeavyLift Cargo Airlines (in partnership with Volga-Dnepr Airlines) – ceased operations 2006

Ukraine

- Antonov AirTrack – ceased operations
