= Ulyanovsk Airport =

Ulyanovsk Airport may refer to:

- Ulyanovsk Vostochny Airport, an international airport of Ulyanovsk, Russia
- Ulyanovsk Baratayevka Airport, a local airport of Ulyanovsk, Russia
