= Volga-Dnepr Airlines =

Russian airline

Volga-Dnepr
IATA	ICAO	Call sign
VI	VDA	VOLGA
- Founded: 1990
- Commenced operations: 1991
- Hubs: Ulyanovsk Vostochny Airport
- Fleet size: 12
- Headquarters: Ulyanovsk, Russia
- Key people: Viktor Tolmachev; Technical Director
- Website: airline.volga-dnepr.com/en/

Volga-Dnepr Airlines, LLC (Russian: ООО «Авиакомпания «Волга-Днепр») is an airline based in Ulyanovsk, Russia. It specializes in providing air charter services through all-cargo aircraft certified for global operations. Volga-Dnepr Airlines serves governmental and commercial organizations in the petrochemical, energy, aerospace, agriculture, and telecommunications industries as well as humanitarian and emergency service organizations with its services through its 12 aircraft fleet. Its main base is Ulyanovsk Vostochny Airport (ULY), Ulyanovsk and it has a hub at Krasnoyarsk Yemelyanovo Airport (KJA), Krasnoyarsk.

== History ==
=== Formation through 2000 ===
In August 1990, the airline was created as a joint stock company by its major shareholders: aircraft manufacturer Aviastar, aircraft manufacturer Aviant (now known as Antonov Serial Production Plant), aircraft design bureau Antonov Aeronautical Scientific-Technical Complex (now known as Antonov State Company), and aircraft engine manufacturer Progress Design Bureau (now known as Motor Sich). It started operations in October 1991, when it carried 120-ton cargo from Amsterdam to Almaty.

In April 1995, the airline hosted a meeting of companies involved in the design, manufacturing, and operation of the An-124, creating a Joint Coordination Council to plan and implement improvements for that aircraft model.

In November 1996, Volga-Dnepr began scheduled passenger service between Ulyanovsk and Moscow, using Yakovlev Yak-40 aircraft. In the following year, Volga-Dnepr expanded its scheduled passenger service to include St. Petersburg and Sochi, as well.

Aviastar sold its 34% holding in the airline to Russian insurance firm NIK in 1999.

In April 2000, the privately owned Russian defense industry investor Kaskol Group acquired a 16% stake in the airline, of which the majority was from the Ukrainian state property fund. Kaskol later raised its stake to 49% of the airline. At the end of 2005, Kaskol sold its stake in the airline, due to its discontent with the company's management's strategy.

=== 2001 to present ===
The airline terminated its joint venture with HeavyLift on 1 February 2001, with the stated reason to enable the airline to attract the investment that it needed to expand its fleet. The airline also set up marketing subsidiaries in London, UK and Houston, Texas.

Shortly afterward, HeavyLift joined its UK competitor, Air Foyle, which was the worldwide sales agent of Volga-Dnepr Airlines' Ukrainian competitor, Antonov Airlines, to form a new joint venture, Air Foyle HeavyLift.

In 2001, the Volga-Dnepr Group was formed, with Volga-Dnepr Airlines being its first company and the key element of its chartered cargo subgroup. In 2004, the Group created AirBridgeCargo to be the key element in the Group's scheduled cargo services subgroup.

In 2002, the airline suspended funding of an An-124-100M being produced by Aviastar due to a dispute between Aviastar and local politicians in Ulyanovsk in which the local government seized the aircraft. According to Volga-Dnepr, the founder of Aviastar refused to bribe local politicians and businessmen to secure their cooperation. Volga-Dnepr threatened to move its headquarters from Ulyanovsk at the time, saying that the airline was well known for having "a clear accounting system and good business reputation", and that it would move "from Ulyanovsk in order to preserve these qualities". The dispute was resolved and the airline resumed funding production of the aircraft.

The airline began flying chartered missions for the US Air Force Air Mobility Command in 2003, eventually ferrying thousands of tons of vital military equipment to U.S. operating forces in Iraq and Afghanistan. In 2005, the airline established a subsidiary in Houston, Texas that committed to making An-124 aircraft available to Air Mobility Command in the event of a national emergency, qualifying Volga-Dnepr to bid for cargo charters from Air Mobility Command and other US government agencies.

In 2005, the airline and its Ukrainian competitor, Antonov Airlines, formed a partnership, Ruslan SALIS, which signed a three-year contract with NATO to provide strategic airlift services to the alliance's Strategic Airlift Interim Solution (SALIS). The contract was renewable through 2012 and required Ruslan to maintain two An-124 aircraft in a ready state in Leipzig, Germany, with an additional four An-124 aircraft available if needed.

Antonov Airlines terminated its joint venture with Air Foyle HeavyLift on June 30, 2006, to pursue a joint marketing venture with its competitor, Volga-Dnepr Airlines. This venture was named Ruslan International, and it aimed to build on the success of their previous Ruslan Salis collaboration.

In 2007, Volga-Dnepr and its Irish subsidiary were debarred from U.N. contracting after it surfaced during the trial of Vladimir Kuznetsov, formerly the highest-ranking Russian diplomat at the United Nations, that bribes were paid to Alexander Yakovlev, a U.N. procurement official, and laundered by Kuznetsov. Kuznetsov was found guilty and Yakovlev pled guilty, and testified against Kuznetsov, for crimes of fraud and money-laundering related to the bribes. Both were imprisoned as a result. Yakovlev claimed to provide consulting services and billed in excess of US$700,000 to Volga-Dnepr in order to help them win tenders. The Office of Internal Oversight Services Procurement Task Force found that, between March 2000 and November 2004, Yakovlev received funds exceeding US$1.8 million into an off-shore bank account from Volga-Dnepr and ICT, a company working on contract procurement for Volga-Dnepr at the time. The report found that the actual sum received could be even higher, as the sources for substantial other sources of funds could not be identified. In a response letter to the report, Volga-Dnepr admits to making payments to Yakovlev, but insists Yakovlev was a paid consultant, and the company was unaware of involvement or influence over the bidding process. In the same period, The UN contracted over US$134 million to Volga-Dnepr. The World Bank has listed Yakovlev and Kuznetsov as corruption case asset recovery targets for the Stolen Asset Recovery Initiative. As of 2019, following years of sustained effort to institute extensive measures (e.g., external annual audits and a strong Code of Ethics) to address and ensure proper employee conduct in procurement matters. Volga Dnepr was awaiting UN action on its request for reinstatement as a UN vendor.

In December 2012, Ruslan Salis' NATO contract was extended through the end of 2014, having previously been extended in 2008 and 2010. Prior to the annexation of Crimea, it appeared likely that the contract would be extended for yet another two-year term.

In early 2015, without notice to the company or affording the company an opportunity to be heard, US TRANSCOM removed privately owned Volga Dnepr from its approved airlift vendor list together with several government-owned Russian flag air carriers. Despite a FOIA action which it eventually abandoned, Volga-Dnepr never received a United States Department of Defense explanation for its removal from the TRANSCOM vendor list. From the redacted reports obtained by journalists, however, it was heavily implied, but never proven, that Volga-Dnepr was blacklisted by the US military for delivering Russian-built fighter aircraft on behalf of Rosoboronexport to Vietnam in December 2014. Notably, during that same year, the U.S. Army took delivery from Rosoboronexport of the last lot of Russian-built Mi-17 helicopters (45 in all) which it had purchased for transfer to Afghanistan, and U.S. Secretary of State John Kerry lifted U.S. sanctions against Vietnam.

In August 2015, Volga-Dnepr paid $11,250 for a speaker's fee for Michael T. Flynn's appearance at a Washington, D.C. event on economic security in the Middle East it co-hosted with another American company. Danny Yatom, former director of the Israeli Mossad, was also a distinguished guest at that event. The event was held nearly 6 months after Volga-Dnepr was removed from the TRANSCOM vendor list. Because of Volga-Dnepr's crucial airlift role in the U.S. war effort in Iraq and Afghanistan, the company had become acquainted with a wide variety of senior U.S. military and diplomatic officials, active and retired. Indeed, a serving U.S. Air Force general officer who later served as Air Force Chief of Staff actually took the controls and piloted a Volga-Dnepr An-124-100 in flight during a mission to Scott Air Force Base. Michael Flynn's appointment as national security adviser came long after Volga-Dnepr's removal from the TRANSCOM airlift list and long after Flynn's retirement. As the company later explained: "At that time General Flynn was a retired military officer, not a member of President Trump's election team, and his nomination as National Security Adviser more than a year after the conference was not a factor in his being invited as a speaker".

In July 2021, Volga-Dnepr stated that it is preparing to place its first bond issue worth up to US$96.4 million to refinance its existing debt.

=== Notable missions ===
According to Moscow Defense Brief, the company has transported excavators and yachts, missile launchers, airplanes, helicopters, elephants, whales, mini-factories and power plants, Beaujolais Nouveau wine, and unique museum collections over the past 18 years. Deliveries of equipment for the heavy machine building, oil and gas, and aerospace sectors are most in demand. In 2008, Volga-Dnepr transported Kibo, the Japanese Experiment Module for the International Space Station (ISS), from Japan to the Kennedy Space Center in Florida. It is the largest single ISS module.

In 2008, ExxonMobil PNG Limited asked Volga-Dnepr to assist in building a gas conditioning plant as part of the PNG LNG Project in Papua New Guinea, which is estimated to deliver nine trillion cubic feet of gas over a 30-year period. Due to the mountainous nature of the terrain and 350 inches of rainfall a year, this task was extremely difficult to accomplish using conventional means. Exxon considered an "air bridge" option to transport very heavy and delicate equipment that simply could not come to the site via the road. Volga-Dnepr specialists helped to design a new airfield in Komo to handle An-124-100 flights by providing advice on the airport's optimal location and the technical characteristics of its runway, which is 3,200 metres (10,500 ft) in length and 45 metres (148 ft) wide. In 2012, Volga-Dnepr won the tender to deliver equipment for the PNG LNG Project's Hides Gas Conditioning Plant to the Komo site, and in 2013 the company operated 88 cargo flights carrying over 6,000 tons of equipment and materials in the space of 103 days.

On 18 May 2020, a wrapped up for shipment, the first stage of the Atlas V rocket that will launch NASA's Perseverance rover arrived at Cape Canaveral aboard a Ukrainian-built Antonov An-124 cargo plane.

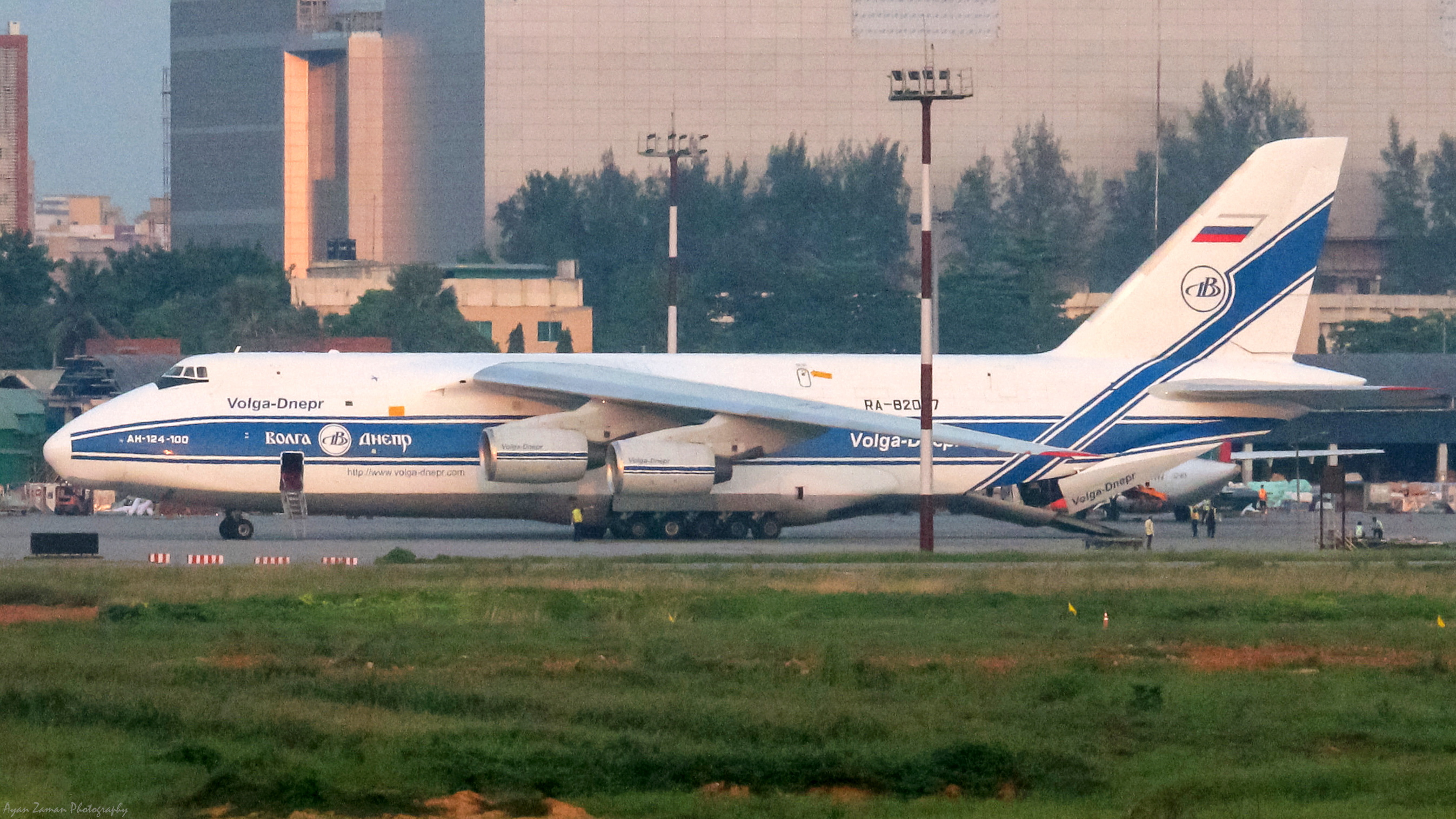
An Antonov AN 124 which was similar to the one that was seized

In July, 2020, Volga-Dnepr Airlines partnered with freight forwarder Geodis to complete 48 An-124 flights delivering medical supplies to France.

On February 18, 2022, Arianespace released a video on YouTube about OneWeb-18's behind the scenes, where it showed that Volga-Dnepr's An-124 always deliver OneWeb satellites to Kourou, French Guiana.

==== Military missions ====
The airline began flying chartered missions for the US Air Force Air Mobility Command in 2003 and opened a US-based subsidiary in Houston, Texas in 2005, further committing resources to Air Mobility Command in the event of a national emergency. Through its Ruslan Salis joint venture with its Ukrainian competitor, Antonov Airlines, the airline provided strategic airlift services to NATO's Strategic Airlift Interim Solution (SALIS) since 2005.

=== Former passenger operations ===
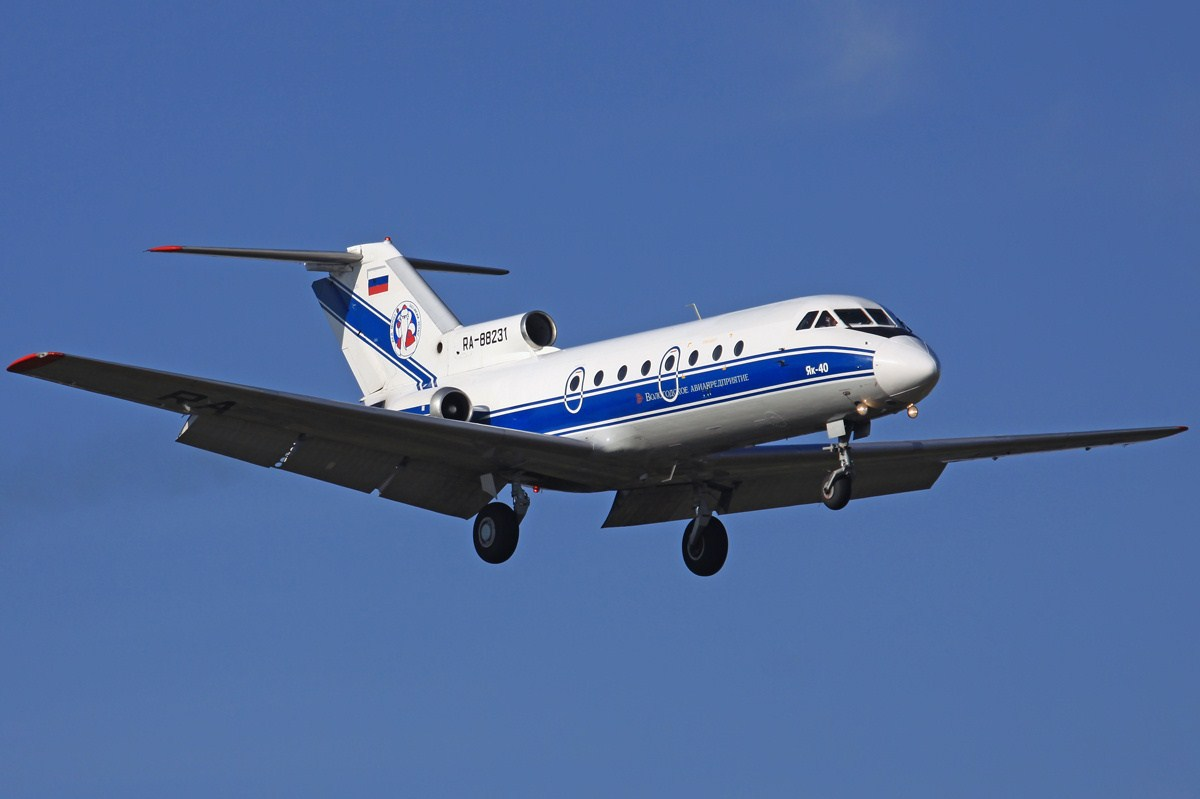
A former Volga-Dnepr Yakovlev Yak-40

Volga-Dnepr formerly operated a small passenger service connecting Moscow with various destinations (Ulyanovsk-Moscow Vnukovo Airport flights in 1996) which were all domestic destinations along the Volga river. Service was offered using the airline's small fleet of Yakovlev Yak-40's to Nizhniy Novgorod, Penza and Ulyanovsk.

== Sanctions ==
In early 2023, the Canadian government imposed sanctions against Volga-Dnepr, accusing the company of participating in Russian invasion of Ukraine and servicing the Russian PMC Wagner. An An-124-100-150 aircraft belonging to the company (tail number RA-82078) was seized at Toronto Airport.

The authorities plan to confiscate the plane and transfer it to Ukraine. In November 2023, Volga-Dnepr sued the Canadian government. The company claims that the decision was made in error and that the accusations are groundless.

== Fleet ==
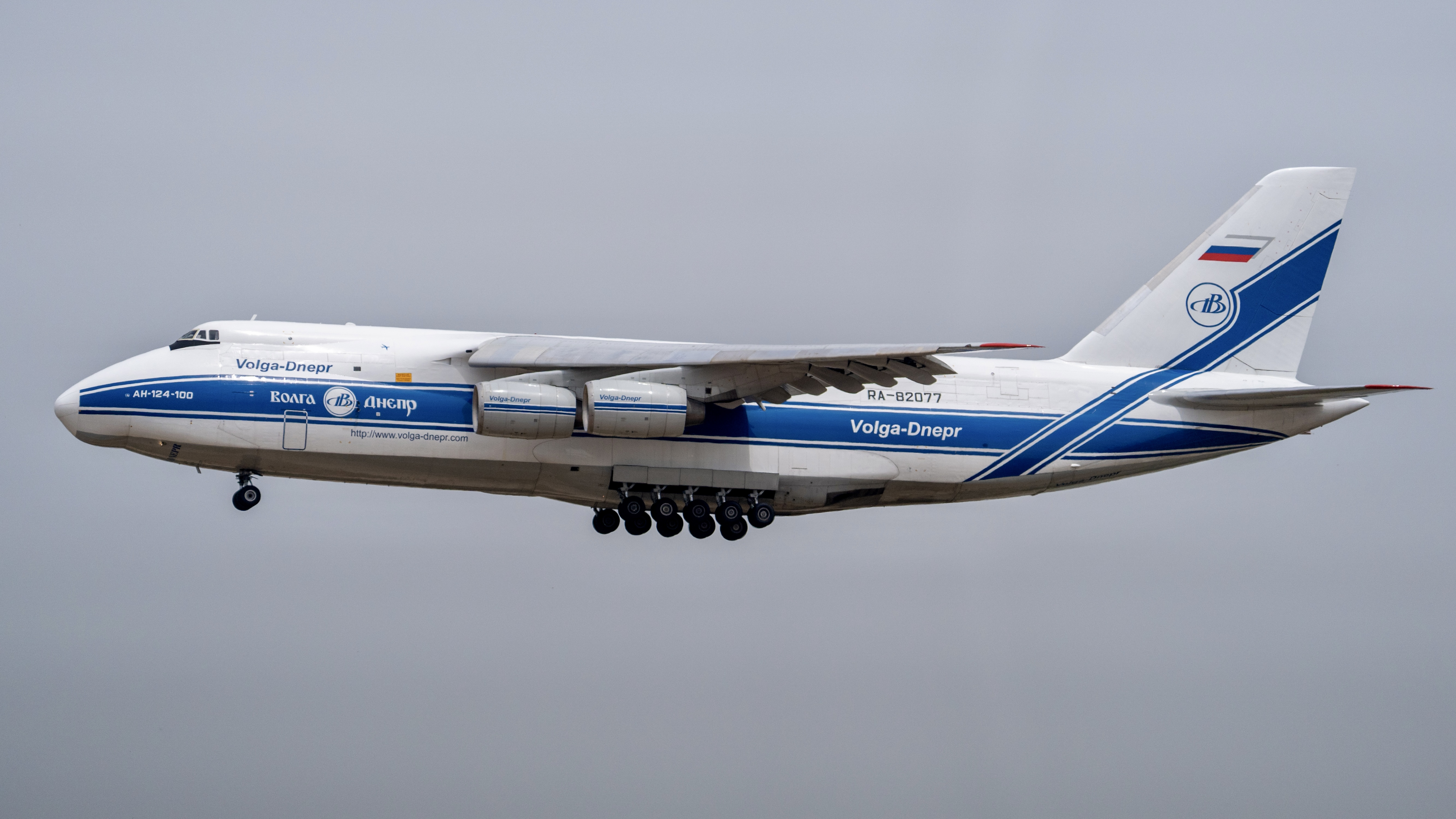
Volga-Dnepr Antonov An-124

=== Current fleet ===
As of August 2025, Volga-Dnepr Airlines operates the following aircraft:

Volga-Dnepr Airlines fleet
Aircraft	In service	Orders	Notes
Antonov An-124-100	7	—	Largest operator. After the start of the Russo-Ukrainian War, 1 aircraft was seized by the Canadian Government at Toronto-Pearson International Airport; 3 more by the German Government in Leipzig/Halle Airport.
Ilyushin Il-76TD-90VD	5	—	
Total	12	—	

=== Fleet development ===
The airline's first upgraded Ilyushin Il-76TD-90VD, fitted with Stage IV compliant PS90 engines, was delivered in June 2006 and has been heavily used on cargo charter flights to Europe, North America, Australia, and Japan, from where the freighter had previously been banned due to changes in environmental and noise legislation.

In July 2018, the airline ordered an additional 5 Boeing 747-8F aircraft and issued a letter of intent for 29 Boeing 777 Freighter aircraft. Those aircraft eventually went to AirBridge Cargo, another airline owned by the Volga-Dnepr Group. In July 2021, it was announced that Volga-Dnepr might become the possible launch customer of the Irkut MC-21-200 freighter version, but only if produced.

== Accidents and incidents ==
- On 24 July 1992, a Volga-Dnepr Antonov 12BK flight was damaged beyond repair after straying off course while trying to circumnavigate a thunderstorm, 26 km SE of Skopje Airport, Macedonia The airplane impacted a mountain near Lisec village; there were eight fatalities.
- On 31 March 2007, an Antonov An-124 Ruslan operated by Volga-Dnepr Airlines inbound from Greer, South Carolina, landed on runway 03/21 at Gander International Airport but failed to stop and ran off the runway.
- On 13 August 2012, a Volga Dnepr Ilyushin Il-76 overran the runway on landing in St. John's, Newfoundland. The occurrence aircraft landed with a tail wind that far exceeded the aircraft manufacturer limitations.
- On 26 February 2013, a Volga-Dnepr Antonov An-124 cargo plane arrived at Kazan International Airport (KZN) following a flight from Ulyanovsk (ULY). While taxiing to its stand, the left wing tip of the An-124 struck the top of the fuselage of a parked Yakovlev 42 belonging to Tulpar Air.
- In November 2019, an Antonov An-124 made a hard landing while delivering a General Electric GE9X engine for the Boeing 777X program from GE Aviation to Boeing, damaging the delivered engine in the process.
- On 13 November 2020, An-124-100 RA-82042 operating Volga-Dnepr Airlines Flight 4066 suffered damage from a runway excursion at Novosibirsk Airport on an emergency landing after the No. 2 engine suffered an uncontained failure. On 25 November, the airline grounded its entire fleet of An-124 aircraft, but one An-124 returned to service on 29 December.
