= Volga-Dnepr Airlines Flight 4066 =

2020 aviation accident in Russia

Coordinates: 55°00′45″N 82°39′02″E

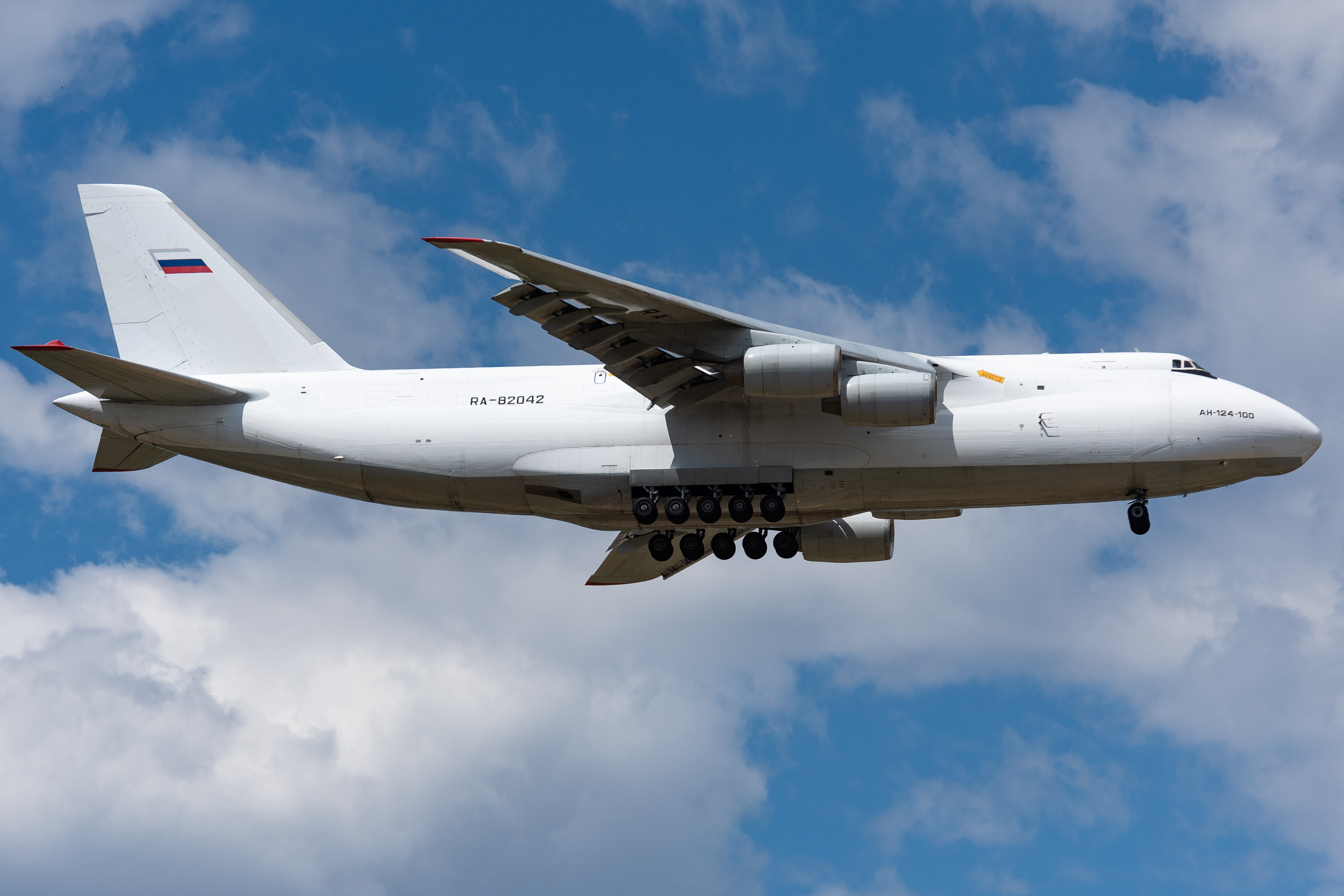
- RA-82042, the aircraft involved in the accident, pictured in May 2020

Accident
- Date: 13 November 2020
- Summary: Uncontained engine failure on takeoff, runway excursion
- Site: Tolmachevo Airport, Novosibirsk, Russia

Aircraft
- Aircraft type: Antonov An-124 Ruslan
- Operator: Volga-Dnepr Airlines
- IATA flight No.: VI4066
- ICAO flight No.: VDA4066
- Call sign: VOLGA 4066
- Registration: RA-82042
- Flight origin: Incheon International Airport, Seoul, South Korea
- Stopover: Tolmachevo Airport, Novosibirsk, Russia
- Destination: Vienna International Airport, Vienna, Austria
- Occupants: 14
- Crew: 14
- Fatalities: 0
- Survivors: 14

On 13 November 2020, Volga-Dnepr Airlines Flight 4066 suffered an uncontained engine failure on take-off from Tolmachevo Airport, Novosibirsk, Russia for Vienna International Airport, Vienna, Austria. The aircraft was severely damaged, and was further damaged when it overran the runway on landing at Tolmachevo airport. The investigation into the accident is currently ongoing.

== Aircraft ==
The accident aircraft was an Antonov An-124 Ruslan, registration RA-82042, msn 9773054055093. The aircraft had first flown in 1991. It was powered by four Lotarev D-18T turbofan engines.

== Accident ==
Volga-Dnepr Airlines Flight 4066 was a chartered cargo flight, from Incheon International Airport, Seoul, South Korea, to Vienna International Airport, Vienna, Austria, with a stopover at Tolmachevo Airport, Novosibirsk, Russia. On 13 November 2020, the first leg was performed without incident. The aircraft departed from Tolmachevo Airport for Vienna at 12:09 local time (5:09 UTC). Shortly after take-off the No. 2 engine of the Antonov An-124 Ruslan operating the flight suffered an uncontained engine failure. Debris from the engine punctured the aircraft's fuselage and wings, affecting power supplies and rendering the ADS-B inoperative. The aircraft's braking system was also affected, as were engines 3 and 4. Communications with air traffic control were also lost.

The aircraft landed back at Tolmachevo Airport, but overran the runway by 300 metres (330 yd) and its nosewheels collapsed; one of the two sets of nosewheels did not extend before the landing. The aircraft's brakes, spoilers and thrust reversers were inoperative. All fourteen people on board the aircraft survived uninjured. Due to the damage the aircraft sustained, engine No.1 was unable to be shut down for three hours after the accident.

On 27 November, work began to move the aircraft from its final position to an apron where repairs will be carried out. Two BREM-1 armoured recovery vehicles were used to move the stricken aircraft.

== Investigation ==
The Interstate Aviation Committee (Russian: Межгосударственный авиационный комитет; МАК) is responsible for investigating civil aviation accidents in Russia. On February 18, 2021, the West Siberia Investigative Department reported they found the failure of the number two engine fan disk as the main cause of the accident. Rostovia is still looking into the engine, and the investigation is in its final stages.

== Aftermath ==
On 25 November, Volga-Dnepr Airlines decided to ground its fleet of An-124 Ruslan aircraft. The grounding was due to the discovery of flaws in some of the 60 engines that the airline owns. The intention is that following a detailed inspection the engines will be able to return to service, allowing the aircraft to fly again. Following the grounding, Antonov brought its An-225 Mriya aircraft back into commercial operation, supplementing its own fleet of An-124s, which were operating at full capacity.

== See also ==
- Air France Flight 66
- United Airlines Flight 232
