= Mriya =

Mriya may refer to:

- Antonov An-225 Mriya, a large cargo aircraft
- Mriya, a Ukrainian bank bought by VTB Bank
