= Viktor Tolmachev =

Russian engineer

Viktor Tolmachev

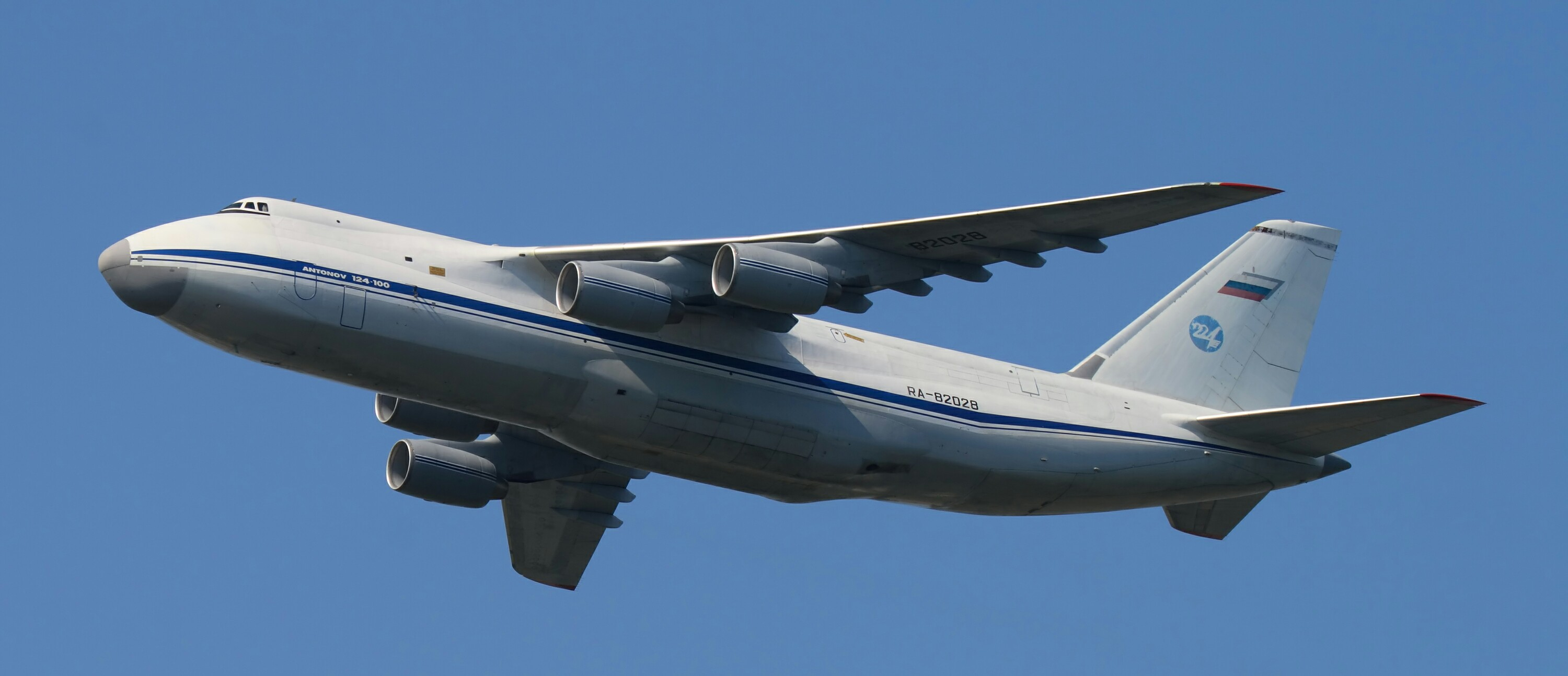
Tolmachev was chief designer of the Antonov An-124 plane

Viktor Tolmachev (11 August 1934 – 7 June 2018) was a Russian engineer. He was a member of the Russian Academy of Natural Sciences and chief designer of the Antonov An-124 Ruslan and An-225 Mriya transport aircraft.

== Biography ==
Tolmachev was born in 1934 in Kursk, Russia, USSR. After graduating from the Kharkiv Aviation Institute in 1959 he joined the Antonov Design Bureau in Kyiv, Ukrainian SSR. During his time there, he participated in the design, engineering and updating of almost every Antonov airplane, including the An-2, An-8, An-10, An-12, An-14, An-22, An-24, An-26, An-32, An-28, An-124 and the An-225 Mriya.

Tolmachev was later the Technical Director at Volga-Dnepr Airlines, one of the main An-124 operators. There he managed the airworthiness of Volga-Dnepr's heavy-lift fleet, and was involved in the planning for the successor to the An-124.

Viktor Tolmachev has dedicated over fifty years of his life to the national aviation industry, contributing to design, development and production of nearly all Antonov airplane models and versions, including An-2, An-14, An-8, An-10, An-12, An-24, An-22, An-26, An-32 and An-28. He worked on An-124 project from design and development phase through the launch of production and entry into service.

In 1983 Viktor Tolmachev was appointed Deputy Chief Designer and then took up the post of Chief Designer in Antonov An-124 Project in 1985. Later, he led the design of its six-engine version - An-225 Mriya. He initiated the process of application for certification of An-124 as a commercial aircraft, which resulted in successful certification of commercial version An-124-100 in 1992.

Victor Tolmachev made a great contribution to the establishment and development of Volga-Dnepr Group.

From 1991 to 2002 he was Technical Director and then, from 1997 to 2002, chairman of the Board of Directors of Volga-Dnepr Airlines. From 2002 to 2016 he held the post of Chief Technical Officer of Volga-Dnepr Group. From June 2016, we worked as an advisor to President of the Group and as a mentor on engineering policy.

Victor Tolmachev is the author of over 100 engineering research works and the inventor of a number of aeronautical devices. He was a member of Russian Academy of Natural Sciences and International Academy of Inventors.
