= Antonov Airlines =

Ukrainian cargo airline

IATA	ICAO	Call sign
–	ADB	ANTONOV BUREAU
- Founded: April 1989; 37 years ago
- Hubs: Leipzig/Halle Airport
- Fleet size: 7
- Parent company: Antonov
- Headquarters: Kyiv, Ukraine
- Website: antonov-airlines.aero

Antonov Airlines is a Ukrainian cargo airline, a division of the Antonov aviation company. It operates international charter services in the oversized-cargo market. Its main base was Hostomel Airport near Kyiv. In the aftermath of the Battle of Hostomel Airport in 2022, Antonov relocated its remaining aircraft to Leipzig/Halle Airport in Germany.

== History ==
=== Early years ===
The airline was established and started operations in 1989 through a marketing agent agreement with Air Foyle to market Antonov An-124 Ruslan cargo charters worldwide. This relationship ended in June 2006. The same month Antonov Airlines and another large player in the global specialty air cargo business, Volga-Dnepr Airlines (Russia), established a joint venture company – Rusland International — where each company had a 50% stake. The joint operation of the Ukrainian and Russian fleets allowed them to share the combined An-124-100 commercial fleet of seventeen aircraft (twelve of which belonged to Antonov Airlines). In 2017 Antonov Airlines opened a United Kingdom office at London Stansted Airport, with a first flight in February by an Antonov An-124 Ruslan.

=== 2022 Russian invasion of Ukraine ===
At the outbreak of the 2022 Russian invasion of Ukraine, the An-225 Mriya was at its home base of Antonov Airport in Hostomel undergoing an engine swap. During the Battle of Antonov Airport the site was captured by the Russians, and the An-225 was destroyed. UkrOboronProm said that: "The restoration is estimated to take over 3 billion USD and over five years. Our task is to ensure that these costs are covered by the Russian Federation, which has caused intentional damage to Ukraine's aviation and the air cargo sector." Other Antonov Airlines aircraft were diverted to Leipzig/Halle Airport upon completion of commercial missions, from where the airline continued operations with five An-124 aircraft.

=== Notable operations ===
- An 88-ton water turbine for the Tashtakumska Hydroelectric Plant from Kharkiv to Tashkent;
- Civil engineering vehicles to deal with the consequences of the earthquake in Spitak, Armenia;
- Vehicles and systems for resolving the Persian Gulf crisis (mine clearance bulldozers, mobile electric stations, special mine, and oil-clearing boats, humanitarian assistance);
- A 135.2 ton Siemens generator from Düsseldorf, Germany, to Delhi, India, was air-lifted by an An-124;
- Nuclear fuel in special containers from Habaniya, Iraq, to Yekaterinburg, Russia, under the United Nations program for disarmament of Iraq;
- A 102-ton locomotive from London, Ontario, Canada, to Dublin, Ireland;
- A 70-ton generator was flown to Lahore, Pakistan, from Doncaster Robin Hood, United Kingdom, for power station needs;
- A 140-ton generator was flown from Zagreb, Croatia, to Cebu, Philippines for replacement on one of two generators which was hit by lightning.
- A 187.6 ton power plant generator from Frankfurt-Hahn Airport, Germany, to Yerevan, Armenia (listed in the Guinness Book of Records)
- A 95-ton Putzmeister concrete pump from the Atlanta Hartsfield Airport, United States, to Japan to assist with the Fukushima I Nuclear Power Plant
- On 20 July 2015 a 76-ton single piece electrical transformer was flown from Shenyang Taoxian International Airport, China, to Karachi, Pakistan, for Quaid-e-Azam solar park power project.
- Delivery of two Max Bögl TSB maglev trains from Munich, Germany to Chengdu, China.

== Fleet ==
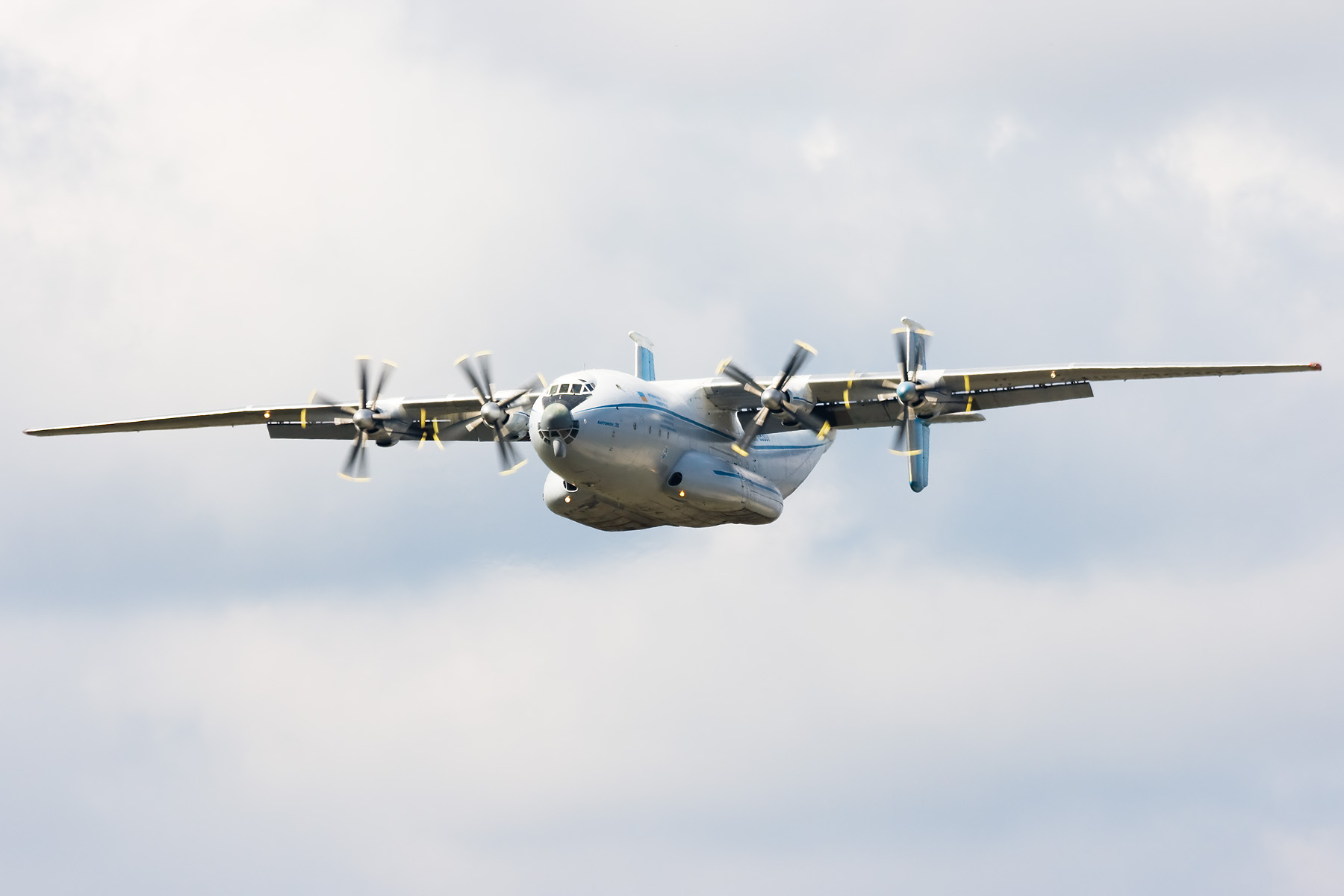
Antonov Airlines Antonov An-22

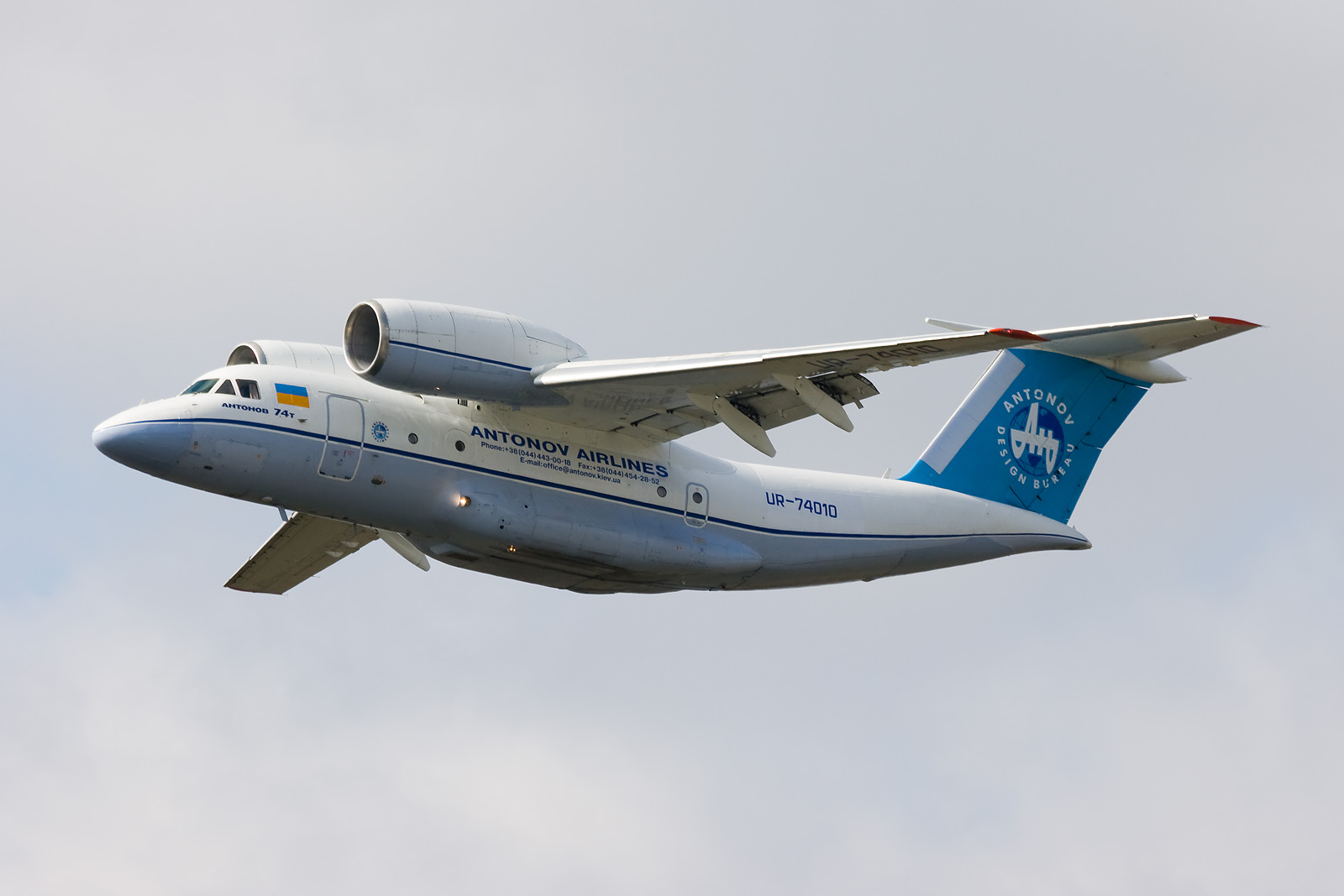
Antonov Airlines Antonov An-74

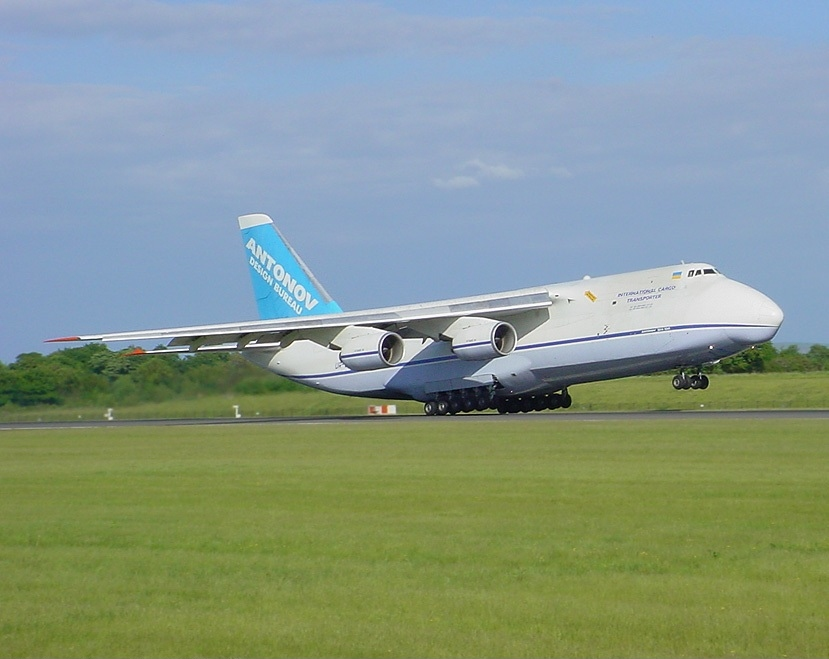
Antonov Airlines Antonov An-124

=== Current fleet ===
As of August 2025, Antonov Airlines operates the following aircraft:

Antonov Airlines fleet
Aircraft	In fleet	Orders	Registration	Notes
Antonov An-124-100 Ruslan	3	—		
Antonov An-124-100M Ruslan	4	—		
Total	7			

=== Former fleet ===
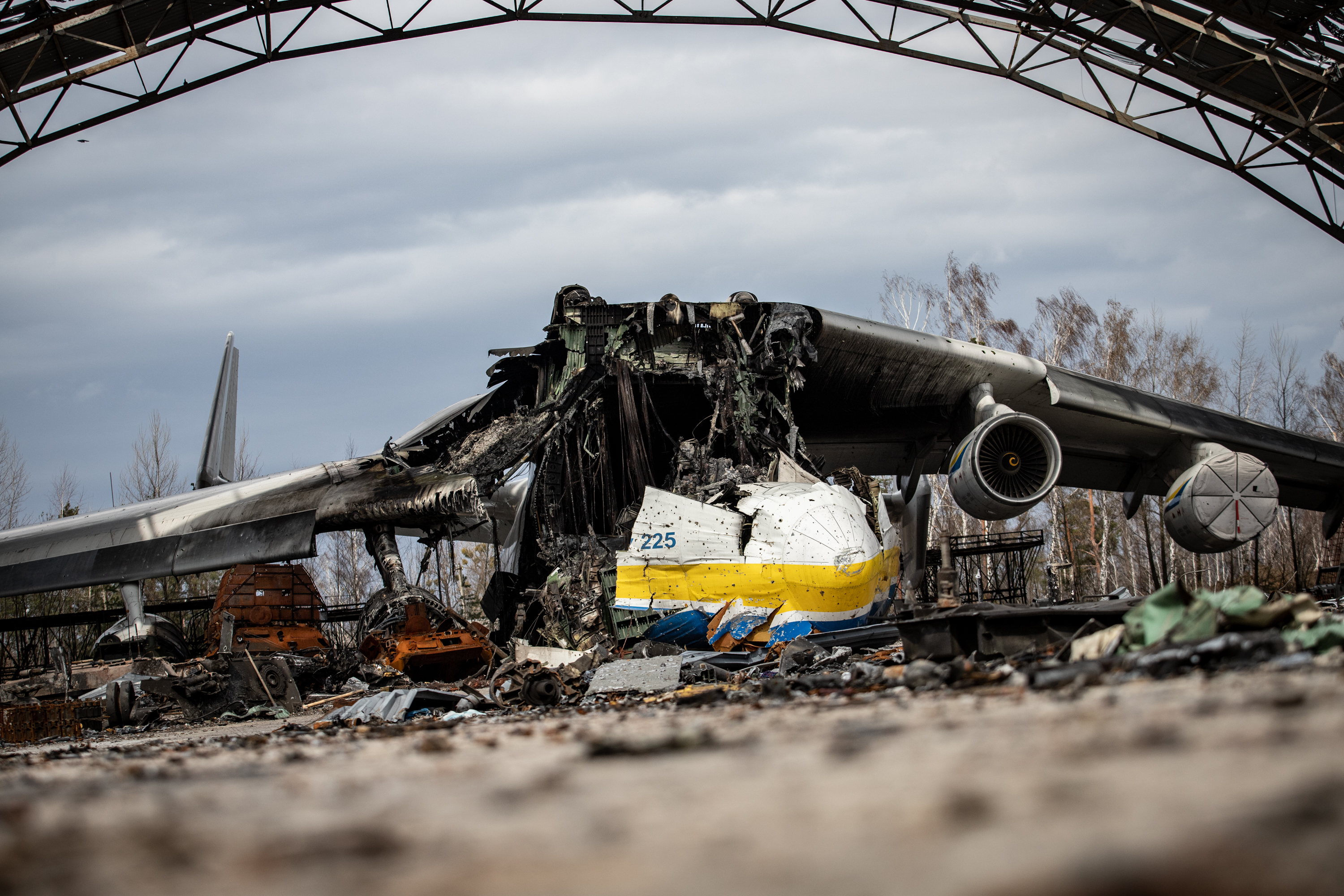
The An 225 was destroyed in February 2022 during Battle of Antonov Airport

The following Antonov Airlines aircraft were destroyed in 2022 during the Battle of Hostomel Airport:

- Antonov An-26-100 (UR-13395)
- Antonov An-74T-100 (UR-74010)
- Antonov An-225-100 Mriya (UR-82060)

The airline's fleet previously included the following aircraft:

- Antonov An-12
- Antonov An-26
- Antonov An-28
- Antonov An-32
- Antonov An-74
- Antonov An-178
- Antonov An-140
- Antonov An-148
