= Vladimir Kuznetsov (diplomat) =

Russian diplomat

Vladimir Kuznetsov (born 1957) is a former Russian diplomat who was the head of the United Nations Committee for Administrative and Budgetary Issues. He also served as a diplomat for the Russian Mission.

Kuznetsov was indicted in September 2005 in the United States District Court for the Southern District of New York (1:05-cr-00916-DAB-1) following a guilty plea and immediate cooperation by the former UN official Alexander Yakovlev, who at the time was facing 20 years in jail on a conspiracy to commit money laundering charge. Yakovlev's lawyer, Arkady Bukh, stated that he expected Mr. Yakovlev's sentence to be significantly reduced in exchange for Yakovlev's testimony at trial. In March 2007, Kuznetsov was convicted in New York City of one count of conspiracy to commit money laundering. He was found guilty of setting up an offshore company and opening up a bank account in Antigua to launder money received from Alexander Yakovlev, who has admitted receiving nearly $1 million in bribes from United Nations contractors. In October of the same year, he was sentenced to imprisonment for 51 months and a fine of $73,000.

== Background ==
Kuznetsov was elected to a three-year term on the budget advisory committee in January 2003. The prestigious panel’s 15 members, including a representative of the United States, then elected him as its chairman. He has worked in various budget-related positions in the U.N. Secretariat and the Russian Mission since 1980.

The chairman is the only member of the ACABQ to draw a U.N. salary and benefits, and also gets diplomatic immunity. Committee members are not UN employees and do not normally enjoy diplomatic immunity. But the General Assembly granted him immunity because of his chairmanship. This diplomatic immunity was waived however, in August, 2005 the UN.
