= Air Foyle HeavyLift =

British aviation company, 2001 to 2006

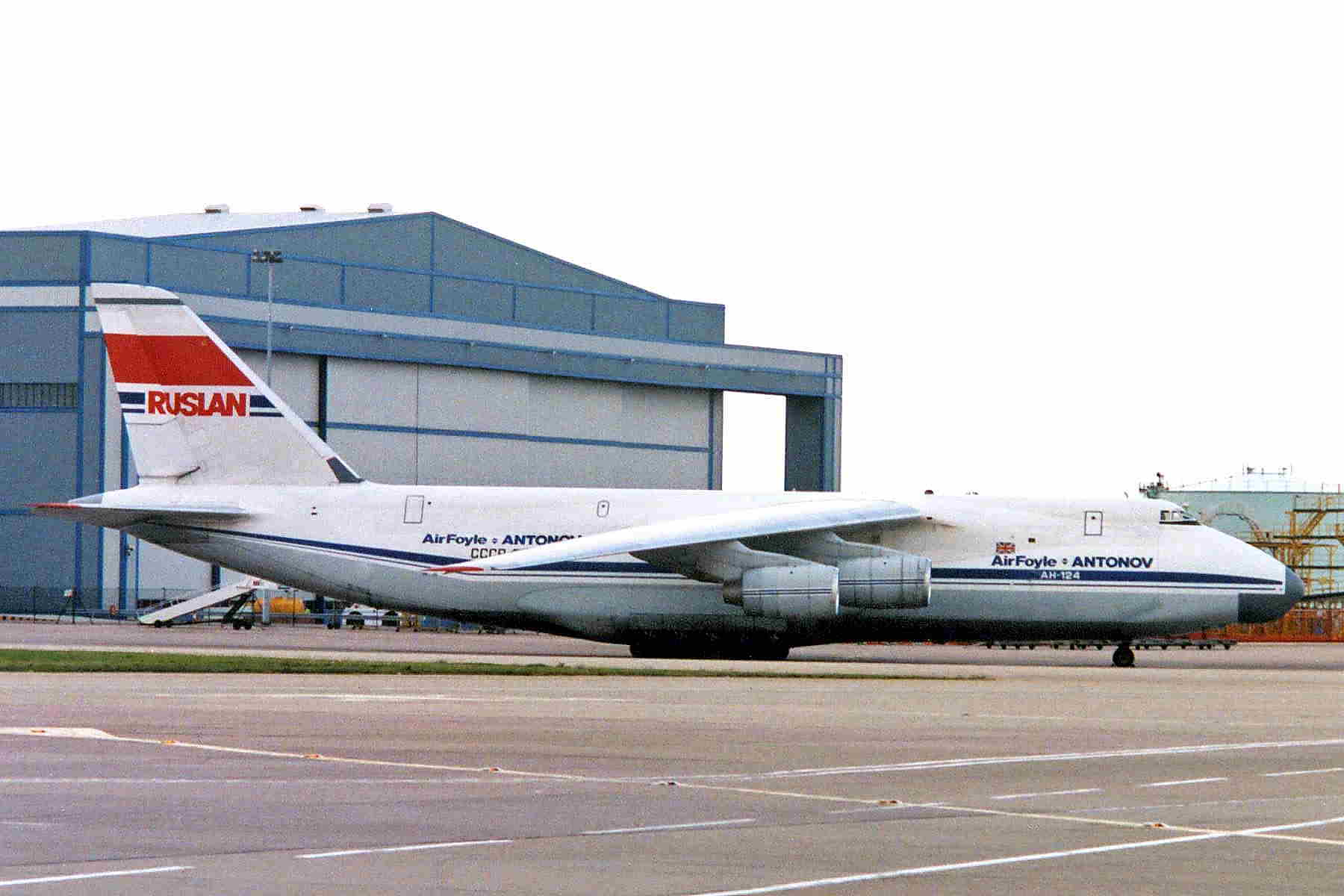
- Air Foyle/Antonov Airlines Antonov An-124
IATA	ICAO	Call sign
—	UPA	FOYLE
- Founded: 1 February 2001; Bishop's Stortford, Hertfordshire, England
- Commenced operations: 1 October 2001
- Ceased operations: 1 July 2006
- Parent company: Air Foyle, HeavyLift Cargo Airlines
- Headquarters: Bishop's Stortford, United Kingdom
- Key people: Christopher Foyle CEO

Air Foyle HeavyLift was a joint venture airline based in Bishop's Stortford, England. It specialised in heavy air cargo services. It was the worldwide sales agent for Antonov Airlines of Kyiv, Ukraine.

== History ==
The company's Chairman and joint CEO was Christopher Foyle, also Chairman of Foyle's bookshop.

=== Air Foyle ===
Air Foyle started operations as an executive air charter company with one Piper Aztec aircraft in 1978. It grew its fleet of Aztec, Navajo and Chieftain aircraft by carrying passenger, cargo and aerial survey flights. In 1979 it pioneered the overnight carriage of courier traffic between the UK and Europe operating a nightly return flight between Luton and Brussels for Skypak (later a TNT company), and later between Aberdeen and East Midlands Airport (also for TNT). In 1985 it started providing larger cargo aircraft to TNT, by then its principal cargo customer, using wet leased Handley Page Dart Herald aircraft operating nightly from Birmingham to Nuremberg and Hannover and these were later replaced by a BAC One-Eleven jet cargo aircraft and then by a Boeing 737-200QC aircraft wet leased from Aer Lingus. When TNT announced that it would order 72 British Aerospace 146 aircraft converted to freighters, Air Foyle won the contract to operate these aircraft on behalf of TNT, then an Australian company. This operation commenced in May 1987 with one BAe 146 aircraft and rapidly expanded to ten such aircraft which Air Foyle then operated for thirteen years for TNT on a nightly schedule from various airports in the UK and mainland Europe into TNT's hub in Cologne and later Liège.

In 1985 Air Foyle took delivery of the first production Edgley EA-7 Optica aerial observation aircraft. Subsequently, while being operated by Hampshire Police this aircraft was destroyed in a fatal accident.

In 1989, following two years of negotiations with the Soviets, Air Foyle became the worldwide General Sales Agent of the Antonov Design Bureau of Kyiv and became responsible for the marketing and sales and commercial and operational management of Antonov's fleet of AN-124 heavy cargo aircraft.

Between 1998 and 2000 Air Foyle bid an AN-124 solution for the Ministry of Defence Short-Term Strategic Airlift (STSA) procurement. After a protracted procurement process, Ministers in the Ministry of Defence chose a very much more expensive Boeing C-17 solution. Air Foyle believed it had been misled during the procurement process about the basis for decision on the procurement. The Comptroller and Auditor General later concluded that the procurement process was "that the Department has not fully followed its own preferred practice in evaluating the Short Term Strategic Airlift proposals, but there is no evidence of illegality."

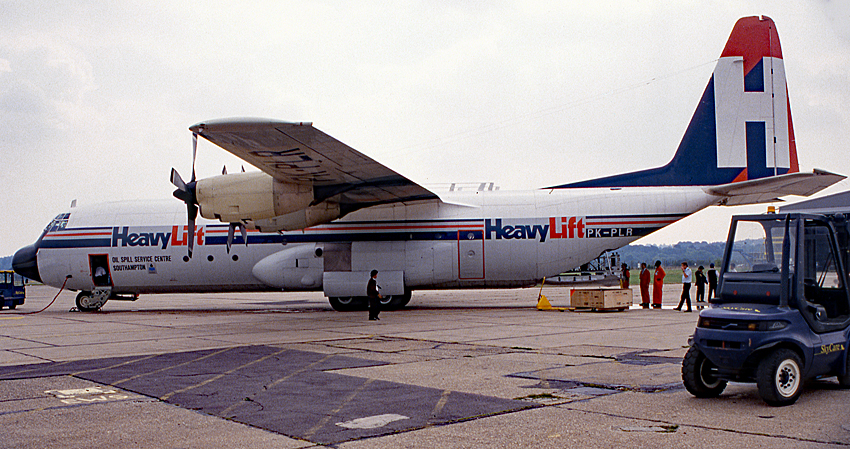
PK-PLR Lockheed Hercules L100-30 loading oil spill boom equipment

In 1994 Air Foyle won a contract to operate one Lockheed L-100 Hercules and one Ilyushin Il-76 aircraft on permanent 24/7 standby for Oil Spill Response, to provide immediate response on a worldwide basis in the event of a major oil spillage.

Adopting the TNT aircraft management principle, Air Foyle and then its sister passenger airline Air Foyle Passenger Airlines operated a variety of aircraft including Boeing 707-300F, 737-200, 737-300, 727-200, Airbus A320 and A300 for a number of airline and virtual airline customers including EasyJet, Sunseeker, Sabre, Virgin Express, Debonair, Color Air, and Air Scandic from 1993 until 2000.

=== HeavyLift, TAC Heavylift and Heavylift Cargo Airlines ===
In 1977, the Trafalgar House Group bought 90% of Transmeridian Air Cargo and on 15 August 1979 merged it with IAS Cargo Airlines to form British Cargo Airlines. In 1978 the HeavyLift division of the carrier acquired five ex-Royal Air Force Shorts Belfast freighters to operate outsized cargo and spent £4 million on the civil certification programme for the aircraft with Marshall Aerospace. British Cargo Airlines collapsed in March 1980, although HeavyLift had survived, owned two-thirds by Cunard and one-third by Eurolatin Aviation Ltd. The managing director was P.J. McGoldrick who was later CEO of Ryanair and founder of both TransAer and EU-Jet. The first load carried by a civil Belfast at HeavyLift was containerised agricultural machinery from Amsterdam to Libya. The company later founded Prime Airlines as a passenger charter operation in 2001.

In the early 1990s HeavyLift joined with the Russian Volga-Dnepr airlines to become the worldwide general sale agent for its outsized cargo operations with AN-124 aircraft. This was similar to UK rival Air Foyle which was the general sales agent for the Ukrainian AN-124 operator Antonov Airlines. Volga-Dnepr terminated the agreement in 2001 after ten years of cooperation.

HeavyLift collapsed in 2002 with the closure of HeavyLift Cargo Airlines, Prime Airlines, and HeavyLift Aircraft Engineering. The joint venture Air Foyle HeavyLift was unaffected and continued to operate until 2006. The HeavyLift name continued with two new and independent airlines, HeavyLift Cargo Airlines in Australia and HeavyLift International in the UAE, founded by former employees and investors.

== Joint Venture ==
In 2001, following Volga-Dnepr's termination of its deal with HeavyLift, the British rivals Air Foyle and HeavyLift agreed to form a joint venture responsible for the sales and marketing of charters and leases of Antonov Airline's fleet of Antonov An-124, Antonov An-225 and Antonov An-22 cargo aircraft. The venture was originally to be named Antonov Airlines (UK) but this was changed to Air Foyle HeavyLift.

The new joint venture, Air Foyle HeavyLift, became the worldwide General Sales Agent of the Antonov Design Bureau of Kyiv, a function previously held from July 1989 by Air Foyle independently.

Antonov terminated the joint venture on 30 June 2006 to allow it to pursue a joint marketing venture with its erstwhile Russian competitor Volga-Dnepr under the name Ruslan International

Air Foyle and Air Foyle HeavyLift ceased trading in July 2006, AFH closed for business on 31 July 2006.

== See also ==
- List of defunct airlines of the United Kingdom
