= Antonov An-225 Mriya =

Soviet/Ukrainian heavy strategic cargo aircraft

An-225 Mriya
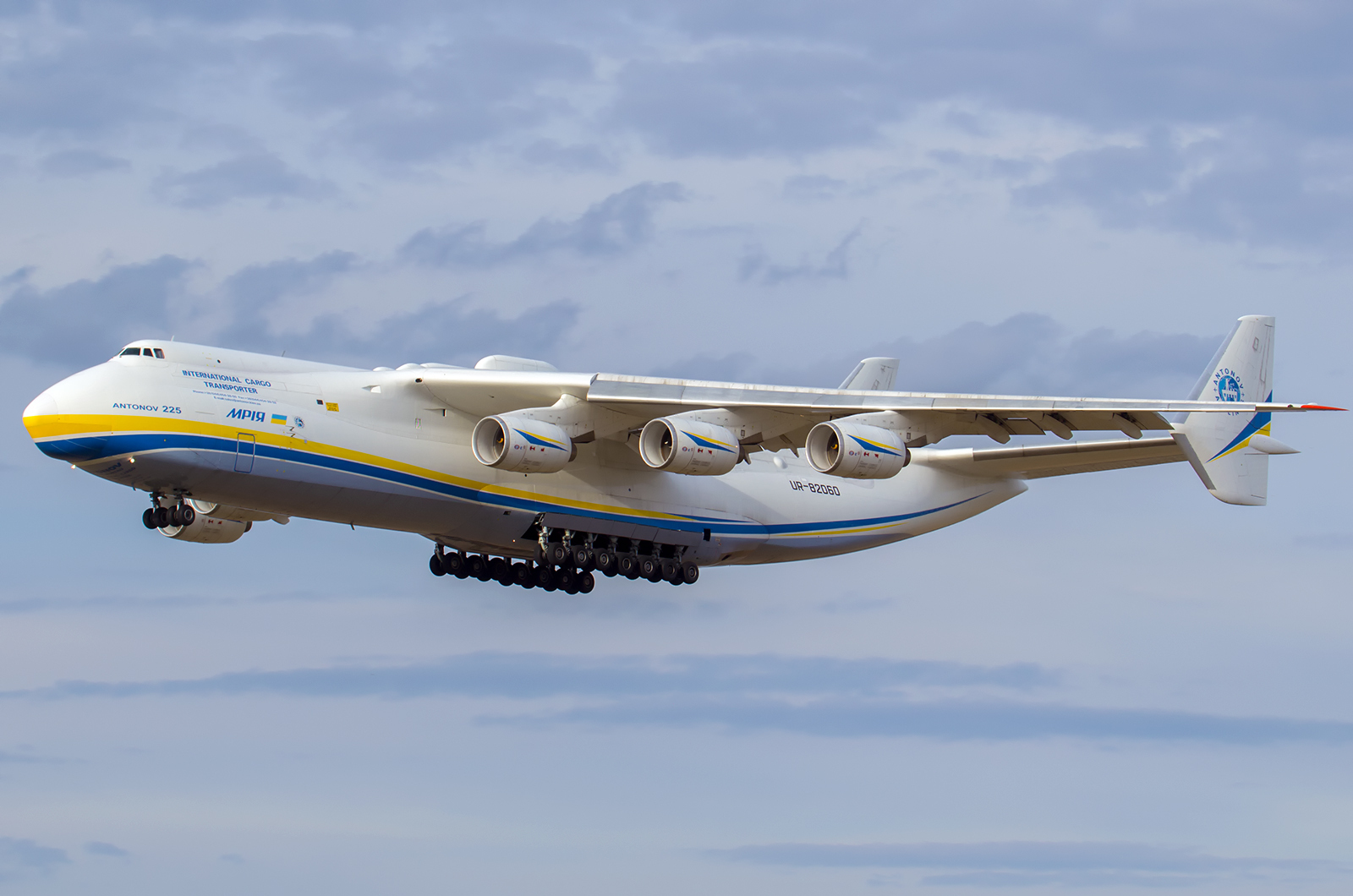
- The An-225 in its 2009–2022 livery

General information
- Role: Outsize cargo freight aircraft
- National origin: Soviet Union
- Designer: Antonov
- Built by: Antonov Serial Production Plant
- Status: Destroyed; February 27, 2022
- Primary user: Antonov Airlines
- Number built: 1

History
- Manufactured: 1985
- First flight: 21 December 1988
- Last flight: 5 February 2022
- Developed from: Antonov An-124 Ruslan

The Antonov An-225 Mriya (Ukrainian: Антонов Ан-225 Мрія meaning dream; NATO reporting name: Cossack) was a large strategic airlift cargo aircraft designed and produced by the Antonov Design Bureau in the Soviet Union.

It was originally developed during the 1980s as an enlarged derivative of the Antonov An-124 airlifter for transporting Buran-class orbiters. On 21 December 1988, the An-225 performed its maiden flight; only one aircraft was ever completed, although a second airframe with a slightly different configuration was partially built. After a brief period of use in the Soviet space program, the aircraft was mothballed during the early 1990s. Towards the turn of the century, it was decided to refurbish the An-225 and reintroduce it for commercial operations, carrying oversized payloads for the operator Antonov Airlines. Multiple announcements were made regarding the potential completion of the second airframe, though its construction largely remained on hold due to a lack of funding. By 2009, it had reportedly been brought up to 60–70% completion.

With a maximum takeoff weight of 640 tonnes (705 short tons), the An-225 held several records, including heaviest aircraft ever built and largest wingspan of any operational aircraft. It was commonly used to transport objects once thought impossible to move by air, such as 130-ton generators, wind turbine blades, and diesel locomotives. Additionally, both Chinese and Russian officials had announced separate plans to adapt the An-225 for use in their respective space programs. The Mriya routinely attracted a high degree of public interest, attaining a global following due to its size and its uniqueness.

The only completed An-225 was destroyed in the Battle of Antonov Airport during the 2022 Russian invasion of Ukraine. In 2022, Ukrainian president Volodymyr Zelenskyy announced plans to complete the second An-225 to replace the destroyed aircraft.

== Development ==
Work on the Antonov An-225 began in 1984 at the request of the Soviet government for a large airlifter to replace the Myasishchev VM-T. The specifics of this request included the ability to carry a maximum payload of 231,838 kilograms (511,116 lb), both externally and internally, while operating from any runway of at least 3,500 metres (11,500 ft). As originally set out, the mission and objectives were broadly identical to that of the United States' Shuttle Carrier Aircraft, having been designed to airlift the Energia rocket's boosters and the Buran-class orbiters for the Soviet space program. Furthermore, a relatively short timetable for the delivery of the completed aircraft meant that development would have to proceed at a rapid pace.

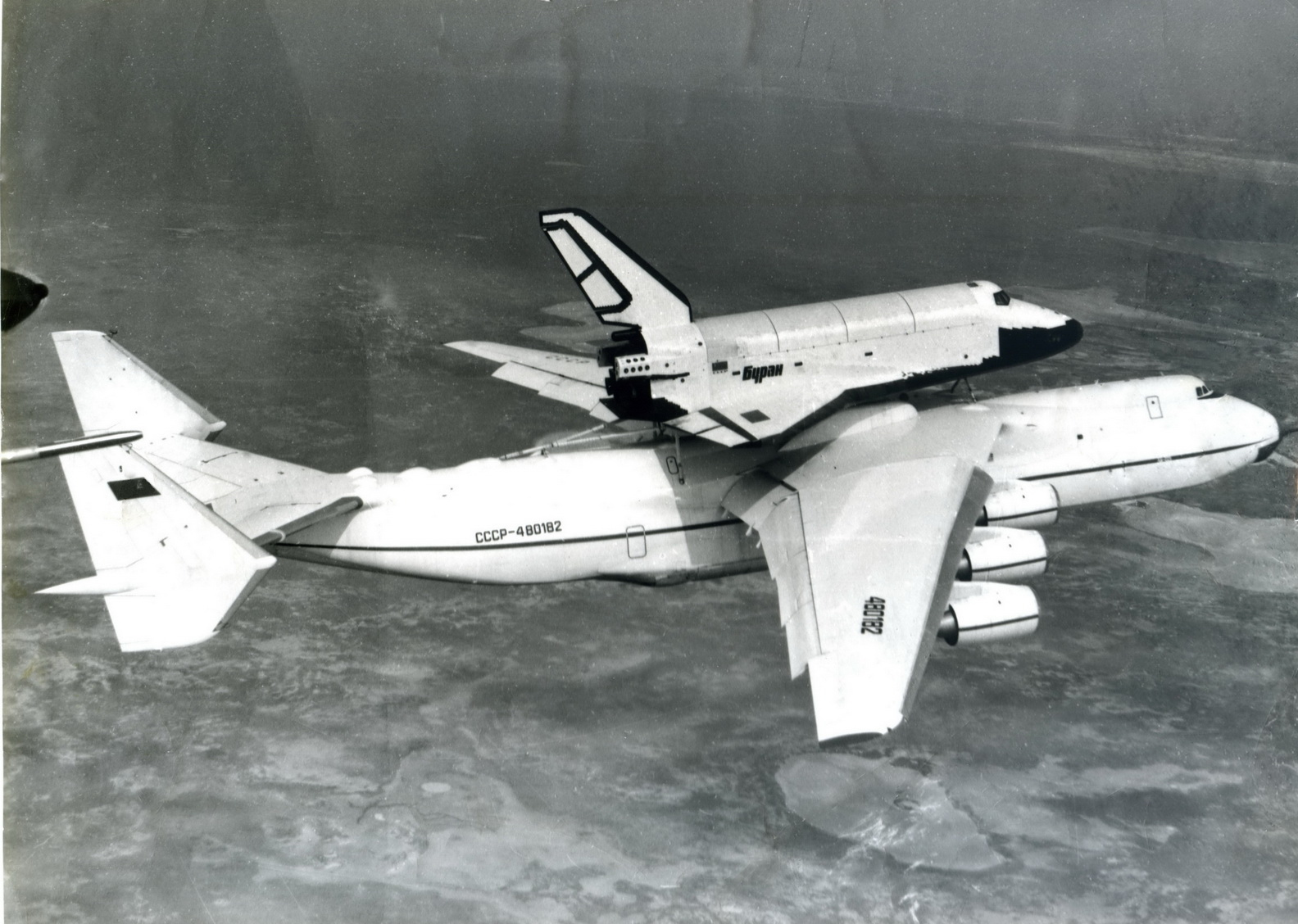
The An-225 carrying Buran (1.01) in 1989

Accordingly, the Antonov Design Bureau produced a derivative of their existing Antonov An-124 Ruslan airlifter. The aircraft was stretched via the addition of fore and aft fuselage barrel sections, while a new, enlarged wing centre was designed that facilitated the carriage of an additional pair of Progress D-18T turbofan engines, increasing the total from four to six powerplants. A completely new tail was also required to handle the wake turbulence generated by the bulky external loads that would be carried on the aircraft's upper fuselage. Despite the novelty of its scale, the design of the An-225 was largely conventional. The lead designer of the An-225 (and the An-124) was Viktor Tolmachev.

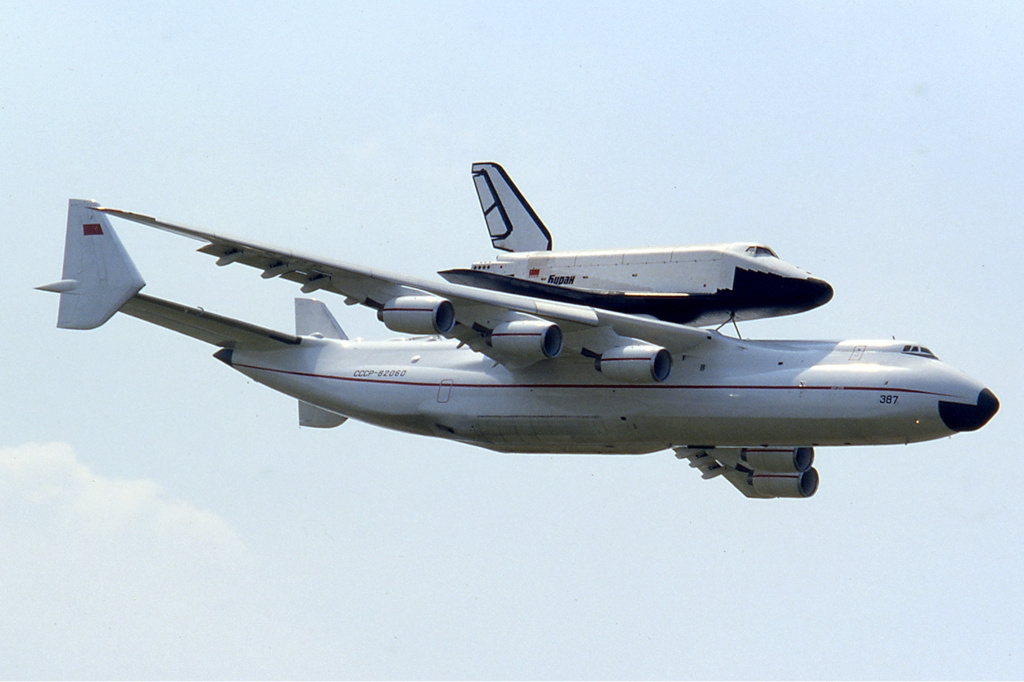
Antonov An-225 with Buran at Le Bourget, 1989, Manteufel

On 21 December 1988, the An-225 performed its maiden flight. It made its first public appearance outside the Soviet Union at the 1989 Paris Air Show where it was presented carrying a Buran orbiter. One year later, it performed a flying display for the public days at the Farnborough Air Show. While two aircraft had been ordered, only a single An-225, (registration CCCP-82060, later UR-82060) was finished. It could carry ultra-heavy and oversized freight weighing up to 250,000 kg (550,000 lb) internally or 200,000 kg (440,000 lb) on the upper fuselage. Cargo on the upper fuselage could be up to 70 m (230 ft) in length.

A second An-225 was partially built during the late 1980s for the Soviet space program; however, work on the airframe was suspended following the collapse of the Soviet Union. By 2000, the need for an additional An-225 capacity had become apparent; in September 2006, it was decided that the second An-225 would be completed, a feat that was initially scheduled for around 2008. However, the work was repeatedly delayed. By August 2009, it was reported that it had not been completed and that work had been abandoned. In May 2011, the Antonov CEO reportedly stated that the completion of the second An-225, which would have a carrying capacity of 250 tons, requires at least $300 million; upon the provision of sufficient financing, its completion could be achieved in three years. According to different sources, the second aircraft was 60–70% complete by 2016.

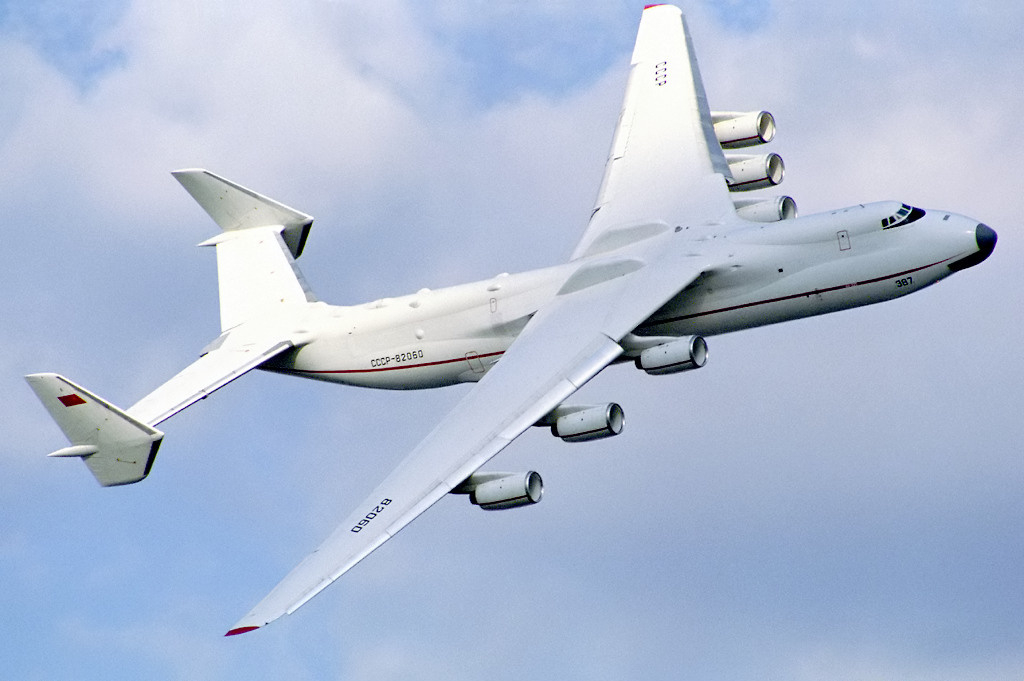
The An-225 at Farnborough in 1990

The revival of space activities involving the An-225 was repeatedly announced and speculated upon throughout its life. During the early 2000s, studies were conducted into the production of an even larger An‑225 derivative, the eight-engined Antonov An-325, which was intended to be used in conjunction with Russia's in-development MAKS space plane. In April 2013, the Russian government announced plans to revive Soviet-era air launch projects that would use a purpose-built modification to the An-225 as a midair launchpad.

In May 2017, Airspace Industry Corporation of China (AICC)'s president, Zhang You-Sheng, told a BBC reporter that AICC had first considered cooperating with Antonov in 2009 and had made contact with them two years later. AICC intends to modernize the second unfinished An-225 and develop it into an air launch to orbit platform for commercial satellites at altitudes up to 12,000 m (39,000 ft). The aviation media cast doubt on the production restart, speculating that the ongoing Russo-Ukrainian war would prevent various necessary components that would have been sourced from Russia from being delivered; it may be possible that China could manufacture them instead. That project did not move forward but UkrOboronProm, the parent company of Antonov, had continued to seek partners to finish the second airframe.

On 25 March 2020, the first An-225 commenced a series of test flights from Hostomel Airport near Kyiv, after more than a year out of service, for the installation of a domestically designed power management and control system.

== Design ==
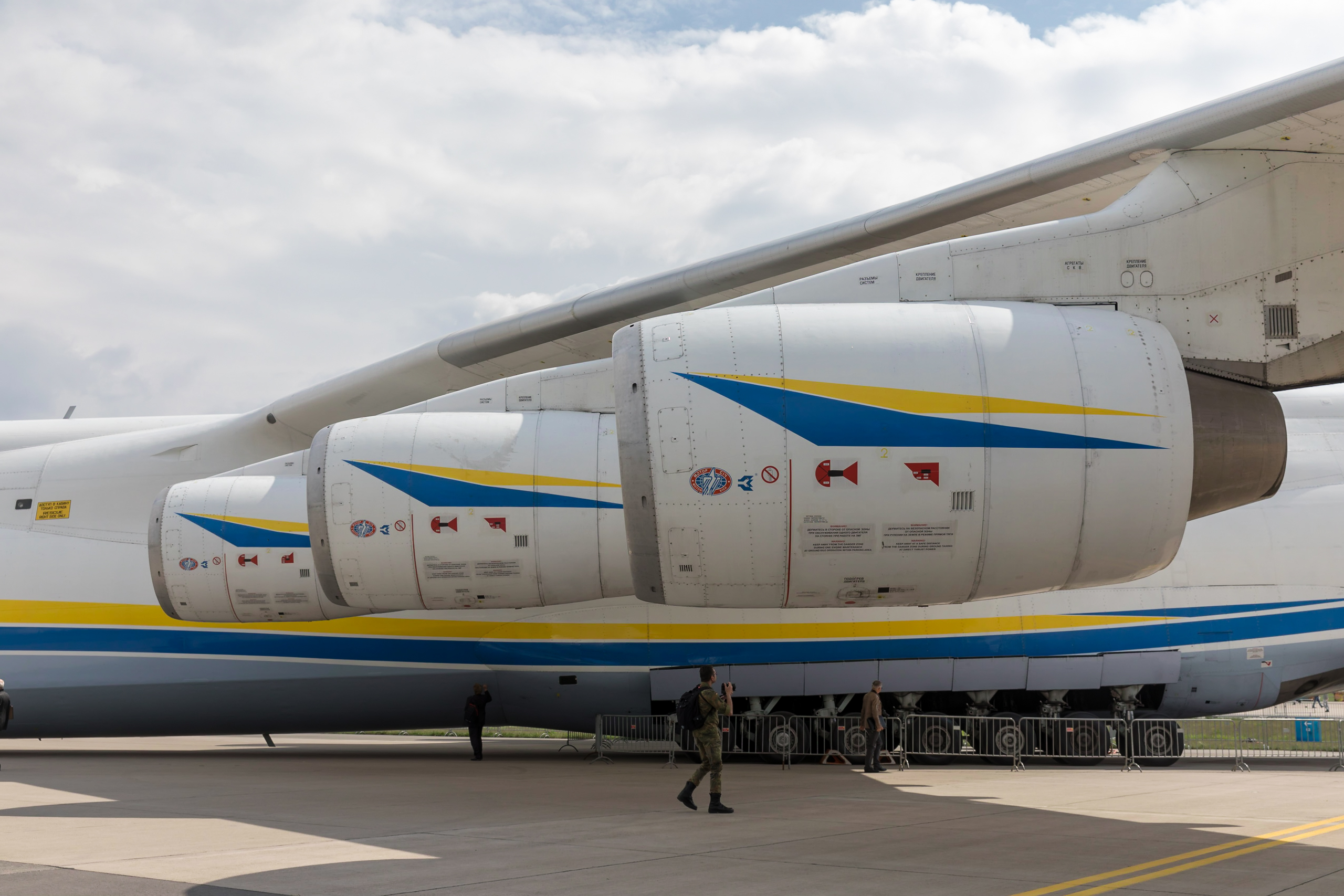
Three of six Ivchenko Progress D-18T turbofan engines on the An-225

The Antonov An-225 was a strategic airlift cargo aircraft that retained many similarities with the preceding An‑124 airlifter from which it was derived. It had a longer fuselage and cargo deck due to the addition of fuselage barrel extensions that were fitted both fore and aft of the wings. The wings, which were anhedral, also received root extensions to increase their span. The flight control surfaces were controlled via fly-by-wire and powered by triple-redundant hydraulics. Furthermore, the empennage of the An-225 was a twin tail with an oversized, swept-back horizontal stabilizer, having been redesigned from the single vertical stabilizer of the An-124. The use of a twin tail arrangement was essential to enable the aircraft to carry its bulky external loads that would generate wake turbulence, disturbing the airflow around a conventional tail.

The An-225 was powered by a total of six Progress D-18T turbofan engines, two more than the An-124, the addition of which was facilitated by the redesigned wing root area. An increased-capacity landing gear system with 32 wheels was designed, some of which are steerable; these enable the airlifter to turn within a 60-metre-wide (200 ft) runway. Akin to its An-124 predecessor, the An-225 incorporated a nose gear designed to "kneel" so cargo can be more easily loaded and unloaded. Additional measures to ease loading and unloading activities included the four overhead cargo cranes that could move along the whole length of the cargo hold, each of which was capable of lifting up to 5,000 kilograms (11,000 lb). To facilitate the attachment of external loads, such as the Buran orbiter, various mounting points were present along the upper surface of the fuselage.

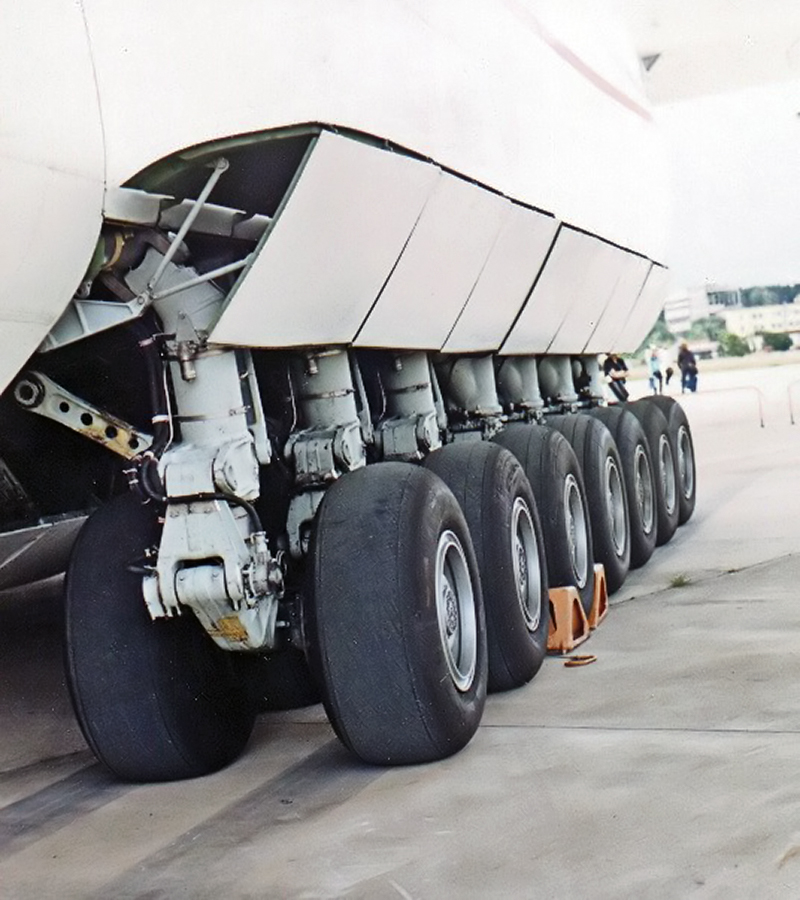
The An-225's main landing gear

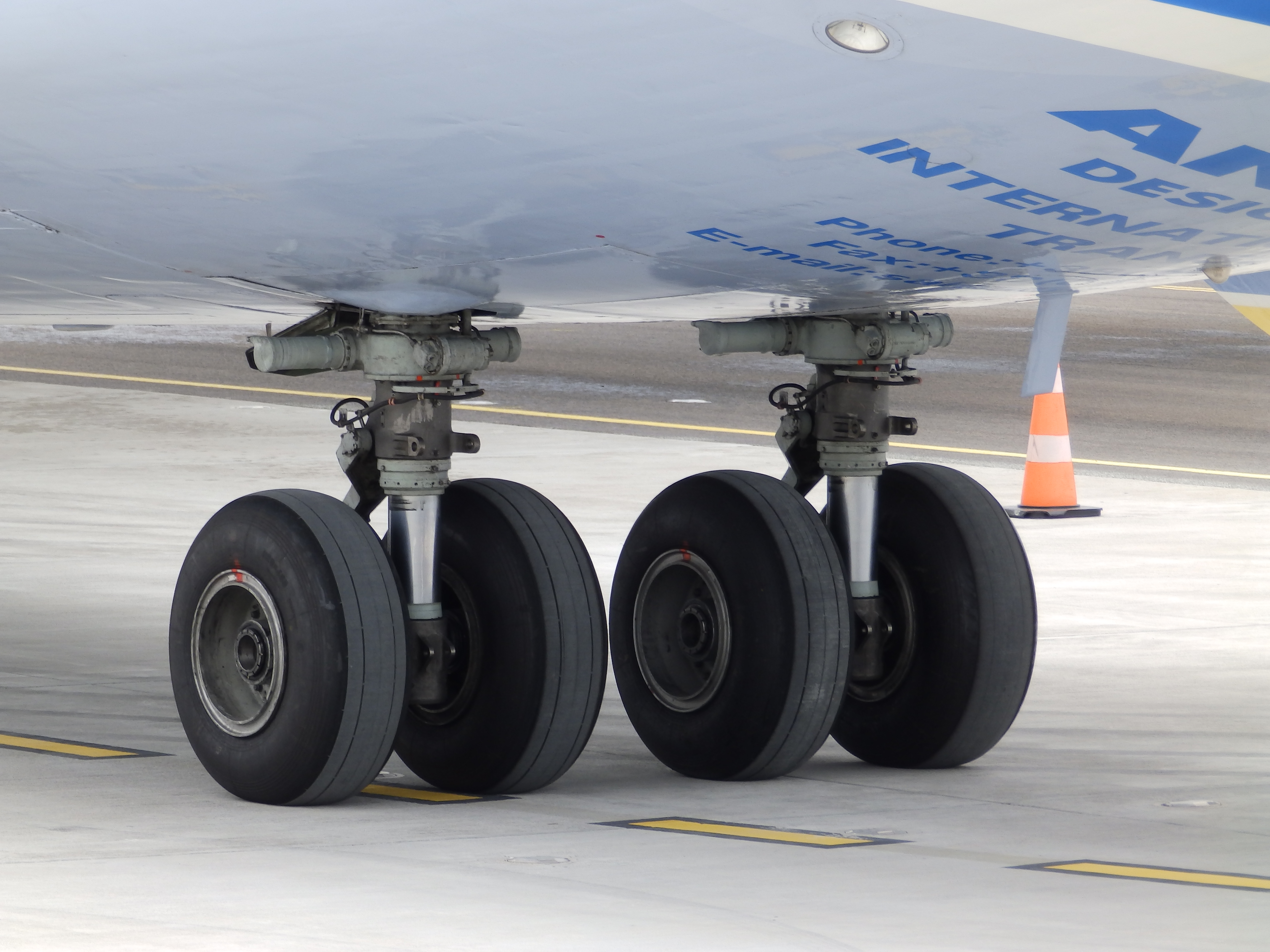
The nose gear of the An-225

Unlike the An-124, the An-225 was not intended for tactical airlifting and was not designed for short-field operations. Accordingly, the An-225 does not have a rear cargo door or ramp, as are present on the An-124, these features having been eliminated in order to save weight. The cargo hold was 1,300 m^{3} (46,000 cu ft) in volume; 6.4 m (21 ft) wide, 4.4 m (14 ft) high, and 43.35 m (142 ft 3 in) long—longer than the first flight of the Wright Flyer. The cargo hold, which was pressurized and furnished with extensive soundproofing, could contain up to 80 standard-dimension cars, 16 intermodal containers, or up to 250,000 kilograms (551,150 lb) of general cargo.

The flight deck of the An-225 was at the front of the upper deck, which was accessed via a ladder from the lower deck. This flight deck was largely identical to that of the An-124, save for the presence of additional controls to manage the additional pair of engines. To the rear of the flight deck was an array of compartments which, amongst other things, accommodated the crew stations for the aircraft's two flight engineers, navigator, and communication specialist, along with off-duty rest areas, including beds, which facilitated long range missions to be flown. Even when fully loaded, the An-225 was capable of flying non-stop across great distances, such as between New York and Los Angeles.

As originally constructed, the An-225 had a maximum gross weight of 600 t (660 short tons), however, between 2000 and 2001, the aircraft received numerous modifications at a cost of US$20 million, such as the addition of a reinforced floor, which increased the maximum gross weight to 640 t (710 short tons). Both the earlier and later takeoff weights establish the An-225 as the world's heaviest aircraft, exceeding the weight of the double-deck Airbus A380 airliner. Airbus claims to have improved upon the An-225's maximum landing weight by landing an A380 at 591.7 t (652.2 short tons) during testing. (Note: The Hughes H-4 Hercules flying boat, also known as the Spruce Goose, had a greater wingspan and overall height, but was lighter (at 113 t empty) and 20% shorter due to the materials used in its construction. The H-4 only flew once and for less than a minute, making the An-225 the largest aircraft in the world to fly multiple times.)

== Operational history ==
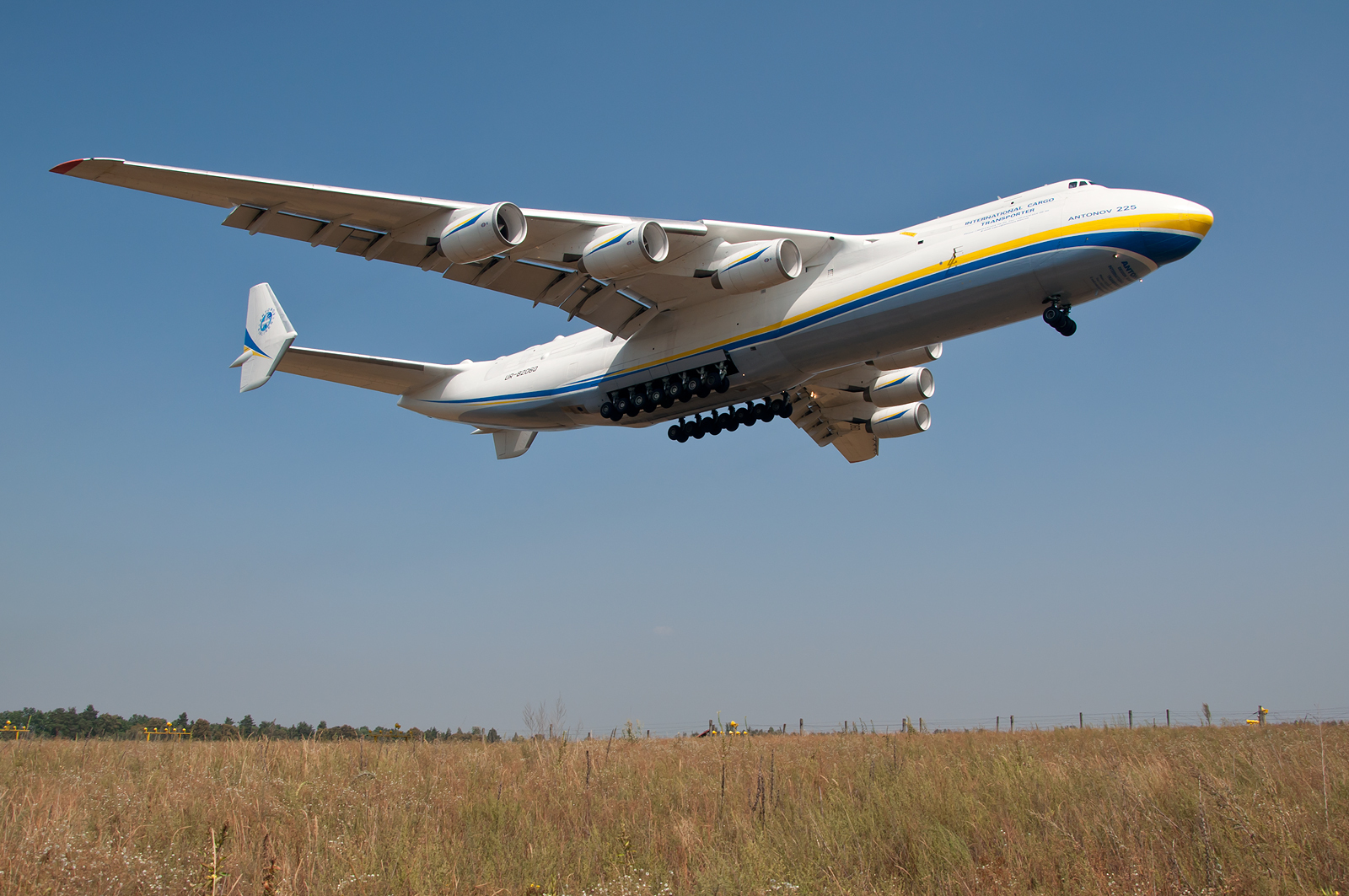
The Antonov Airlines An-225 landing at Hostomel Airport, 2014

The Antonov An-225 Mriya was originally operated between 1988 and 1991 as the prime method of transporting Buran-class orbiters for the Soviet space program. Its first pilot was Oleksandr Halunenko, who continued flying it until 2004. "Antonov Airlines" was concurrently founded in 1989 after it was set up as a holding company by the Antonov Design Bureau as a heavy airlift shipping corporation. This company was to be based in Kyiv, Ukraine, and operate from London Luton Airport in partnership with Air Foyle HeavyLift. While operations began with a fleet of four An-124-100s and three Antonov An-12s, the need for aircraft larger than the An-124 became apparent by the late 1990s.

By this time, the Soviet Union was no longer in existence and the Buran program had been terminated; consequently, the sole completed An-225 was left unused and without a purpose. As early as 1990, Antonov officials were openly speaking on their ambitions for the aircraft to enter commercial use. Despite this, in 1994, it was decided to put the An-225 into long-term storage. During this time, all six of its engines were removed for use on various An-124s, while the second uncompleted An-225 airframe was also stored. As the 1990s progressed, it became clear that there was sufficient demand for a cargo liner even bigger than the An-124. Accordingly, it was decided that the first An-225 would be restored.

The aircraft was re-engined, received modifications to modernise and better adapt it to heavy cargo transport operations, and placed back in service under the management of Antonov Airlines. It became the workhorse of the Antonov Airlines fleet, transporting objects once thought impossible to move by air, such as 130-ton generators, wind turbine blades, and even diesel locomotives. It also became an asset to international relief organizations for its ability to quickly transport huge quantities of emergency supplies during multiple disaster-relief operations.

Under Antonov Airlines, the An-225 received its type certificate from the Interstate Aviation Committee Aviation Register (IAC AR) on 23 May 2001. The type's first flight in commercial service departed from Stuttgart, Germany, on 3 January 2002, and flew to Thumrait, Oman, with 216,000 prepared meals for American military personnel based in the region. This vast number of ready meals was transported on 375 pallets and weighed 187.5 tons. The An-225 was later contracted by the Canadian and U.S. governments to transport military supplies to the Middle East in support of coalition forces. An example of the cost of shipping cargo by An-225 was over 2 million kr. (about €266,000) for flying a chimney duct from Billund, Denmark, to Kazakhstan in 2004.

During 2016, Antonov Airlines ceased cooperation with Air Foyle and partnered with Volga-Dnepr instead. This led to the An-225's blue and yellow paint scheme, added in 2009. These matched the colors of the Ukrainian flag and led to the An-225 becoming "Ukraine's winged ambassador to the world," in the words of The New York Times.

When the COVID-19 pandemic impacted the world in early 2020, the An-225 participated in the relief effort by conducting flights to deliver medical supplies from China to other parts of the world.

The aircraft was popular with aviation enthusiasts, who frequently visited airports to view its scheduled arrivals and departures. During its 2016 visit to Perth, its first and only visit to Australia, thousands of observers crowded the roads around Perth Airport, creating traffic jams which prevented some passengers from catching their flights.

=== Records ===
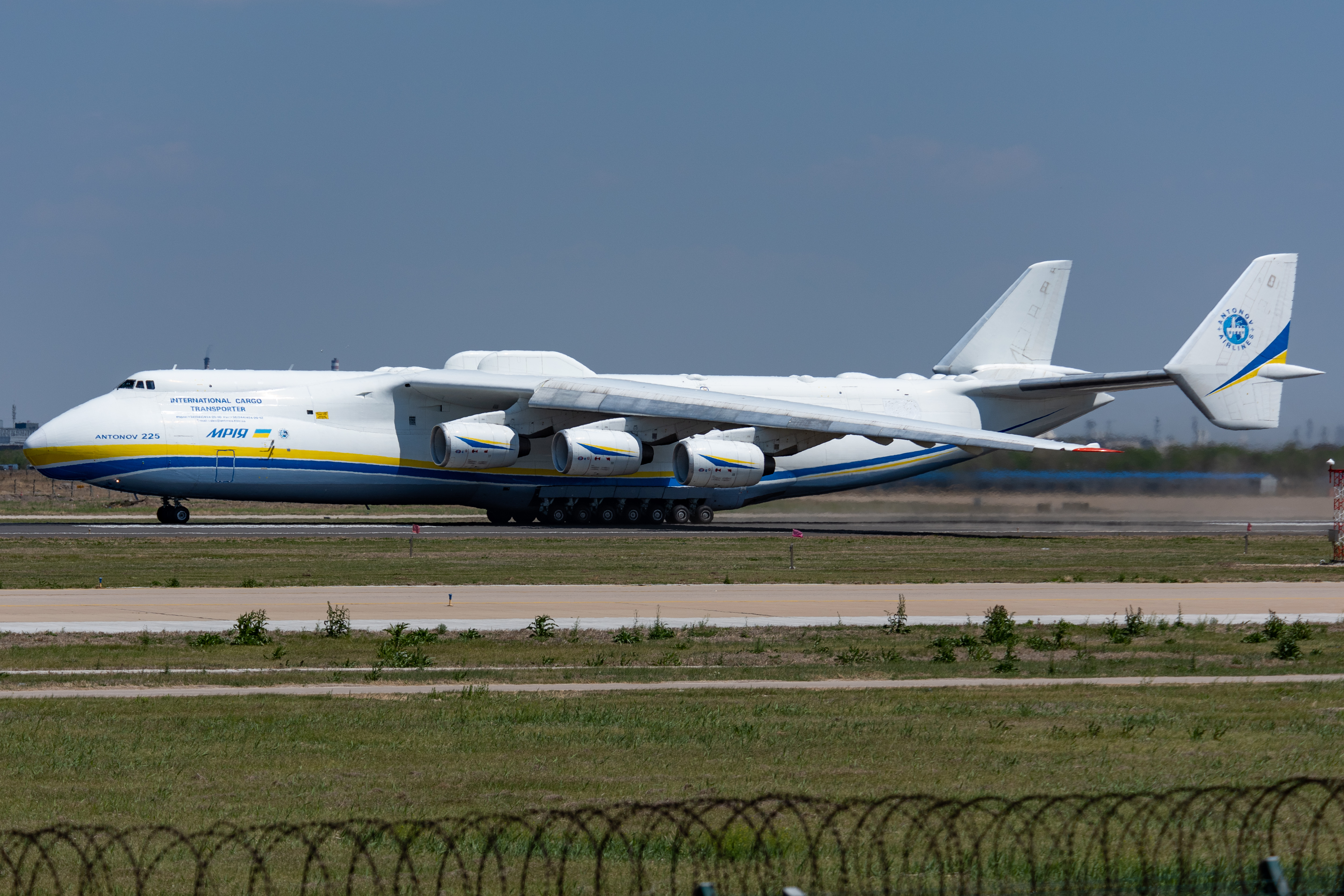
An-225 at Tianjin Binhai International Airport

On 11 September 2001, carrying five main battle tanks at a record load of 253.82 tonnes (279.79 short tons) of cargo, the An-225 flew at an altitude of up to 10,750 m (35,270 ft) over a closed circuit of 1,000 km (620 mi) at a speed of 763.2 km/h (474.2 mph). During 2017, the hired cost was US$30,000 (£23,220) per hour.

On 11 August 2009, the heaviest single cargo item ever sent by air was loaded onto the An-225. At 16.23 m (53 ft 3 in) long and 4.27 m (14 ft 0 in) wide, its consignment, a generator for a gas power plant in Armenia along with its loading frame, represented a payload of 189,980 kg (418,830 lb), It also transported a total payload of 247,000 kg (545,000 lb) on a commercial flight.

On 11 June 2010, the An-225 carried the world's longest piece of air cargo, two 42.1 m (138 ft) test wind turbine blades from Tianjin, China, to Skrydstrup, Denmark.

On 27 September 2012, the An-225 hosted the highest altitude art exhibition in the world at 10,150 metres (33,301 feet) above sea level during the AviaSvit-XX1 Aerospace Show at Antonov Airport. The exhibition was part of the Globus Gallery based in Kyiv and consisted of 500 artworks by 120 Ukrainian artists.

In total, the An-225 has set 240 world records, which is unique in aviation.

=== Destruction ===
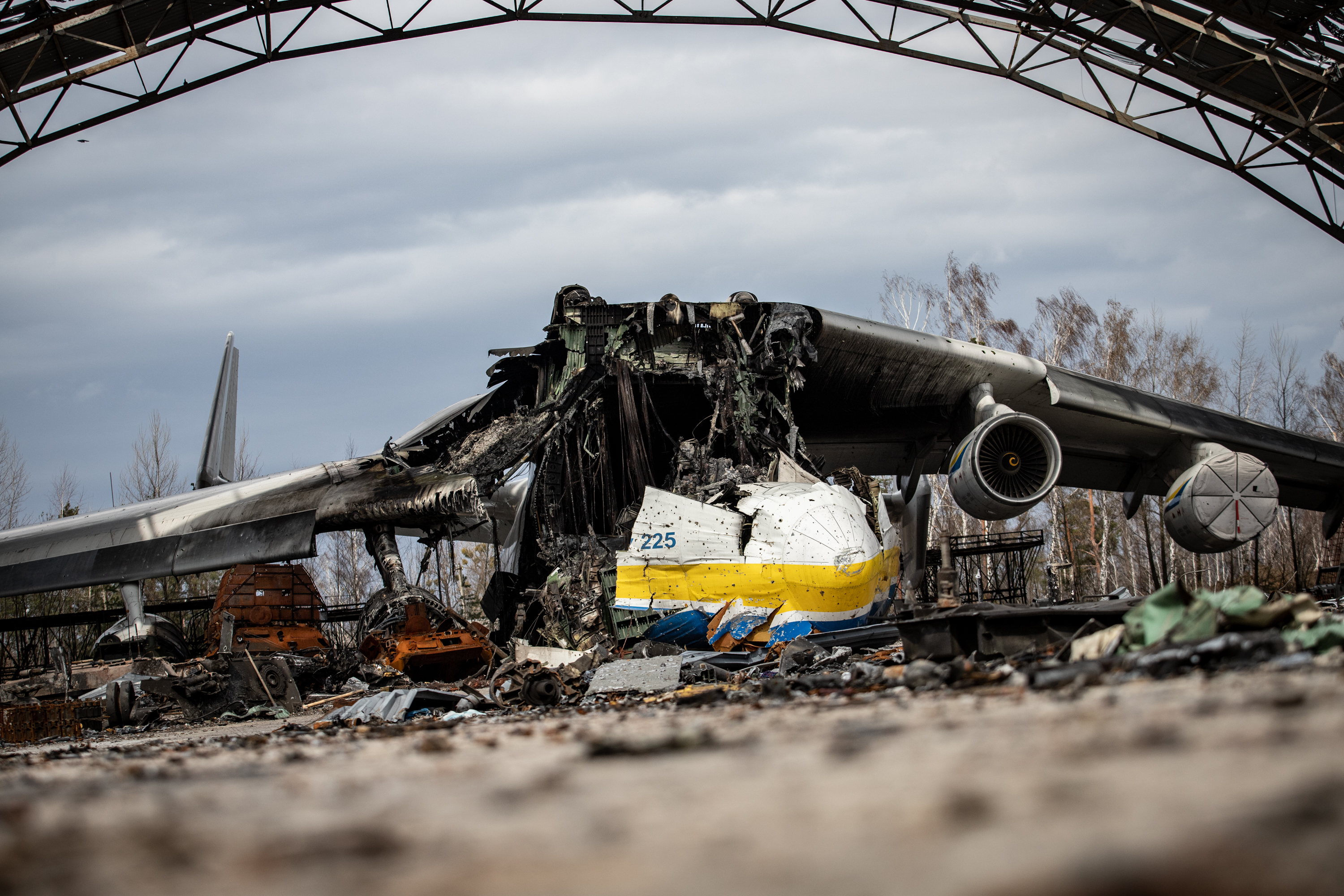
Wreckage of the An-225 Mriya from the front, after its destruction during the Battle of Antonov Airport

The aircraft's last commercial mission was from 2 to 5 February 2022, to collect almost 90 tons of COVID-19 test kits from Tianjin, China, and deliver them to Billund, Denmark, via Bishkek, Kyrgyzstan. From there, it returned on 5 February to its base at Antonov Airport in Hostomel, where it underwent an engine swap. On the advice of NATO, it was prepared for evacuation, scheduled for the morning of 24 February, but on that day Russia invaded, with the airfield being one of their first targets. A ban on civilian flights was quickly enacted by Ukrainian authorities. During the ensuing Battle of Antonov Airport, the runway was rendered unusable.

On 24 February, the An-225 was said to be intact. On 27 February, a photo was posted on Twitter of an object tentatively identified as the An-225 on fire in its hangar. A report by the Ukrainian edition of Radio Liberty stated that the airplane was destroyed during the Battle of Antonov Airport, which was repeated by Foreign Minister Dmytro Kuleba and by Ukroboronprom, Antonov's parent organisation. The Antonov company initially refused to confirm or deny the reports, and said it was still investigating them.

Also on 27 February 2022, a press release by Ukroboronprom stated that the An-225 had been destroyed by Russian forces. Several other aircraft were in the same hangar as the An-225 at the time of its destruction, and were also destroyed or damaged during the battle; these include a Hungarian-registered Cessna 152, which was crushed by the An-225's left wingtip after the latter fell on top of it.

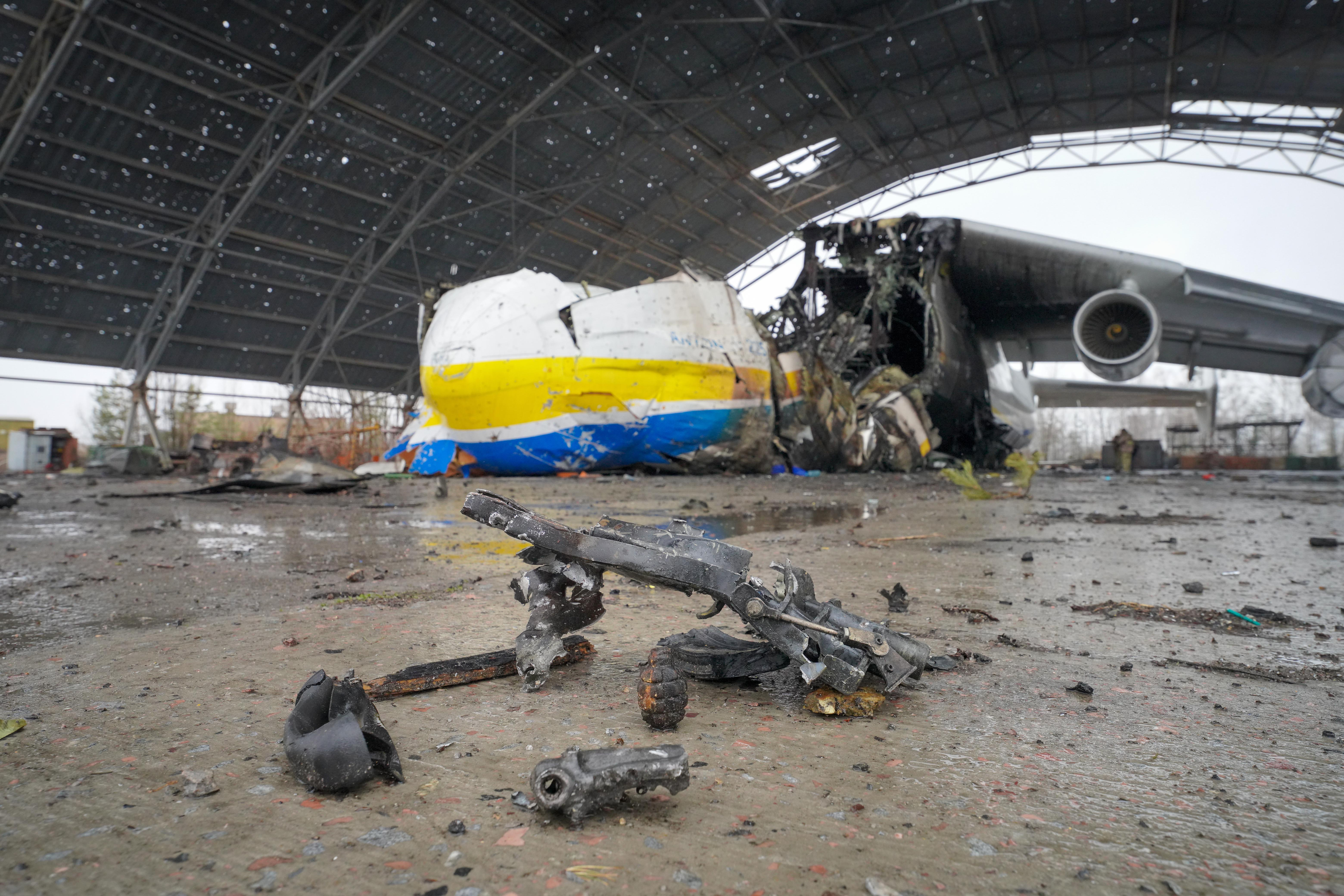
Remains of the Antonov An-225 Mriya

Ukroboronprom said that they planned to rebuild the plane at the Russians' expense. The statement said: "The restoration is estimated to take over 3 billion USD and over five years. Our task is to ensure that these costs are covered by the Russian Federation, which has caused intentional damage to Ukraine's aviation and the air cargo sector." The Ukrainian government also said that it would be rebuilt.

=== Aftermath ===
Destroyed Mriya
- The New York Times, April 2022
- The New York Times, March 2023

On 1 March, a new photograph, taken since the initial conflict, was tentatively identified as the tail of the aircraft protruding from its hangar, suggesting that it remained at least partly intact. However, further evidence proved to show that the aircraft is inoperable due to the extreme damage it sustained. On 3 March, a video circulated on social media, showing the aircraft burning inside the hangar alongside several Russian trucks, confirming its likely destruction. Nonetheless, Antonov reiterated that until experts inspect the aircraft, its official status cannot be fully determined. On 4 March, footage on Russian state television Channel One showed the first clear ground images of the destroyed aircraft, with much of the front section missing. Following Russia's withdrawal from northern Ukraine, the second unfinished aircraft airframe was reported to be intact, despite Russian artillery strikes on the hangar housing it at the Antonov factory at Sviatoshyn Airfield.

Major Dmytro Antonov, the pilot of the An-225, alleged on 19 March 2022 that Antonov Airlines knew that an invasion was imminent for quite some time, but did nothing to prevent the loss of the aircraft. On his YouTube channel, Antonov accused company management of not doing enough to prevent the destruction of the aircraft, after having been advised by NATO to move the aircraft (ready to fly status) to Leipzig, Germany, in advance. Multiple Antonov staff have denied his allegations.

On 1 April, drone footage of Hostomel Airport showed the destroyed Mriya, with the forward fuselage completely burned and the wings partly intact. It was later revealed that the right wing had been broken, but was held up only by its engines resting on the ground.

Investigations into rebuilding the An-225 are underway, including the possibility of cannibalising the second, incomplete An-225 or salvaging the remnants of the first plane to finish the second. However, several obstacles stand in the way of rebuilding. Many of the aircraft's Soviet-made components were from the 1980s and are no longer made. Engineers quote a price of US$350–500 million, although there is uncertainty about whether it would be commercially viable and worth the cost. However, Andrii Sovenko, a former An-225 pilot and aviation author, said:

It's impossible to talk about the repair or restoration of this aircraft – we can only talk about the construction of another Mriya, using individual components that can be salvaged from the wreckage and combining them with those that were, back in the 1980s, intended for the construction of a second aircraft.

On 20 May 2022, Ukrainian president Volodymyr Zelenskyy announced his intentions to complete the second An-225, to replace the destroyed aircraft and as a tribute to all the Ukrainian pilots killed during the war. In November 2022, Antonov confirmed plans to rebuild the aircraft at an estimated cost of $500 million. At the time, the company did not state whether parts from the wrecked aircraft and the incomplete airframe would be combined to create a new flying aircraft or where funding might come from. Four months later, Antonov confirmed that parts had been removed from the wrecked aircraft for future mating to the unfinished fuselage.

In March 2023, the Ukrainian government announced that it had detained two of three Antonov officials suspected of preventing the Ukrainian National Guard from setting up defenses at Hostomel Airport in anticipation of an invasion.

In April 2023, Ukrainian prosecutors charged the former head of Antonov, Serhii Bychkov, with "official negligence" for failing to order that the aircraft be flown to Leipzig, Germany, ahead of the Russian invasion. The Ukraine Security Service (SBU), which investigated the case, stated, "according to the investigation, on the eve of the full-scale invasion, the An-225 was in proper technical condition, which allowed it to fly outside Ukraine. Instead, the general director of the company did not give appropriate instructions regarding the evacuation of Mriya abroad. Such criminal actions of the official led to the destruction of the Ukrainian transport plane."

== Former operators ==
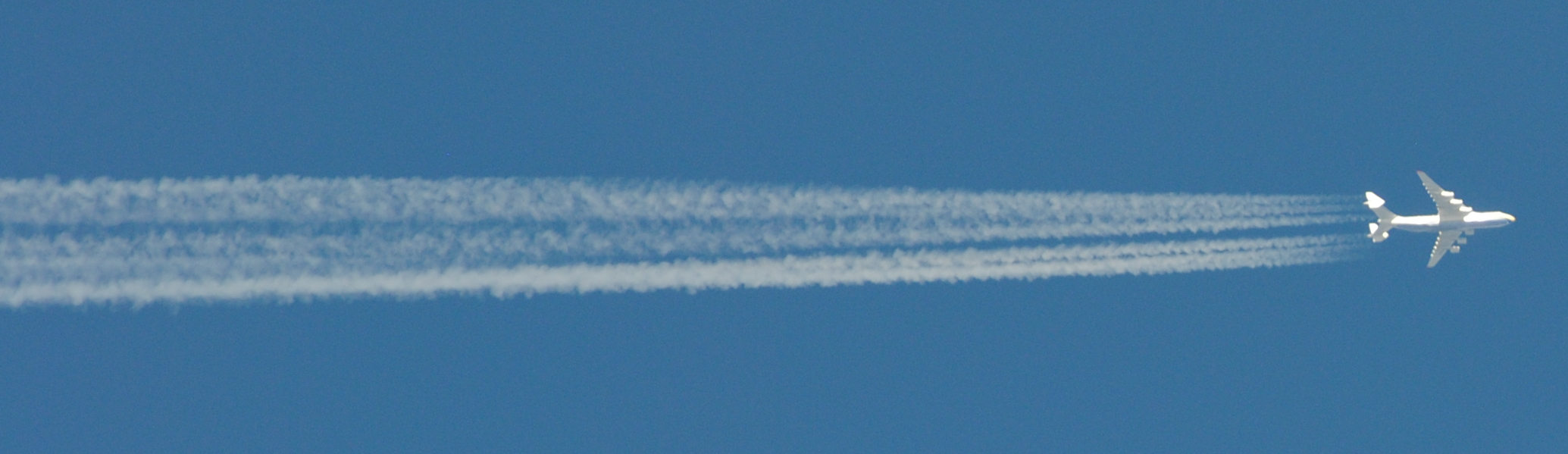
When at altitude, the An-225 had distinctive sextuple contrails.

Soviet Union

- Antonov Airlines for Soviet Buran program, the company (and aircraft) passed to Ukraine after the dissolution of the Soviet Union.

Ukraine

- Antonov Airlines for commercial operations from 3 January 2002, until 24 February 2022, the sole aircraft was destroyed during the Battle of Antonov Airport.

== Variants ==
An-224
Original proposal with a rear cargo door. None were built.

An-225
Variant without the rear cargo door. One built, second aircraft in incomplete state.

An-225-100
Designation applied to the An-225 after its 2000 modernization. Upgrades included a traffic collision avoidance system, improved communications and navigation equipment, and noise reduction features.

An-325

Proposed enlarged, eight-engined aircraft, specifically designed to launch spacecraft of various purposes into orbit. Initially designed for the MAKS program, the An-325 eventually evolved to a joint cooperation between British Aerospace and the Soviet Ministry of Aviation Industry as a part of the Interim HOTOL program. It remains unbuilt.

AKS
Intended to carry the Tupolev OOS air-launch-to-orbit spaceplane; a twin-fuselage design consisting of two An-225 fuselages, with the OOS to be carried under the raised center wing. Multiple engine configurations were proposed, ranging from 18 Progress D-18T turbofans to as many as 40 engines, with placements both above and below the wings. An alternative design for the AKS was to use entirely new fuselages, each with a single tail. The AKS was deemed unfeasible, and no prototypes were ever built.

== Specifications (An-225-100) ==
The Antonov An-225 Mriya taking off at Hostomel Airport

Data from Antonov's Heavy Transports, and others

General characteristics

- Crew: 6; 2 pilots, 2 navigators, and 2 flight engineers
- Capacity: 253.82 tonnes (559,600 lb)
- Length: 84 m (275 ft 7 in)
- Wingspan: 88.4 m (290 ft 0 in)
- Height: 18.1 m (59 ft 5 in)
- Wing area: 905 m^{2} (9,740 sq ft)
- Aspect ratio: 8.6
- Empty weight: 285,000 kg (628,317 lb)
- Max takeoff weight: 640,000 kg (1,410,958 lb)
- Fuel capacity: more than 300,000 kg (660,000 lb); 375,000 L (82,488 imp gal; 99,065 US gal)
- Cargo hold: volume 1,300 m^{3} (46,000 cu ft), 43.35 m (142.2 ft) long × 6.4 m (21 ft) wide × 4.4 m (14 ft) tall
- Powerplant: 6 × Progress D-18T turbofans, 229.5 kN (51,600 lbf) thrust each

Performance

- Maximum speed: 850 km/h (530 mph, 460 kn)
- Cruise speed: 800 km/h (500 mph, 430 kn)
- Range: 15,400 km (9,600 mi, 8,300 nmi) with maximum fuel; range with 200 tonnes payload: 4,000 km (2,500 mi)
- Service ceiling: 11,000 m (36,000 ft)
- Wing loading: 662.9 kg/m^{2} (135.8 lb/sq ft)
- Thrust/weight: 0.234

== See also ==
Related development

- Antonov An-124 Ruslan

Aircraft of comparable role, configuration, and era

- Boeing 747 Shuttle Carrier Aircraft
- Lockheed C-5 Galaxy
- Myasishchev VM-T

Related lists

- List of large aircraft
- List of military aircraft of the Soviet Union and the CIS
