= Ulyanovsk Vostochny Airport =

Cargo airport in Ulyanovsk, Russia

Ulyanovsk Vostochny Airport Аэропорт Ульяновск-Восточный
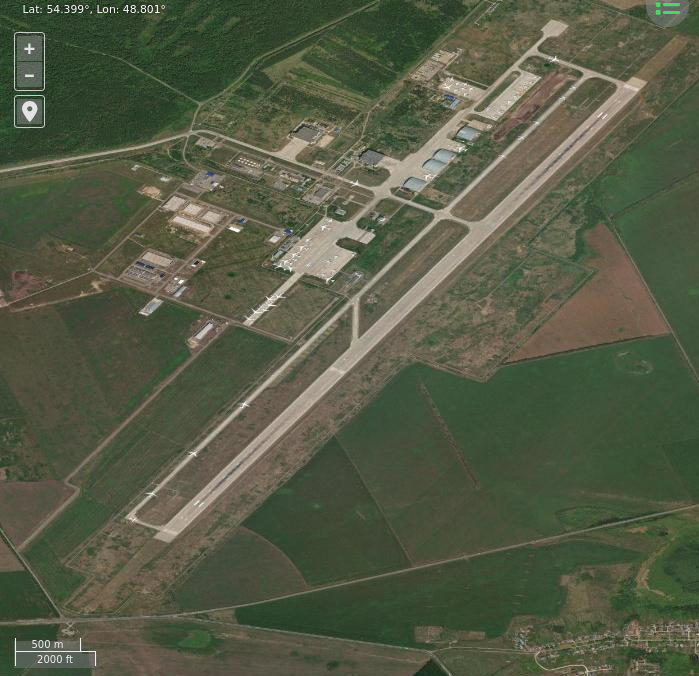
- Satellite imagery of Ulyanovsk Vostochny Airport
- IATA: ULY; ICAO: UWLW

Summary
- Airport type: Public
- Location: Ulyanovsk, Ulyanovsk Oblast, Russia
- Hub for: Volga-Dnepr Airlines
- Elevation AMSL: 77 m (253 ft)
- Coordinates: 54°23′58″N 48°48′04″E
- Website: Russian

Maps
- Ulyanovsk Oblast in Russia

- Location of the airport in the Ulyanovsk Oblast

Runways
Direction	Length		Surface
Direction	m	ft	Surface
02/20	5,000	16,404	Reinforced Concrete
- Sources: Russian AIP, WAD, GCM, STV

Ulyanovsk Vostochny Airport (sometimes referred to as Ul'yanovsk or Ulyanovsk Northeast) (IATA: ULY, ICAO: UWLW) is an airport in Russia located 28 kilometres (17 mi) northeast of Ulyanovsk. Its runway is tied with Shigatse Peace Airport in China as the longest public use runway in the world with a length of 5,000 metres (16,000 ft). The runway is also the widest, with a total width of about 105 metres (344 ft). The airport also features a very long taxiway that connects to the local Aviastar plant. This airport is mainly a cargo airport. It was founded in 1983 as a test site for the neighbouring Aviastar plant. It is a base for Volga-Dnepr Airlines. Also located here is Aviastar-SP, the manufacturer of the Antonov An-124 and Tupolev Tu-204.

From 1995-98 the 235th Independent Military Transport Aviation Regiment was located on the field with Ilyushin Il-76 and Antonov An-22 aircraft.

In March 2012, Russian foreign minister Sergei Lavrov offered Ulyanovsk Vostochny Airport for NATO use as a hub for non-lethal cargo and for ferrying personnel.

== See also ==
- Ulyanovsk Baratayevka Airport
- Samara Kurumoch Airport
- List of airports in Russia
