= Aviastar-SP =

Russian aircraft manufacturer

Coordinates: 54°21′59″N 48°36′58″E

- Type: Closed joint-stock company
- Founded: 1998; 28 years ago
- Headquarters: Ulyanovsk, Russia
- Revenue: 88,800,000 United States dollar (1994)
- Parent: United Aircraft Corporation
- Website: aviastar-sp.ru at the Wayback Machine (archived 2022-04-15)

CJSC Aviastar-SP (Russian: «Авиастар-СП») is a Russian aircraft factory based in Ulyanovsk and founded in 1976. It is a closed shares joint stock company. It replaced the Soviet Ulyanovsk Aviation Industrial Complex and manufactures the cargo aircraft An-124 Ruslan, Il-76 and the whole Tu-204 family (except Tu-214).

== History ==
Designed from scratch in the early 1970s to produce a new generation of strategic bombers, the Ulyanovsk Aviation Production Complex (renamed Aviastar in November 1991 when it became a joint stock enterprise) is said to be the largest aviation production facility in the world and one of the newest in Russia.

It produces the An-124 long-range heavy transport aircraft and the 200-seat Tu-204 medium-range airliner. Ulyanovsk was originally intended to have airframe, avionics, and engine manufacturing facilities all in one complex, but the avionics and engine facilities have not been completed. The facility is connected to the Ulyanovsk Vostochny Airport via an extended taxiway.

The plant also owns 40,000 acres of arable land on which it produced agricultural goods for its workers and for sale in the early 1990s. In 2007, 1.25% of Aviastar-SP capital has been injected into United Aircraft Corporation by the Russian Federation.

== Operation ==
Aviastar-SP JSC, together with JSC IL and UAC-Transport Aircraft, is implementing a project to produce the Il-76MD-90A heavy transport aircraft, a modification of the Il-76 aircraft. Significant changes have been made to the design of the new aircraft: the wing and center section structures have been modernized, the landing gear has been strengthened, and upgraded engines have been installed. The on-board electronic and navigation system has been significantly changed, which includes modern digital equipment.

The company is producing a Il-78M-90A tanker based on the IL-76. Ministry of Defence of Russia plans to use the aircraft not only for refueling aircraft, but also for transporting goods and extinguishing fires.

Aviastar-SP JSC performs maintenance and deep modernization of aircraft An-124 Ruslan.

Aviastar-SP JSC participates in cooperation on the production of a promising medium-haul passenger aircraft MC-21. The main components manufactured by Aviastar-SP JSC are: assembly wing root and plumage, manufacture of hatches and doors, fuselage panels, F5 compartment, APU compartment, high-resource pipeline, interior installation.

Together with the Voronezh Aviation Plant, Aviastar-SP JSC participates in a new large-scale project to prepare the production of a light transport aircraft Il-112. According to the cooperation, Aviastar-SP JSC produces panels for fuselage compartments F-1, F-2, F-3, hatches and doors.

Aviastar-SP JSC participates in the implementation of the Il-114-300 Regional Aircraft project: fuselage panels for IL-114-300 (skin, stringers, rims, compensators), hatches and doors are assembled at the Aviastar-SP JSC site.

== Owners and management ==
The leaders of UAPK—Aviastar:

- Systsov Apollon Sergeevich (1975-1980) — the first General director of the UPAC;
- Abdulin Fen Zagidovich (1980-1985);
- Mikhail Prokofievich Pilnik (1986-1990);
- Mikhailov Viktor Vasilyevich (1990—1997);
- Gennady Ivanovich Korotnev (1997-2000);
- Ryazanov Yuri Viktorovich (2001);
- Mikhailov Viktor Vasilyevich (2001-2008);
- Mikhail Nikolaevich Shushpanov (2008-2010);
- Sergey Gennadievich Dementiev (2010-2016);
- Since March 2016 Andrey Anatolyevich Kapustin has been Managing Director of Aviastar-SP;
- Since January 2017 Sergey Yurasov has been Managing Director of Aviastar-SP;
- Since May 3, 2018 Vasily Nikolaevich Dontsov has been appointed Acting Managing Director of Aviastar-SP JSC;
- Since September 2020 Sergey Konstantinovich Sheremetov has been Managing Director of Aviastar-SP JSC, and V. V. Nikulin has been Chairman of the Board of Directors.
