= Outreach Offshore Ltd =

Scottish crane supplier

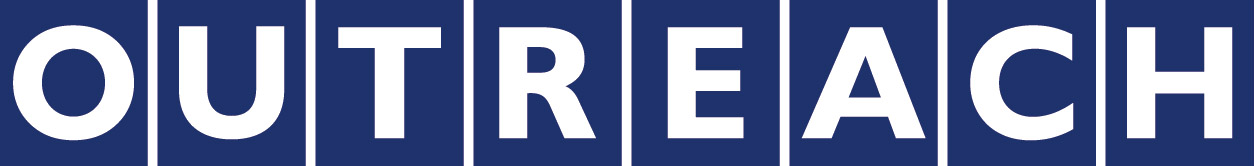
- Formerly: Outreach Ltd
- Company type: Private
- Founded: 2018
- Headquarters: Falkirk, Scotland
- Brands: Outreach Offshore Ltd; Palfinger Marine
- Services: Outreach Offshore Access; Outreach Offshore Service & Maintenance; Outreach Offshore Training
- Website: www.outreachoffshore.co.uk

Outreach Offshore Ltd is a supplier of hydraulic cranes, lifting and access equipment. The company was founded in 1990 and its headquarters are in Falkirk, Scotland. Formerly a division of Outreach Ltd, Outreach Offshore continued after the formal disbanding of the parent company in May 2018.

== History ==
Formed in 1990 from the Engineering Division of James Jones & Sons in Larbert, Outreach Ltd continued the partnership with Palfinger which started in 1976. It is the Scottish supplier for Palfinger and the UK supplier for Palfinger Epsilon.

Outreach Access was launched in 2011, offering a range of truck, van, specialist mounted access platforms, scissors and booms.

On 31 July 2014, Outreach Ltd acquired Norfolk-based Tech Safe Systems Ltd, specialists in the design, engineering and manufacture of LARS, Control Cabins and Workshops for ROVs, used most commonly in deep water industries such as oil and gas and offshore renewables.

In May 2018 Outreach Ltd disbanded and Outreach Offshore Ltd was created. The Outreach Truck element of Outreach Ltd was acquired by T H WHITE Ltd as part of its lorry cranes division, which was rebranded as Palfinger UK.

== outreach Ltd scope ==
Outreach Ltd operated both nationally and, for some of its products, internationally. It is involved in a wide range of industry sectors such as:

- Offshore Oil and Gas
- Marine
- Renewable Energy
- Construction
- Transport and Distribution
- Timber
- Waste Management and Recycling
- Emergency Services
- Local Authorities and Roads
- General Industrial

== Products ==
Outreach Ltd supplied and installed a range of products manufactured by Palfinger and Palfinger Marine. Outreach Ltd are the Scottish suppliers of the Palfinger products including:

- Knuckle-boom Cranes
- Epsilon Timber and Recycling Cranes
- Hook and Skip Loaders
- Marine Cranes
- Offshore Cranes
- Davit Systems
- Boats

Outreach Ltd was a dealer and importer for Alucar Oy Timber Bunks and Superstructures with whom it has worked for 30 years.

== Training ==
Outreach Ltd provided training courses including:

- International Powered Access Federation (IPAF)
- Association of Lorry Loader Manufacturer's and Importers Training (ALLMI)
- Prefabricated Access Suppliers and Manufacturers Association Training (PASMA)
