= Putzmeister =

German construction equipment company

Putzmeister Holding GmbH
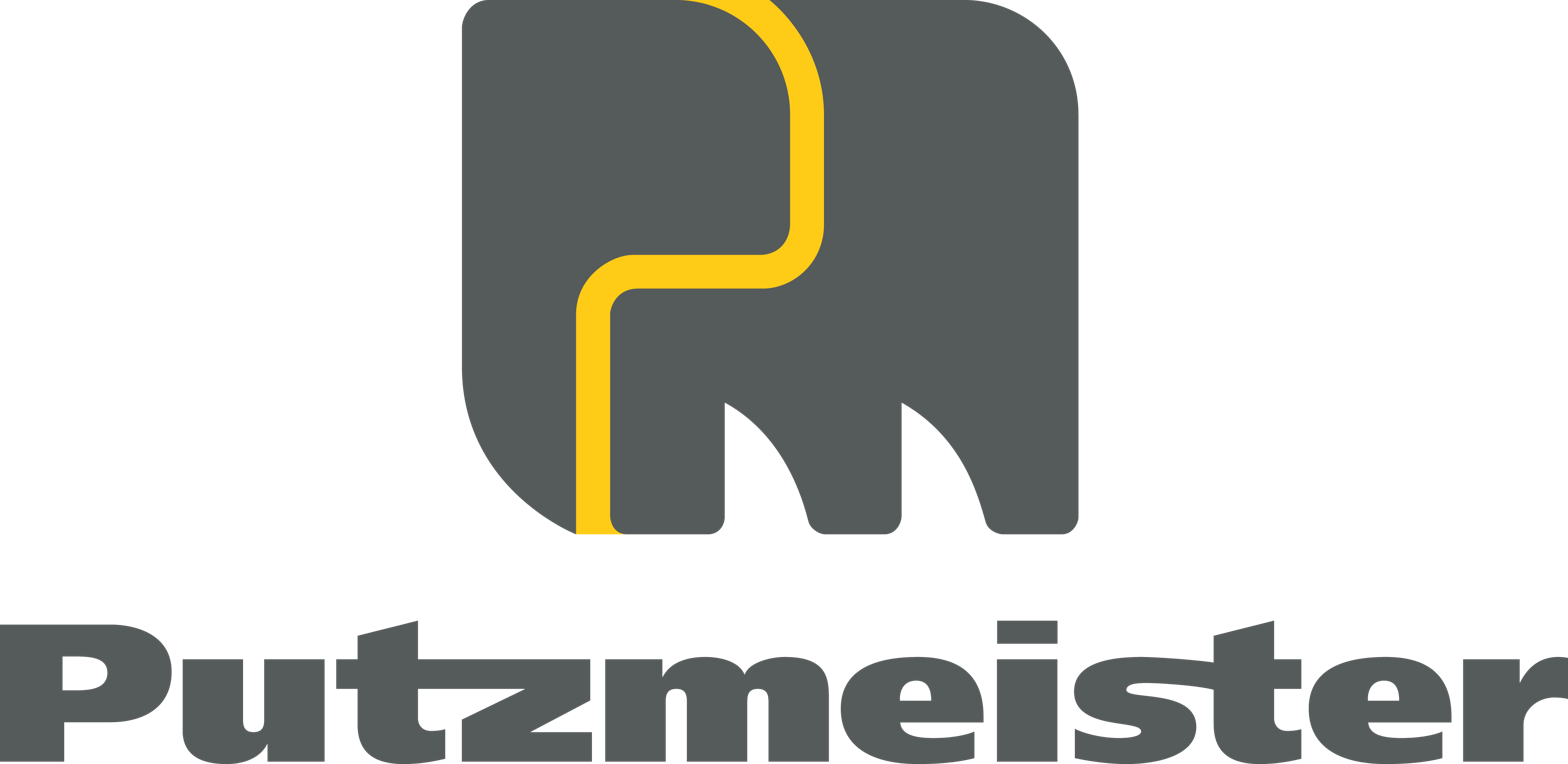
- Company type: Subsidiary
- Industry: Design, manufacture and sales concrete pumps.
- Founded: 1958
- Founder: Karl Schlecht
- Headquarters: Aichtal, Germany
- Key people: Christoph Kaml (CEO)
- Products: Concrete Equipment
- Parent: Sany Heavy Industries
- Website: putzmeister.com

Putzmeister Holding GmbH is a German manufacturer of concrete pumps and other equipment for pumping, distributing and placing concrete, mortar and other high-density solids, and for preparing, temporarily storing, processing and transporting these materials. The firm is headquartered at Aichtal, and is the largest in its field. It also provides pumps for a wide range of different materials, for example slurries, fly ash, sewage, compost and water.

Putzmeister is German for "Plaster Master" (Putz Meister). In 2017, the company had 3,000 employees worldwide.

== History ==
Putzmeister was founded by Karl Schlecht in 1958. Schlecht designed a mortar machine based on his diploma thesis at the University of Stuttgart.

In 1986, Putzmeister 52Z's were used in the Chernobyl nuclear accident, pumping over 300,000 m^{3} (390,000 yd^{3}) of concrete to entomb reactor number 4, setting a world record at the time for volume pumping.

During the 2011 Japanese nuclear accidents at the Fukushima plant, multiple Putzmeister concrete boom pumps were flown to Japan from locations around the world. After the initial success of a M58-5 unit, additional M62-6s and 70Z's were transported to Japan on-board chartered Antonov An-124s, the world's second largest cargo plane. The 70Z is the world's largest boom pump, able to reach over 67 metres (220 ft), and able to be controlled remotely from 2 miles (3.2 km) away. The pumps will be deployed to try to stabilise the four reactors with additional water pumping capacity.

In May 2008, Putzmeister reached a world record in vertical concrete pumping (606 metres (1,988 ft)), via their specially designed concrete pumps type BSA 14000 SHP-D, in building the Burj Khalifa. In 2008, Putzmeister broke its own record by pumping concrete to a height of more than 700 m at the Burj Khalifa.

As the largest German-Sino transaction ever, at the end of January 2012 Putzmeister was sold to the Chinese Sany Heavy Industries, the construction-equipment maker run by China's richest man Liang Wengen.

== Products ==
- Concrete Placing Systems
- Concrete pump
  - Truck-Mounted Concrete Placing Boom Pump
    - Boom Pump Product Range: 20Z-Meter, 28Z-Meter, 31Z-Meter, 32Z-Meter, 36Z-Meter, 38Z-Meter, 38Z-5-Meter, 39Z-Meter, 40Z-Meter, 42Z-Meter, 47Z-Meter, 51Z-5-Meter, 56Z-Meter, 63Z-Meter.
      - "C" Valve (BRF model designation)
      - "S" Valve (BSF model designation)
  - BSA Trailer Pumps: BSA 100 Series, BSA 14000 Series, BSA 21000 Series.
  - Truck-Mounted Line Pumps: City Pump CP 2110 HP, City Pump CP 2112H, City Pump CP 2116H, VS 50 PTO, VS 70 PTO, VSP 70.
  - Thom-Katt Trailer Pumps: TK 7, TK 20, TK 40, TK 50, TK 60, TK 70.
- Mortar Machines
- Shotcrete Machines
- Tunneling and Mining Equipment
- Industrial pumps

== Gallery ==
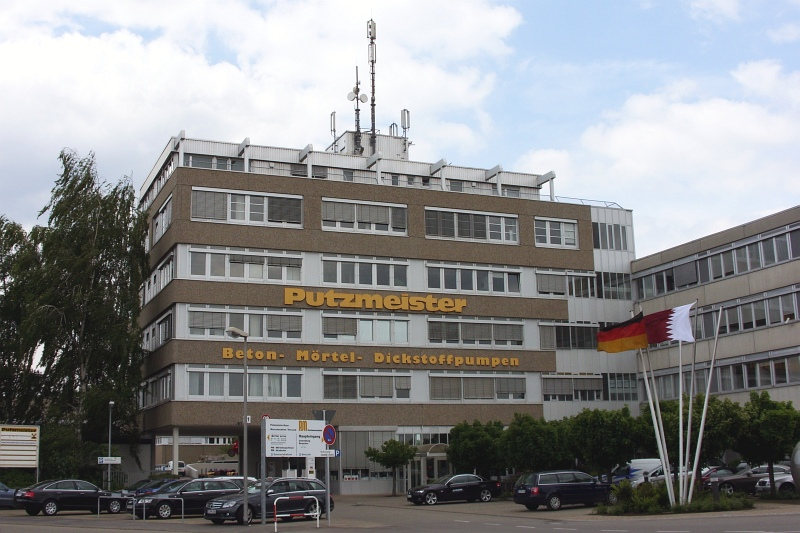
Putzmeister headquarters in Aichtal, Germany

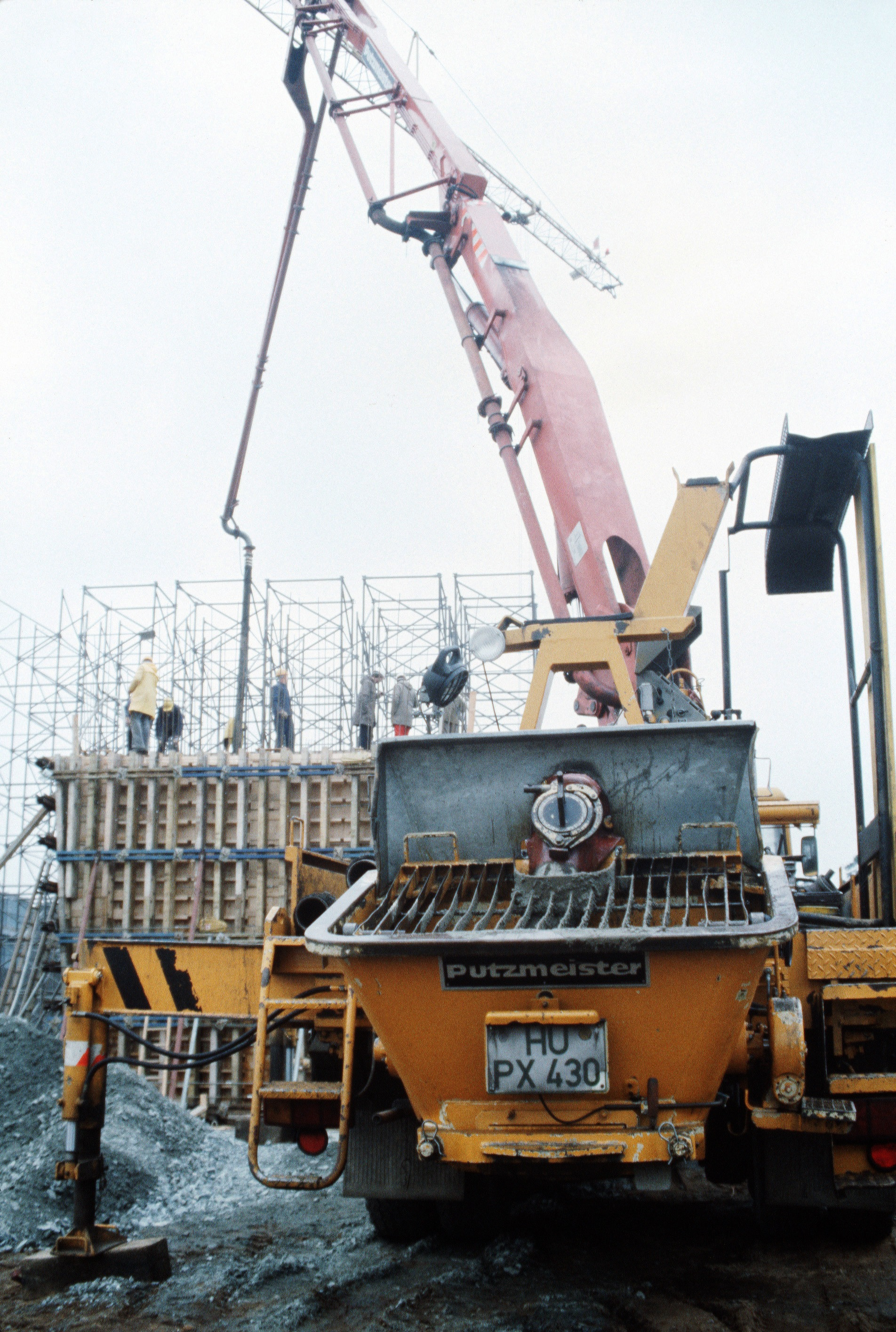
A Putzmeister concrete pump in Germany in 1985

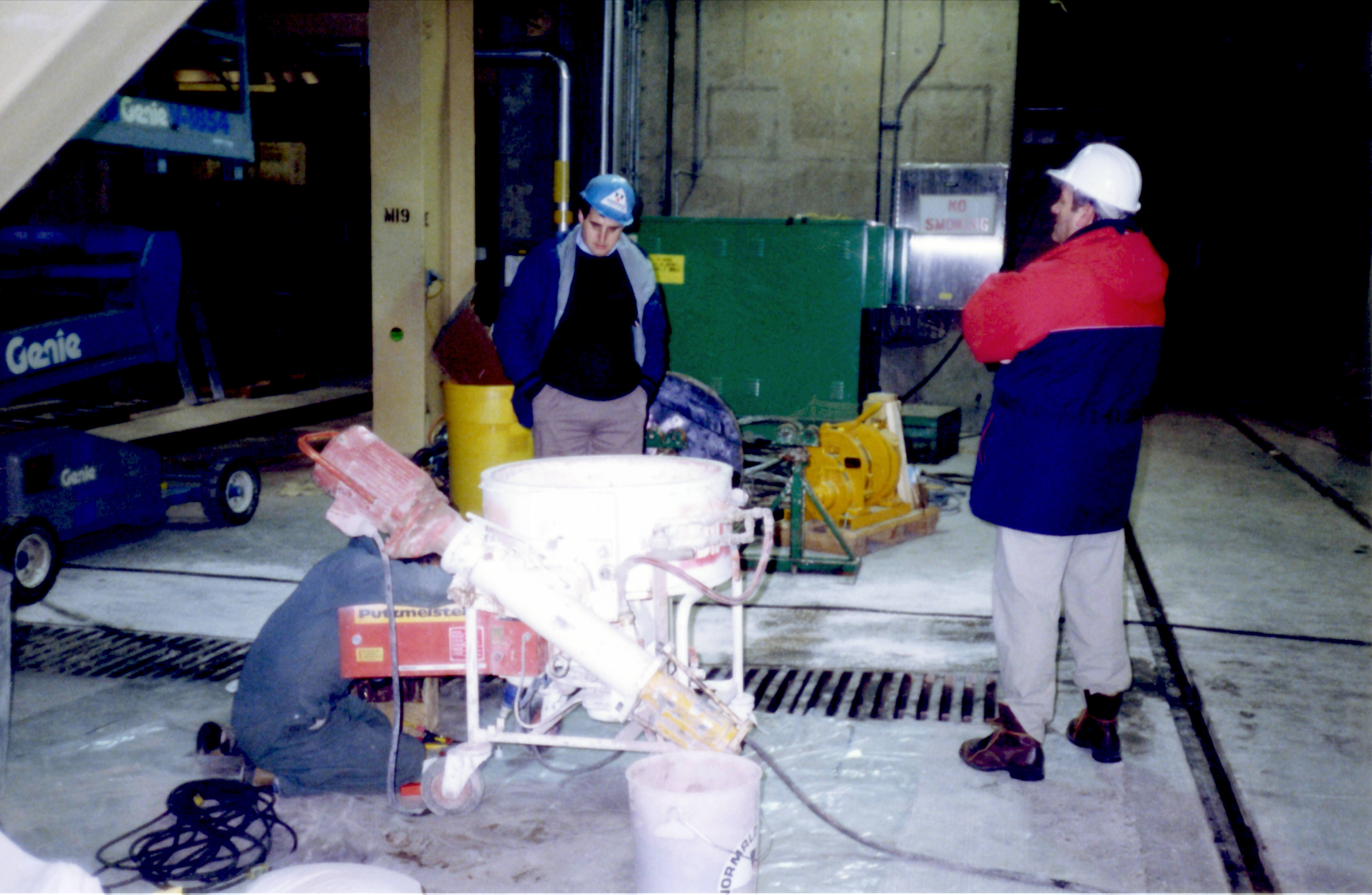
Putzmeister brand positive displacement mortar and plaster pump
