= Tech Safe Systems =

- Company type: Private
- Industry: Manufacturing
- Founded: 1996
- Headquarters: Norfolk, England
- Products: LARS; Winches; Cabins, Containers and Workshops
- Brands: Outreach Ltd; Palfinger Marine
- Services: Aftercare; Refurbishment and Upgrade; Spares and Components
- Owner: Outreach Ltd
- Website: www.techsafe.co.uk

Tech Safe Systems was a Norfolk-based company that are specialists in the design, engineering and manufacturing of launch and recovery systems (LARS), control cabins, workshops for ROVs, and electric and hydraulic winches, most commonly in the deep water industries. It was acquired by Outreach Ltd in 2014.

== History ==
Tech Safe began in 1996 when a gap in the market was identified to provide a complete package of LARS, winches, cabins and workshops, integrated and tested with the customer’s ROV as a complete system. This ensured all the equipment worked together prior to going offshore. Outreach Ltd acquired Tech Safe Systems on 31 July 2014.

== Sectors ==
Tech Safe Systems operated both nationally and, for some of its products, internationally.

- Oil and Gas,
- Offshore Renewables,
- Marine,
- and University and Educational.

== Products ==
Tech Safe Systems operated across the United Kingdom and, for many of its products, across the world and are specialists in the design, engineering and manufacturing of:

- Launch and Recovery Systems (LARS),
- Control Cabins,
- Workshops for ROVs,
- and Electric/Hydraulic Winches.

most commonly in the deep water industries. These products begin life with Autodesk Product Design Suite.

== Projects ==
OWF Project in Wikinger offshore wind farm in the Baltic Sea. Tech Safe developed a Lloyd's Register Certified solution for large diameter drilling (LDD). This included a package of three winches and two control cabins to facilitate the command and control package for their pre-piling template and bubble curtain system.
