= Sany =

Chinese construction machinery manufacturer

Sany Heavy Industry Co., Ltd.
- Type: Public
- Traded as: SSE: 600031; CSI A50; SEHK: 6031
- Industry: Heavy equipment
- Founded: 1989; 37 years ago (Maotang, Lianyuan, Hunan Province)
- Founders: Liang Wengen, Tang Xiuguo, Mao Zhongwu, Yuan Jinhua
- Headquarters: Changsha, Hunan, China
- Area served: Worldwide
- Key people: Emily Herrera Chan, CPA (president); Engr. Jason Eugene Chan, CMA (vice president)
- Operating income: US$16 billion (2021)
- Net income: US$1.82 billion (2021)
- Number of employees: Approximately 90,000
- Subsidiaries: Putzmeister
- Website: www.sany.com.cn/en/(Sany Heavy Industry) www.sanyglobal.com(Sany Group)

Sany
- Chinese: 三一重工股份有限公司
- Literal meaning: Sany Heavy Industry Co., Ltd.
Transcriptions
Standard Mandarin
- Hanyu Pinyin: Sānyī Zhònggōng Gǔfèn Yǒuxiàn Gōngsī

Sany Heavy Industry Co., Ltd. is a Chinese multinational heavy equipment manufacturing company headquartered in Changsha, Hunan. It is the third-largest heavy equipment manufacturer in the world as of 2012, and the first in its industry in China to enter the FT Global 500 and the Forbes Global 2000 rankings. In 2025, Sany ranked 54th on China's 500 Most Influential Brands list and 108th in Asia's 500 Most Influential Brands by World Brand Lab. Its founder and main shareholder is Liang Wengen.

Sany is especially known for its concrete machinery, for which it is globally ranked No.1. It is also a major supplier of excavators, cranes, wheel loaders and other heavy machines.

Sany has a dozen industrial parks in China plus manufacturing facilities in Australia, Belarus, Brazil, Canada, Germany, India, Indonesia, Kazakhstan, Russia, Ukraine and in the United States. The company has approximately 90,000 employees worldwide.

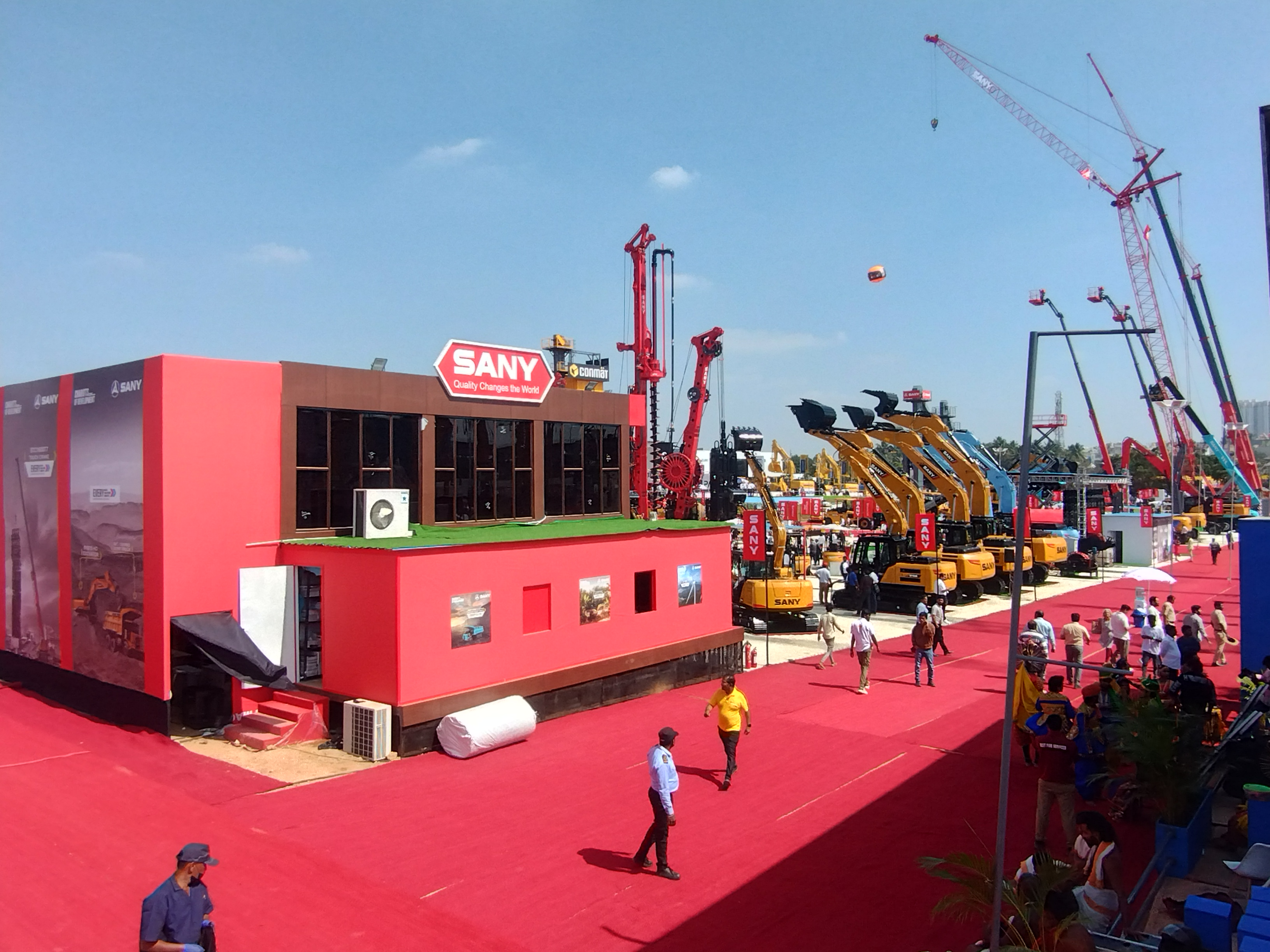
Sany at EXCON 2025, BIEC

== Name, logo and motto ==
The name "Sany" comes from the English pronunciation of the Chinese name of the company (Chinese: 三一; pinyin: Sānyī), which means "three ones", in reference to the three goals the company mentions as its vision: "To build a first-class enterprise, to foster first-class employees, and to make first-class contributions to society". The logo of the company makes reference to this phrase, as it contains three number ones interlinked.

== History ==
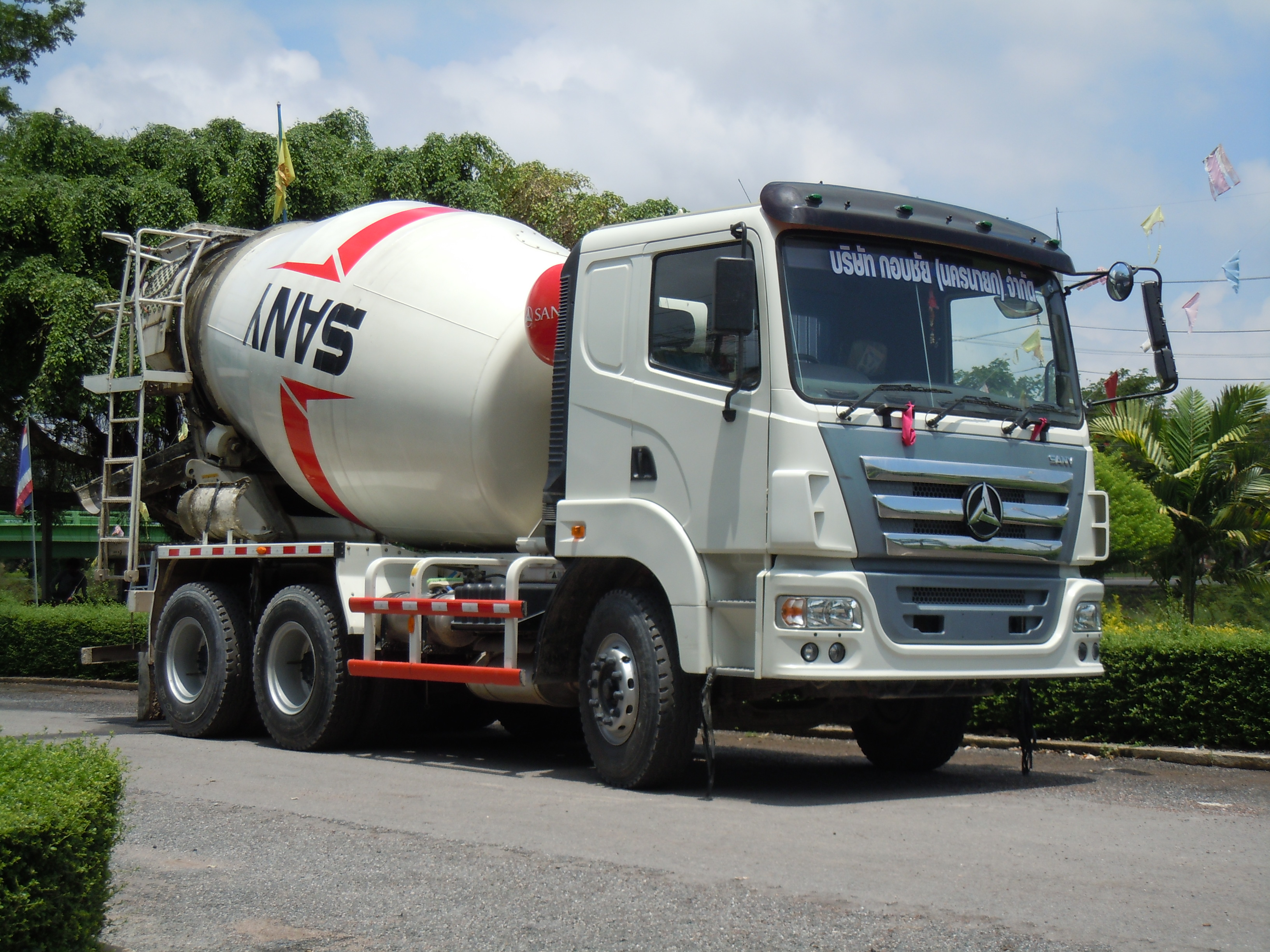
A 2013 SANY SY306C Concrete Mixer Truck

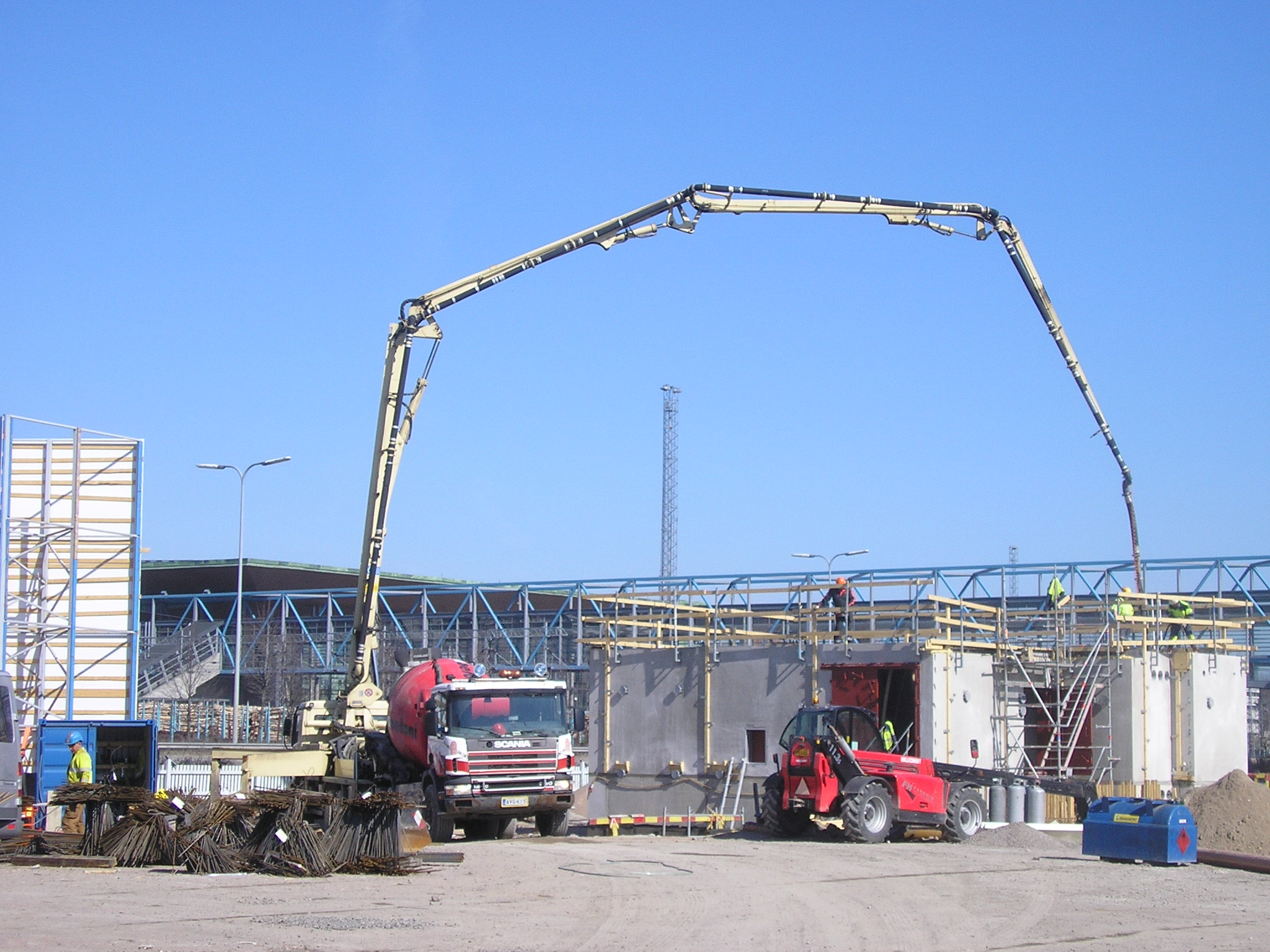
A Putzmeister concrete pump in operation

The origins of Sany lie in Lianyuan Welding Material Ltd, a company founded in 1986 by Liang Wengen, Tang Xiuguo, Mao Zhongwu and Yuan Jinhua, who left their previous jobs and first established the company with a capital of sixty thousand yuans in the town of Maotang, county-level city of Lianyuan.

In 1991 Lianyuan Welding Material Ltd. was officially renamed Sany Group Co., Ltd. and its headquarters were officially moved to Changsha. Since then, the company has experienced continuous rapid growth (at an annualized rate of around 50%), spurred by China's economic boom, specifically growth in its construction sector.

Sany Heavy Industry Co., Ltd was founded in 1994 as a subsidiary of the Sany Group. Sany Heavy Industry went public on the Shanghai Stock Exchange on July 3, 2003. On June 17, 2005, the company conducted the split share structure reform and realized full circulation of its shares. After this event, its market cap started growing at a very fast rate, jumping from a total of RMB 4 million yuan in 2005 up to a total of RMB 137 million yuan in June 2011.

Since its foundation, the headquarters of Sany have received official visits from several political leaders, including Hu Jintao and Wen Jiabao.

In 2010 the operating income of Sany reached just under 34 billion RMB, a 79% year-on-year increase.

During the 2010 Copiapó mining accident, a crane manufactured by SANY was used in rescuing the Chilean miners. A pump from the company was donated to the Tokyo Electric Power Company to assist with the emergency response to the Fukushima I nuclear accidents.

In 2011, Sany signed several contracts to open new manufacturing centers, the most important of them include the Zhuhai and Lingang New City centers, and the fifth international equipment plant in Indonesia, the latter with an investment of US$200 million.

In January 2012 Sany agreed to acquire a 90 per cent stake in Putzmeister, a Germany-based manufacturer of concrete pumps, for €324 million, with CITIC PE Advisors (Hong Kong) Ltd. agreeing to purchase the balance of 10 per cent.

In February 2012, Sany and Austria-based Palfinger announced a market venture to make and sell mobile cranes, a project with a total investment of $143 million, plus the construction of a sales unit in Salzburg for $5.4 million.

In 2012, through affiliate Ralls Corp., Sany acquired four wind farm projects in Oregon. Later in the year, though, the Obama administration ordered the wind farms divested after it was determined their location next to the Naval Weapons Systems Training Facility in Boardman, Oregon represented a national security risk. The divestiture—the first of its kind since 1990—was ordered by the US Treasury Department, which chairs the interagency Committee on Foreign Investment.

In 2014, Sany's Huerfano River Wind Farm was acquired by Tamra-Tacoma Capital Partners. Tamra-Tacoma Capital Partners and Sany soon after announced plans to construct 1 gigawatt of wind infrastructure in the United States. The Huerafano acquisition marked Sany's first partnership with a U.S. mainland investment firm. Tamra-Tacoma Capital Partners initiated litigation against Sany America on August 31, 2016, alleging Sany fraudulently misrepresented the plant's production and had no maintenance program, leaving the asset "worthless" according to the complaint. On February 6, 2019, the case was settled and subsequently dismissed with prejudice.

In March 2017, Sany and Star Energy announced plans to construct 1 gigawatt of wind infrastructure in the United States.

In 2021, the company was ranked 468th in the Forbes Global 2000, first among heavy equipment manufacturers in China and second in the world.

In 2023, Liang Wengen retired as the chairman of the Sany Group at the age of 67.

== Operations ==
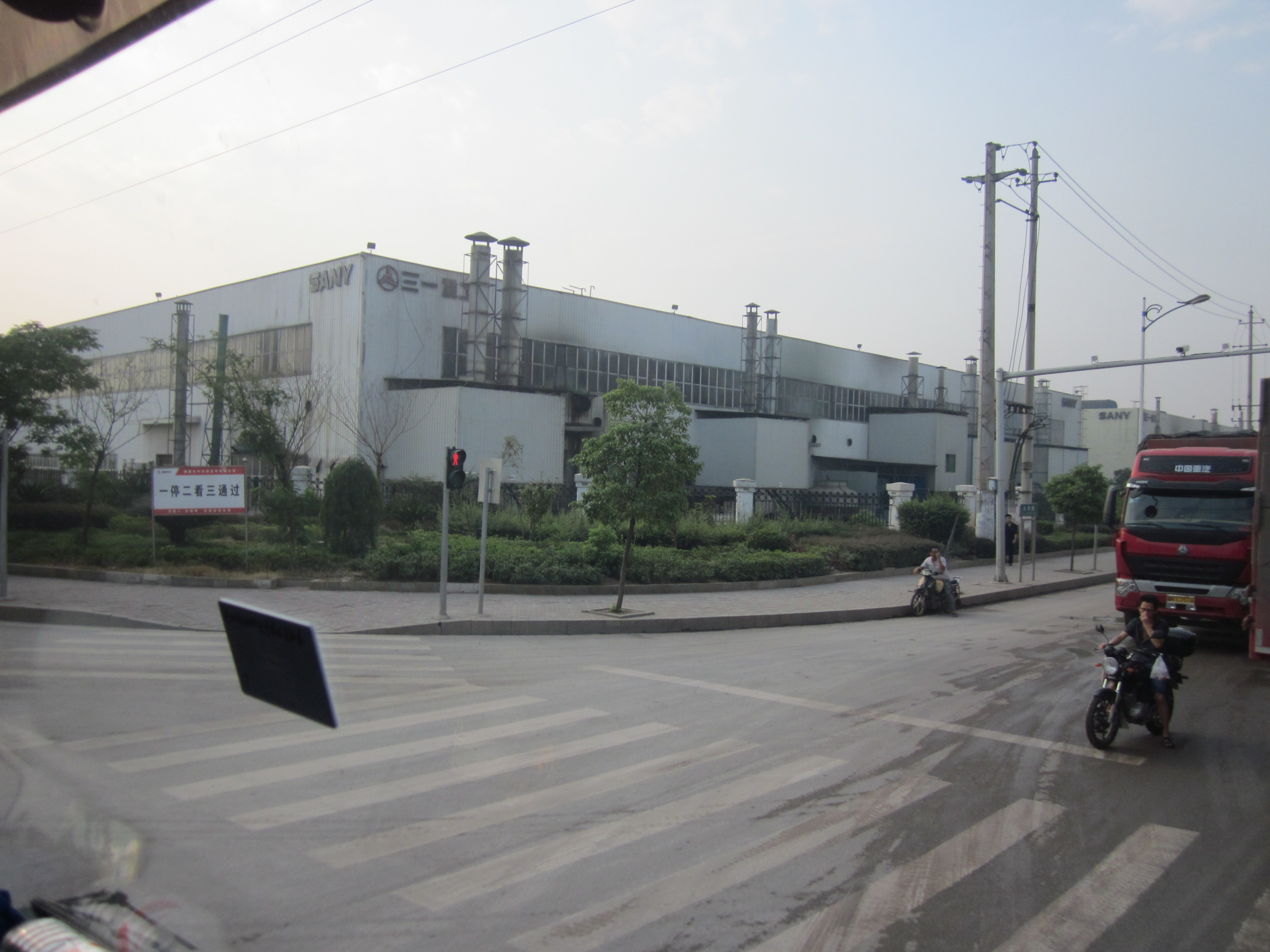
The Sany factory in Loudi, Hunan province

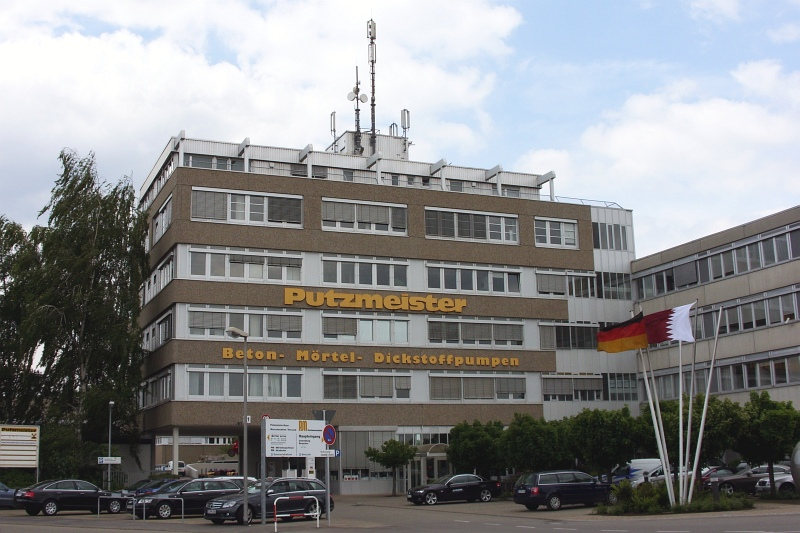
The headquarters of Sany subsidiary Putzmeister, in Aichtal, Germany

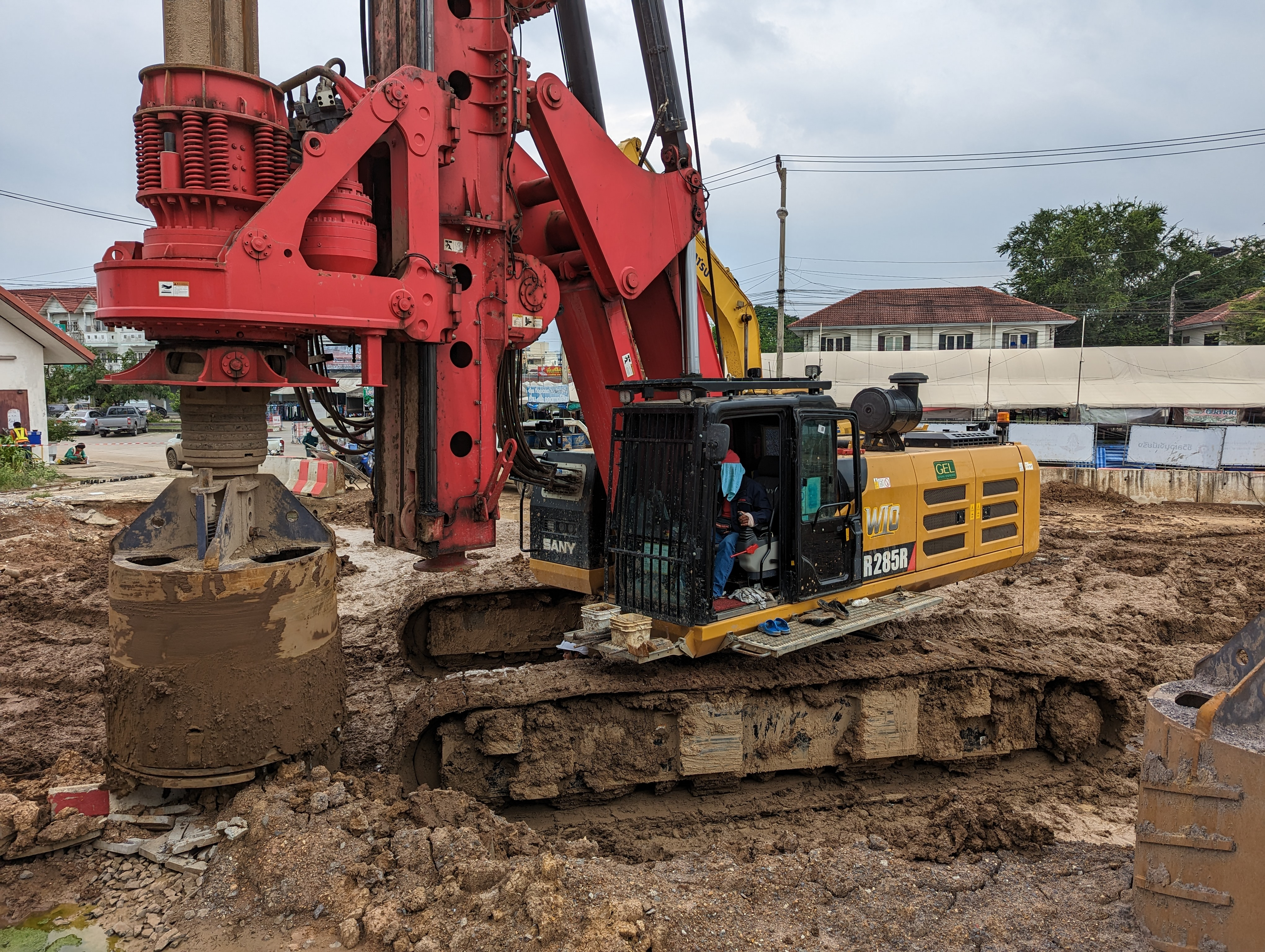
SANY R285R rotary drilling rig in Thailand

Sany Group is organised into the following major divisions and subsidiaries:

- Concrete pump division, based in Changsha, includes the truck-mounted concrete pumps, stationary concrete pumps, concrete mixers, concrete plants, etc.
- Road construction division, also based in Changsha, with the paver, roller and grader as their main products.
- Port machinery division, originally based in Changsha but moving to the new facilities in Zhuhai, providing reachstackers, empty container handlers, ship-to-shore cranes, rail-mounted gantry cranes, rubber tyred gantry cranes, etc.
- Mobile crane division, based in Ningxiang City, Hunan, in charge of truck-mounted cranes, rough terrain cranes and all-terrain cranes.
- Sany Electric Co., Ltd. in Beijing, more specifically in Changping District, is in charge of wind power machinery products.
- Sany Heavy Machinery (Beijing) Co., Ltd. also located in Changping District manufactures pile drivers.
- Sany Heavy Machinery (Kunshan) Co., Ltd., in the city of Kunshan is the unit in charge of excavators.
- Sany Heavy Equipment Co., Ltd., located in Shenyang, and producing coal mining machinery.
- Sany Science and Technology Co., Ltd., based in Shanghai, and producing crawler cranes.
- Sany Renewable Energy Co., Ltd. based in Beijing manufacturers wind turbines for renewable energy solutions.
- Bank of Sanxiang based in Changsha is private owned bank by Sany Group operating in China which focuses on industrial financing.
- Shanghai Zhu Sheng Yuan Property Co., Ltd. based in Changsha is a real easte and construction company.
- Sany Polytechnic College based in Changsha is an educational institute providing education for science and marketing.

== NASCAR sponsorship ==
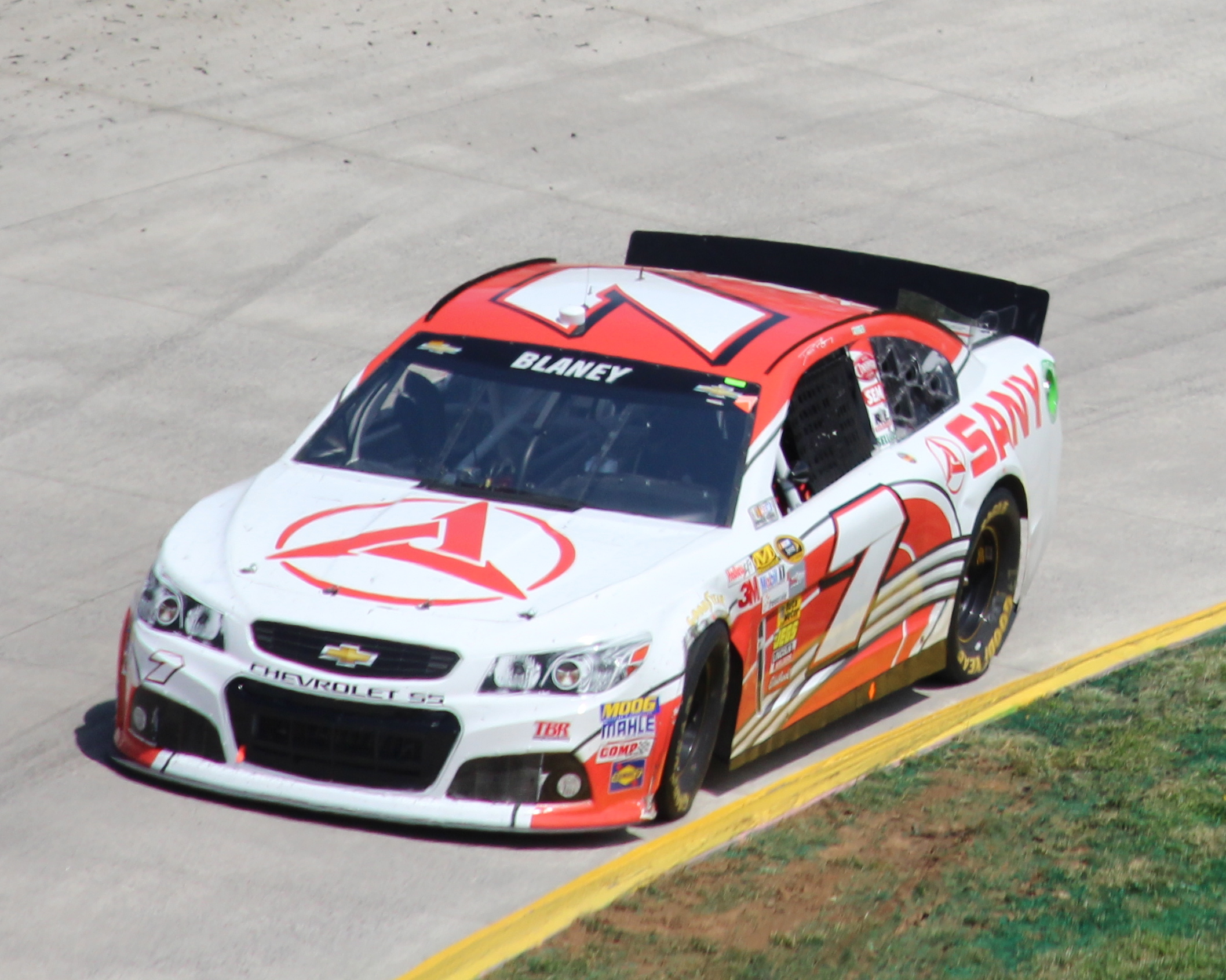
The #7 SANY-sponsored Chevrolet at Martinsville Speedway in 2013

Sany sponsored the Tommy Baldwin Racing #7 driven by Dave Blaney in the NASCAR Sprint Cup Series in 14 races in 2013, while also serving as associate sponsor for 22 races.

In 2020 Sany and Ironpeddlers, a North Carolina based heavy equipment dealer co-signed Colby Howard and Car no. 15 of JD Motorsports for the 2020 NASCAR Xfinity Series.

== Achievement ==
In 2023 Sany made a Guinness World Record for The longest journey by an electric semi-trailer truck in a single charge. The run was performed using a Sany Mota 1165, an electric semi-trailer on a journey from Changsha to Don Guan covering a total of 817.5km the total weight of the tractor trailer combination was 40 tons.

== See also ==
- XCMG
- Zoomlion
- LiuGong
- Weichai Group
- Palfinger
- Putzmeister
- Shantui
