= Antonov An-124 Ruslan =

Soviet military transport aircraft

An-124 Ruslan
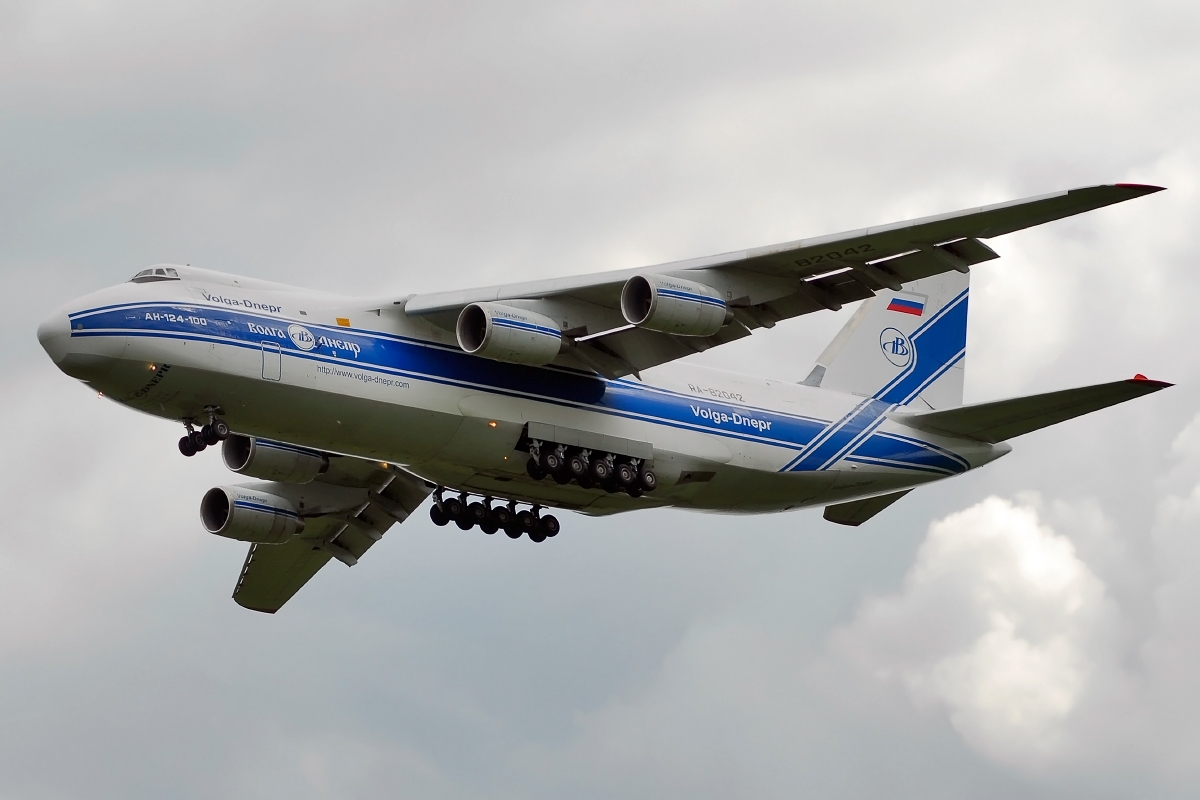
- A Volga-Dnepr Airlines An-124 landing at Moscow Domodedovo Airport

General information
- Type: Heavy transport aircraft
- National origin: Soviet Union
- Manufacturer: Antonov
- Designer: Antonov
- Built by: Antonov Serial Production Plant; Aviastar-SP
- Status: In service
- Primary users: Russian Aerospace Forces Volga-Dnepr Airlines; Antonov Airlines; Maximus Air
- Number built: 57

History
- Manufactured: 1982–2004
- Introduction date: 1986
- First flight: 24 December 1982
- Developed into: Antonov An-225 Mriya

The Antonov An-124 Ruslan (Russian: Антонов Ан-124 Руслан; Ukrainian: Ан-124 Руслан; NATO reporting name: Condor) is a large, strategic airlift, four-engined aircraft that was designed in the 1980s by the Antonov Design Bureau in the Ukrainian SSR of the Soviet Union (USSR). The An-124 is the world's second heaviest gross weight production cargo airplane and heaviest operating cargo aircraft, behind the destroyed one-off Antonov An-225 Mriya (an enlarged derivative of the An-124). The An-124 remains the largest military transport aircraft in service.

In 1971, design work commenced on the project, which was initially referred to as Izdeliye 400 (Product #400), at the Antonov Design Bureau in response to a shortage in heavy airlift capability within the Military Transport Aviation Command (Komandovaniye voyenno-transportnoy aviatsii or VTA) arm of the Soviet Air Forces. Two separate final assembly lines plants setup for the aircraft, one at Aviastar-SP (ex. Ulyanovsk Aviation Industrial Complex) in Ulyanovsk, Russia and the other was the Kyiv Aviation Plant AVIANT, in Ukraine. Assembly of the first aircraft begun in 1979; the An-124 (which was sometimes referred to as the An-40 in the West) performed its maiden flight on 24 December 1982. The type made its first appearance in the Western world at the 1985 Paris Air Show. Viktor Tolmachev was the chief engineer of An-124 and An-225. After the dissolution of the Soviet Union, commercial operations were quickly pursued for the An-124, leading to civil certification being obtained by Antonov on 30 December 1992. Various commercial operators opted to purchase the type, often acquiring refurbished ex-military airlifters or stored fuselages rather than new-build aircraft.

By July 2013, 26 An-124s were reportedly in commercial service while a further ten airlifters were on order. During 2008, it was announced that Russia and Ukraine were to jointly resume production of the type. At one point, it looked as if Russia would order 20 new-build airlifters. However, in August 2014, it was reported that the planned resumption of manufacturing had been shelved due to the political tensions between Russia and Ukraine. In 2019, there were 26 An-124s in commercial service.

== Development ==
=== Background ===
During the 1970s, the Military Transport Aviation Command (Komandovaniye voyenno-transportnoy aviatsii or VTA) arm of the Soviet Air Forces had a shortfall in strategic heavy airlift capacity. Its largest aircraft consisted of about 50 Antonov An-22 turboprops, which were used heavily for tactical roles. A declassified 1975 CIA analysis concluded that the USSR did "...not match the US in ability to provide long-range heavy lift support." Soviet officials sought not only additional airlifters, a substantial increase in payload capacity was also desirable so that the same task could be completed with fewer trips.

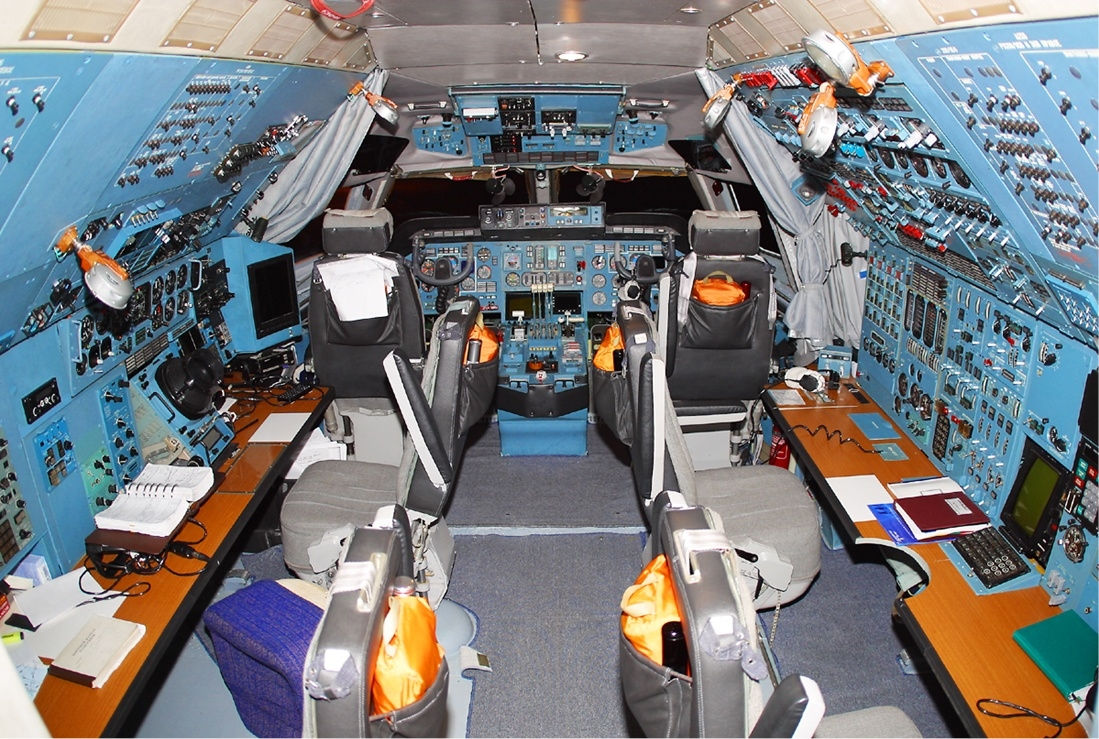
Polet Flight An-124 cockpit

In 1971, design work on the project commenced at the Antonov Design Bureau; the lead designer of the An-124 (and the enlarged An-225 derivative) was Viktor Tolmachev. During development, it was known as Izdeliye 400 (Product #400) in house, and An-40 in the West. The design produced broadly resembled the Lockheed C-5 Galaxy, an American strategic airlifter, but also incorporated numerous improvements, the greater use of carbon-fibre composites in its construction (comprising around 5% of the aircraft's total weight) and the more extensive use of titanium being amongst these benefits. Aluminium alloys make up the primary material used in its construction, limited use of steel and titanium alloys were also made. The An-124 has a fully-pressurized upper 88-passenger deck, but unlike the C-5, the main cargo deck is only partially-pressurized. The An-124 doesn't have any inflight refuelling capability.

In 1973, the construction of the necessary facilities to produce the new airlifter began. Two separate final assembly lines plants were established to produce the airlifter: the company Aviastar-SP (ex. Ulyanovsk Aviation Industrial Complex) in Ulyanovsk, Russia and by the Kyiv Aviation Plant AVIANT, in Ukraine. Furthermore, the programme used components, systems, and various other elements drawn from in excess of 100 factories across the Eastern world. In 1979, manufacturing activity on the first airframe began.

On 24 December 1982, the type performed its maiden flight. Three years later, the An-124 made its first appearance in the Western world when an example was displayed at the 1985 Paris Air Show. Following the fall of the Soviet Union, commercial operations of the An-124 became an increasingly important area of activity; to this end, civil certification was sought for the type by Antonov; this was issued on 30 December 1992.

=== Post-Soviet developments ===
Sales of the An-124 to various commercial operators proceeded throughout the 1990s and into the mid 2000s; many of these were former military aircraft that were refurbished by Antonov prior to delivery, or unfinished fuselages that had been preserved, rather than producing new-build aircraft. During the early 2000s, the cargo operator Volga-Dnepr opted to upgrade its An-124 freighter fleet, these works included engine modifications to conform with chapter four noise regulations, various structural improvements that increased service life, and numerous avionics and systems changes to facilitate four person operations, reducing the crew needed from six or seven.

During April 2008, it was announced that Russia and Ukraine had agreed to resume the production of the An-124 in the third quarter of 2008. One month later, a new variant — the An-124-150 — was announced; it featured several improvements, including a maximum lift capacity of 150 tonnes. However, in May 2009, Antonov's partner, the Russian United Aircraft Corporation announced it did not plan to produce any An-124s in the period 2009–2012. During late 2009, Russian President Dmitry Medvedev ordered production of the aircraft resumed; at this point, Russia was expected to procure 20 new-build An-124s. In August 2014, Janes Information Services reported that Russian Deputy Minister of Industry and Trade Yuri Slusar announced that production of the An-124 had been stopped as a consequence of the ongoing political tensions between Russia and Ukraine.

In late 2017, multiple An-124s were upgraded by the Aviastar-SP plant in Ulyanovsk, Russia, three of which were reportedly scheduled to return to flight during the following year. As Russia–Ukraine relations continued to sour, Antonov begun to source new suppliers while also pushing to Westernize the An-124. During 2018, the American engine manufacturer GE Aviation was studying reengining it with CF6s for CargoLogicAir, a Volga-Dnepr subsidiary. It was believed that this would likely provide a range increase; as Volga-Dnepr Group operated 12 aircraft, the change would imply purchasing between 50 and 60 engines with spares. The Russian engine specialist Aviadvigatel also indicated that a further development of its PD-14, which was intended for use on an upgraded model of the Russian-manufactured An-124, designated PD-35, generated 50% more power than the present Ukrainian Progress D-18T engines.

During January 2019, Antonov revealed its plans to restart production of the An-124 without support from Russia.

=== Russian replacement design ===
At the MAKS Air Show in 2017, the Central Aerohydrodynamic Institute (TsAGI) announced its An-124-102 Slon (Elephant) design to replace the similar An-124-100. The design was detailed in January 2019 before wind tunnel testing scheduled for August–September. It is intended to be produced at the Aviastar-SP factory in Ulyanovsk. It should transport 150 t (330,000 lb) over 3,800 nmi (7,000 km) (up from 1,675 nmi, 3,102 km), or 180 t (400,000 lb) over 2,650 nmi (4,910 km) at 460 kn (850 km/h). The Russian MoD wants a range of 4,100 nmi (7,600 km) with five Sprut-SDM-1 light tanks and their 100 crew, or 300 armed soldiers.

The planned An-124-102 is larger at 82.3 m (270 ft) long from 69 m (227 ft), with an 87–88 m (286–290 ft) span versus 73.3 m (240.5 ft) and 24.0 m (78.7 ft) high compared with 21.0 m (68.9 ft). A new higher aspect ratio, composite wing and a 214–222 t (472,000–489,000 lb) airframe would allow a 490–500 t (1,080,000–1,100,000 lb) gross weight. It should be powered by Russian PD-35s developed for the CR929 widebody, producing 35 tf (77,000 lbf) up from 23 tf (51,000 lbf). Two fuselages are planned, one for Volga-Dnepr with a width of 5.3 m (17.4 ft) from the An-124's 4.4 m (14.4 ft), and one for the Russian MoD of 6.4 m (21 ft) wide to carry vehicles in two lines.

On 5 November 2019, the TsAGI released pictures of a 1.63 m (5 ft 4 in) long and 1.75 m (5 ft 9 in) wide model, ahead of windtunnel testing. On 26 March 2020, TsAGI released new pictures of a wind tunnel model, announcing that the researchers of the Institute had completed the first cycle of aerodynamic testing; the results confirmed the characteristics laid down during preliminary studies.

== Design ==
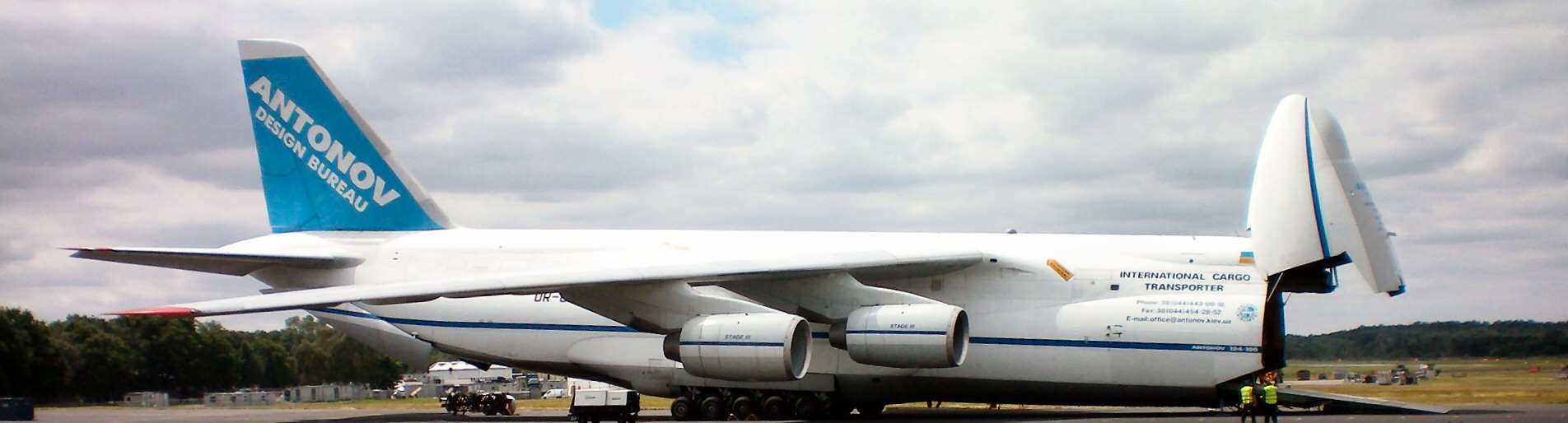
An-124-100 kneeling with front ramp down (nose undercarriage retracted)

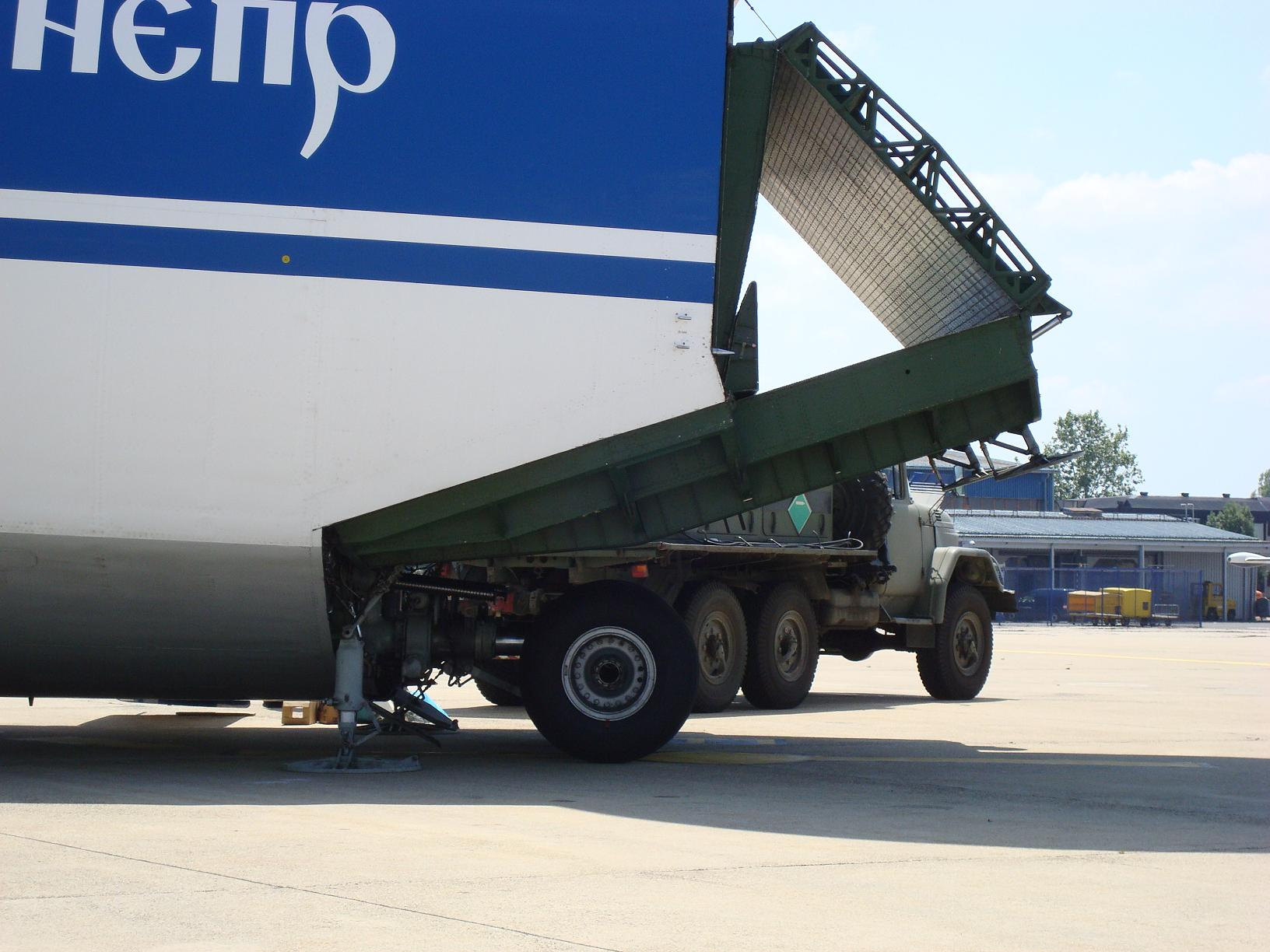
Kneeling detail

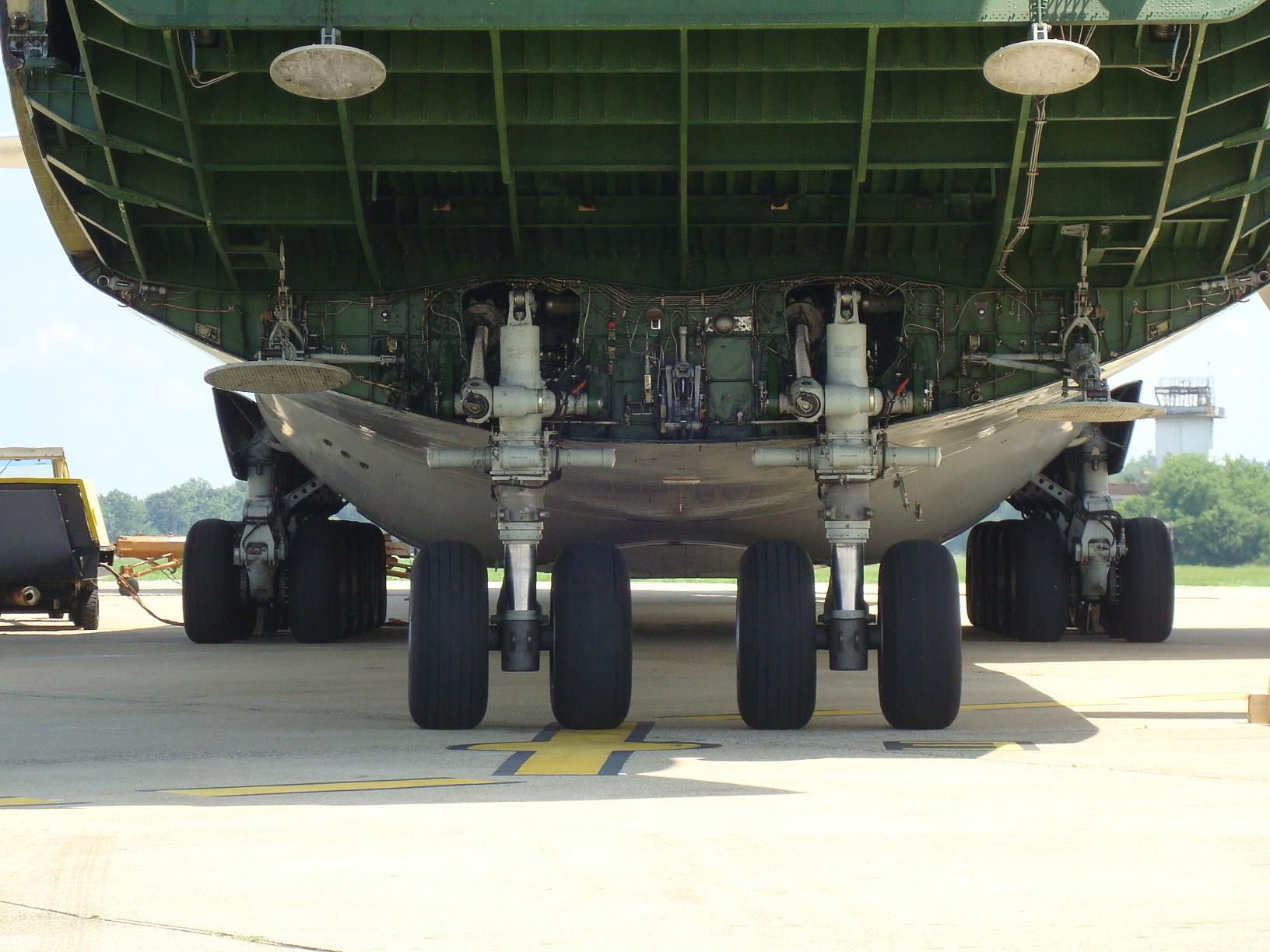
Not kneeling – nose gear extended

The Antonov An-124 Ruslan is a large, strategic airlift, four-engined aircraft. An aircraft with a similar role, it externally bears numerous similarities to the American Lockheed C-5 Galaxy, having a double fuselage to allow for a rear cargo door (on the lower fuselage) that can open in flight without affecting structural integrity, as well as the arrangement of flight control surfaces, such as the slats, flaps, and spoilers, resembling the layout of the C-5. The An-124 has a slightly shorter fuselage, has a slightly greater wingspan, and is capable of carrying a 17 percent larger payload. In place of the C-5's T-tail, the An-124 is furnished with a conventional empennage, similar in design to that of the Boeing 747. The An-124 features a fly-by-wire control system. This is a hybrid control system, as it also implements conventional mechanical controls for some aspects; these have been arranged in a manner that provides redundancy against the failure of a single hydraulic circuit.

A single An-124 is capable of carrying up to 150 tonnes (150 long tons; 170 short tons) of cargo internally in a standard military configuration; it can also carry 88 passengers in an upper deck behind the wing centre section. The forward area of this upper deck is where the flight deck and the crew are accommodated; movement between the upper and lower decks is via a pair of foldable internal ladders. The cargo compartment of the An-124 is 36×6.4×4.4 m (118×21×14 ft), ca. 20% larger than the main cargo compartment of the C-5 Galaxy, which is 36.91×5.79×4.09 m (121.1×19.0×13.4 ft). Largely due to the limited pressurisation of its main cargo compartment (24.6 kPa, 3.57 psi), the airlifter has seldom been used to deploy paratroopers or to carry passengers, as they would typically require oxygen masks and cold-weather clothing in such conditions. In comparison, the upper deck is fully pressurised. The floor of the cargo deck is entirely composed of titanium, a measure that is usually prohibited by the material cost. It is suitable for carrying almost any heavy vehicle, including multiple main battle tanks.

The An-124 is powered by four Lotarev D-18 turbofan engines, each capable of generating up to 238–250 kN of thrust. To reduce the landing distance required, thrust reversers are present. Pilots have stated that the airlifter is relatively light on the controls and is easy to handle for an aircraft of its size. A pair of TA18-200-124 auxiliary power units (APUs) are accommodated within the main landing gear fairings. As a consequence of the heat and blast effects produced by these APUs, some airports require pavement protection to be deployed. The landing gear of the An-124 is outfitted with an oleo strut suspension system for its 24 wheels. This suspension has been calibrated to allow for landing on rough terrain and is able to kneel, which allows for easier loading and unloading via the front cargo door. Other features intended to ease loading including an onboard overhead crane in the cargo deck, capable of lifting up to 30 tonnes, while items up to 120 tonnes can be winched onboard. Two separate radar units are typically present, one is intended for ground mapping and navigation purposes, while the other is for weather.

== Operational history ==
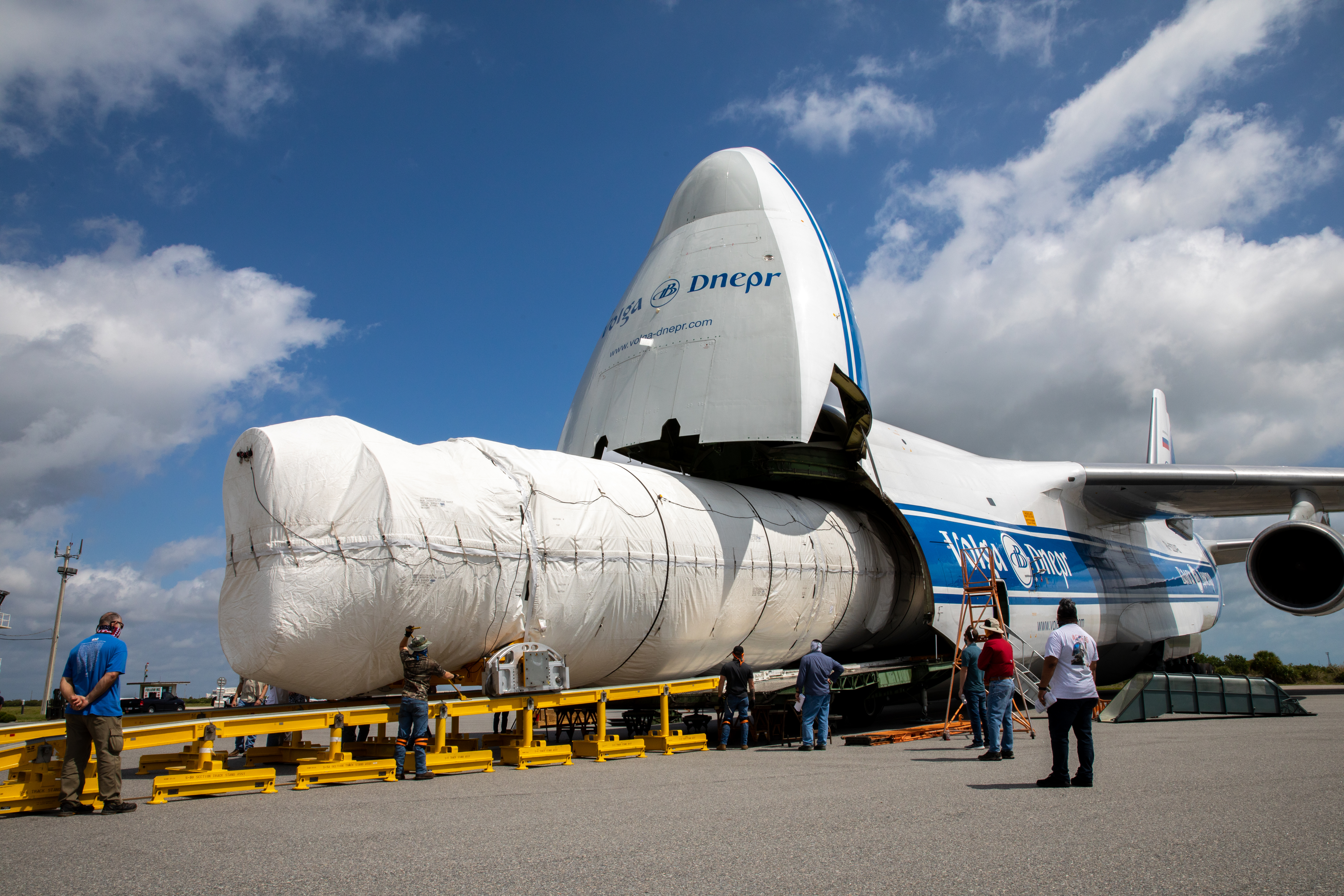
An-124 during unloading of an Atlas V rocket main stage

During the 2000s, Germany headed an initiative to lease An-124s for NATO strategic airlift requirements. Two aircraft were leased from SALIS GmbH as a stopgap until the Airbus A400M became available. Under the NATO SALIS programme NAMSA is chartering six An-124-100 transport aircraft. According to the contract An-124-100s of Antonov Airlines and Volga-Dnepr are used within the limits of the NATO SALIS programme to transport cargo by the requests of 18 countries: Belgium, Hungary, Greece, Denmark, Canada, Luxembourg, Netherlands, Norway, United Kingdom, Poland, Portugal, Slovakia, Slovenia, Finland, France, Germany, Czech Republic and Sweden. Two An-124-100s are constantly based on full-time charter in the Leipzig/Halle Airport, but the contract specifies that if necessary, two more aircraft will be provided at six days' notice and another two at nine days' notice. The aircraft proved extremely useful for NATO especially with operations in Iraq and Afghanistan.

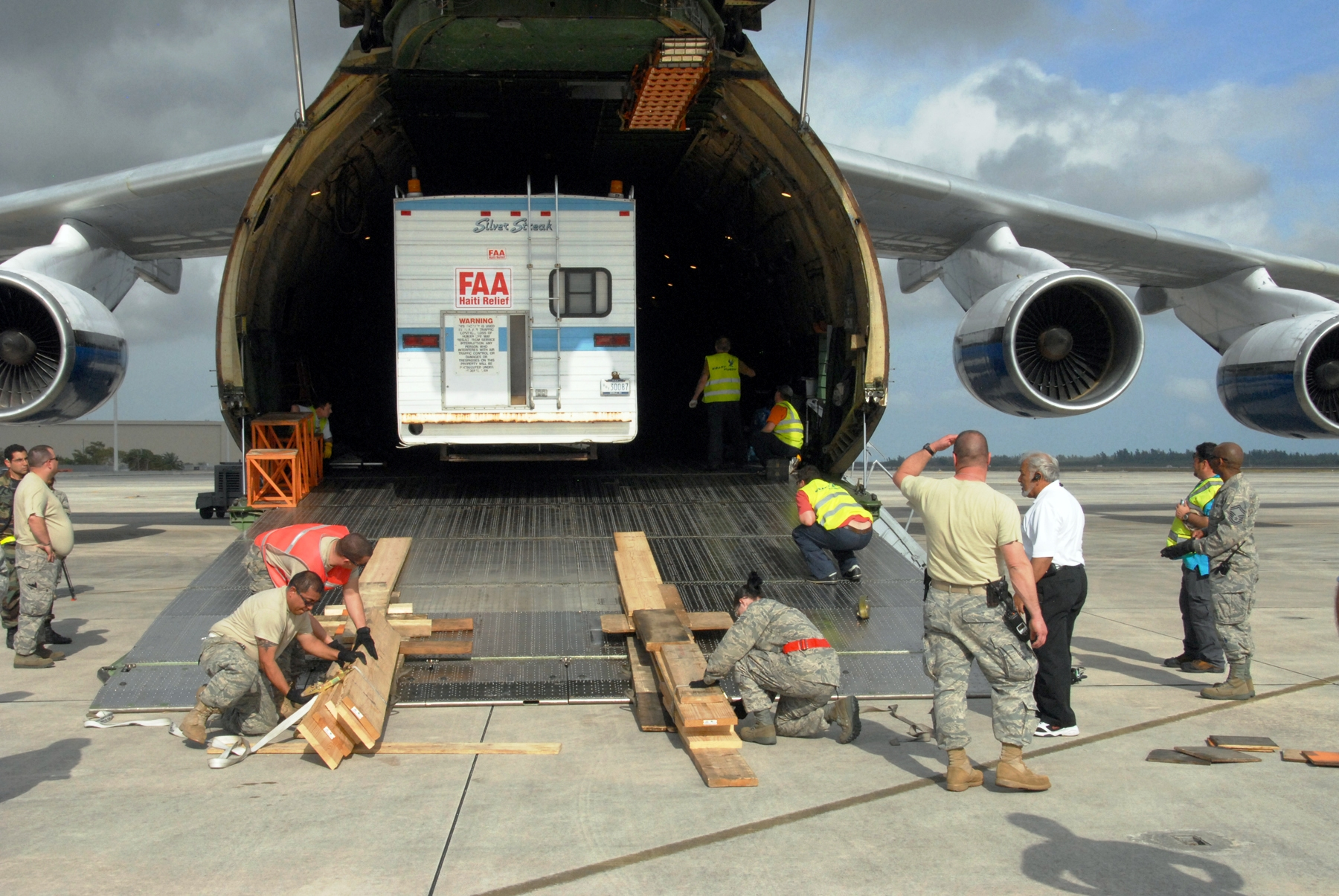
Mobile air traffic control tower loaded onto an An-124 to Haiti

United Launch Alliance (ULA) contracts the An-124 to transport the Atlas V launch vehicle from its facilities in Decatur, Alabama to Cape Canaveral. ULA also uses the An-124 to transport the Atlas V launch vehicle and Centaur upper stage from their manufacturing facility in Denver, Colorado to Cape Canaveral and Vandenberg Space Force Base. Two flights are required to transfer each launch vehicle (one for the Atlas V main booster stage and another for the Centaur upper stage). It is also contracted by Space Systems Loral to transport satellites from Palo Alto, CA to the Arianespace spaceport in Kourou, French Guiana and by SpaceX to transport payload fairings between their factory in Hawthorne, California and Cape Canaveral.

By 2013, the An-124 had reportedly visited 768 airports in over 100 countries.

By late 2020, three civil operators of the An-124 remained. Antonov Airlines with seven aircraft, Volga-Dnepr Airlines with 12, and Maximus Air Cargo with one. In November 2020, Volga-Dnepr reported that it was indefinitely grounding its fleet of An-124 aircraft to inspect the 60 engines (including spares) following the 13 November 2020 unconfined engine failure at Novosibirsk. As of 29 December 2020, the first Volga-Dnepr An-124-100 was back in service.

=== Significant activities ===
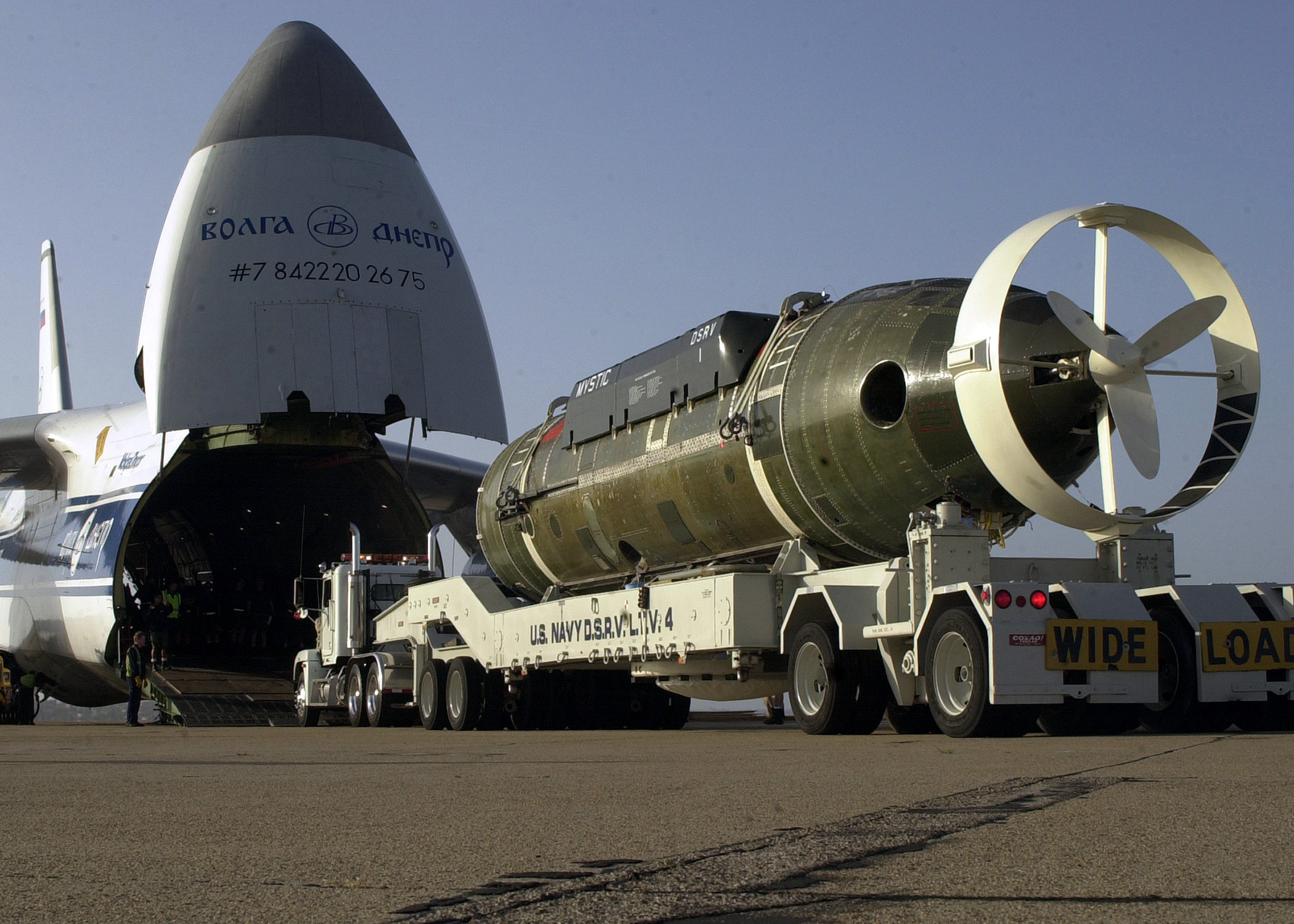
The Deep Submergence Rescue Vehicle "Mystic" being loaded at Naval Air Station North Island, California, United States

- In May 1987, an An-124 set a world record, covering the distance of 20,151 km (10,881 nmi) without refuelling. The flight took 25 hours and 30 minutes; the takeoff weight was 455,000 kg.
- In July 1985, an An-124 carried 171,219 kg (377,473 lb) of cargo to an altitude of 2,000 m (6,600 ft) and 170,000 kg to an altitude of 10,750 m (35,270 ft).
- In June 1994, an An-124 flew the first IE 201 Class diesel-electric locomotive from the General Motors Diesel works in London, Ontario, Canada to Dublin, Ireland for clearance testing and crew training, before subsequent units were delivered by ship.
- An An-124 was used to transport the Obelisk of Axum back to its native homeland of Ethiopia from Rome in April 2005.
- An An-124 was used to transport the first Bombardier Movia-series railcar for the Delhi Metro on 26 February 2009.
- In July 2010, an An-124 was used to transport four 35-foot and three 21-foot skimmer boats from France to the US to assist with the clean-up of the Deepwater Horizon oil spill.
- An An-124 was used in April 2011 to airlift a large Putzmeister concrete pump from Germany to Japan to help cool reactors damaged in the Fukushima nuclear accident. The An-225 was used to transport an even larger Putzmeister concrete pump to Japan from the US.
- An An-124 was used in May 2018 to transport an 87,000 lb die tool from Eaton Rapids, Michigan, US to Nottingham, England to restart Ford F-150 production after a fire in the Eaton Rapids Magnesium Casting Facility.
- Several An-124s were used by the German Bundeswehr to airlift military equipment from Mazar-i-Sharif to Leipzig during the 2021 German troop withdrawal from Afghanistan. Among the equipment were two NH-90 helicopters.
- During the COVID-19 pandemic, several An-124s were used to cargo masks and other medical equipment from China to foreign countries. For example, Terio International Inc. dispatched their first one on June 7, 2020 between Nanjing and Montréal, which was done as a direct flight.
- On 24 February 2022, an An-124 with registration number UR-82009 was confirmed to be destroyed by Russian artillery during the Battle of Antonov Airport, Kyiv. Five other Ukrainian An-124s were diverted to Leipzig at the conclusion of their commercial flights.
- On 3 March 2023, an An-124 delivered 101 tons of humanitarian aid for earthquake victims in Turkey and Syria.
- On 9 June 2023, an An-124 was seized by Canadian government authorities at Toronto Pearson Airport. It had been stranded following closure of Canadian airspace to Russian air navigation.

== Variants ==
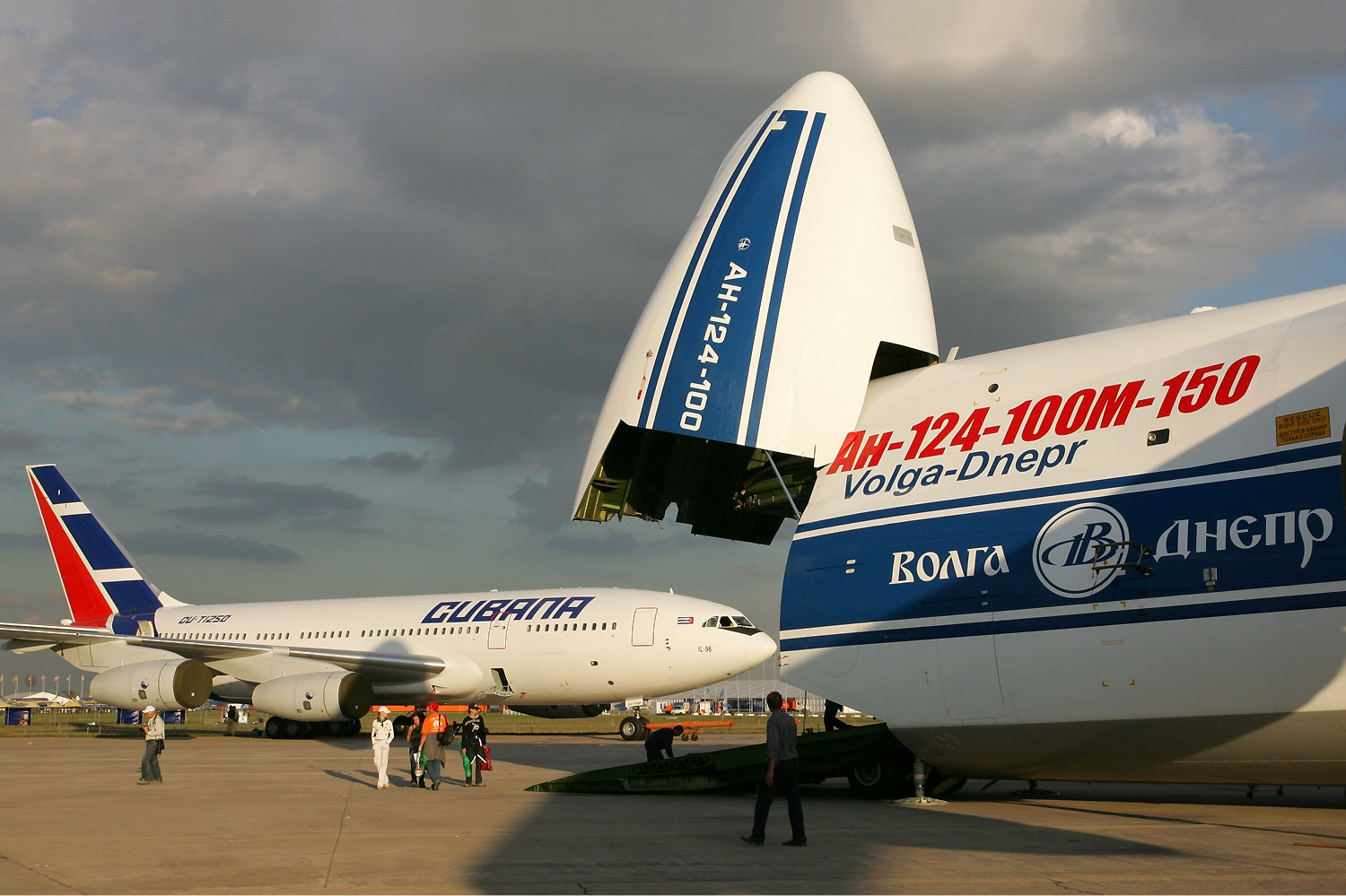
Volga-Dnepr Antonov An-124-100M-150 with nose door open at MAKS 2005, Moscow – Zhukovskiy; Cubana de Aviación Ilyushin Il-96 in background

An-124 Ruslan
Strategic heavy airlift transport aircraft
An-124-100
Commercial transport aircraft
An-124-100M-150
Version with a payload increased to 150 tonnes (maximum takeoff weight 420 tonnes), with uprated Lotarev D-18T series 4 engines; one An-124-100 converted
An-124-102 Slon
Commercial transport version with an EFIS flight deck, developed by TsAGi
An-124-115M
Planned new variant with EFIS based on Rockwell Collins avionic parts
An-124-130
Proposed version
An-124-135
Variant with one seat in the rear and the rest of the cargo area (approx. 1,800 square feet) dedicated to freight
An-124-200
Proposed version with General Electric CF6-80C2 engines, each rated at 59,200 lbf (263 kN)
An-124-210
Joint proposal with Air Foyle to meet UK's Short Term Strategic Airlifter (STSA) requirement, with Rolls-Royce RB211-524H-T engines, each rated 60,600 lbf (264 kN) and Honeywell avionics—STSA competition abandoned in August 1999, reinstated, and won by the Boeing C-17A.
An-124-300
The -300 is planned variant with upgraded engines with higher thrust. Variant was ordered by the Russian Aerospace Forces in 2020.

== Operators ==
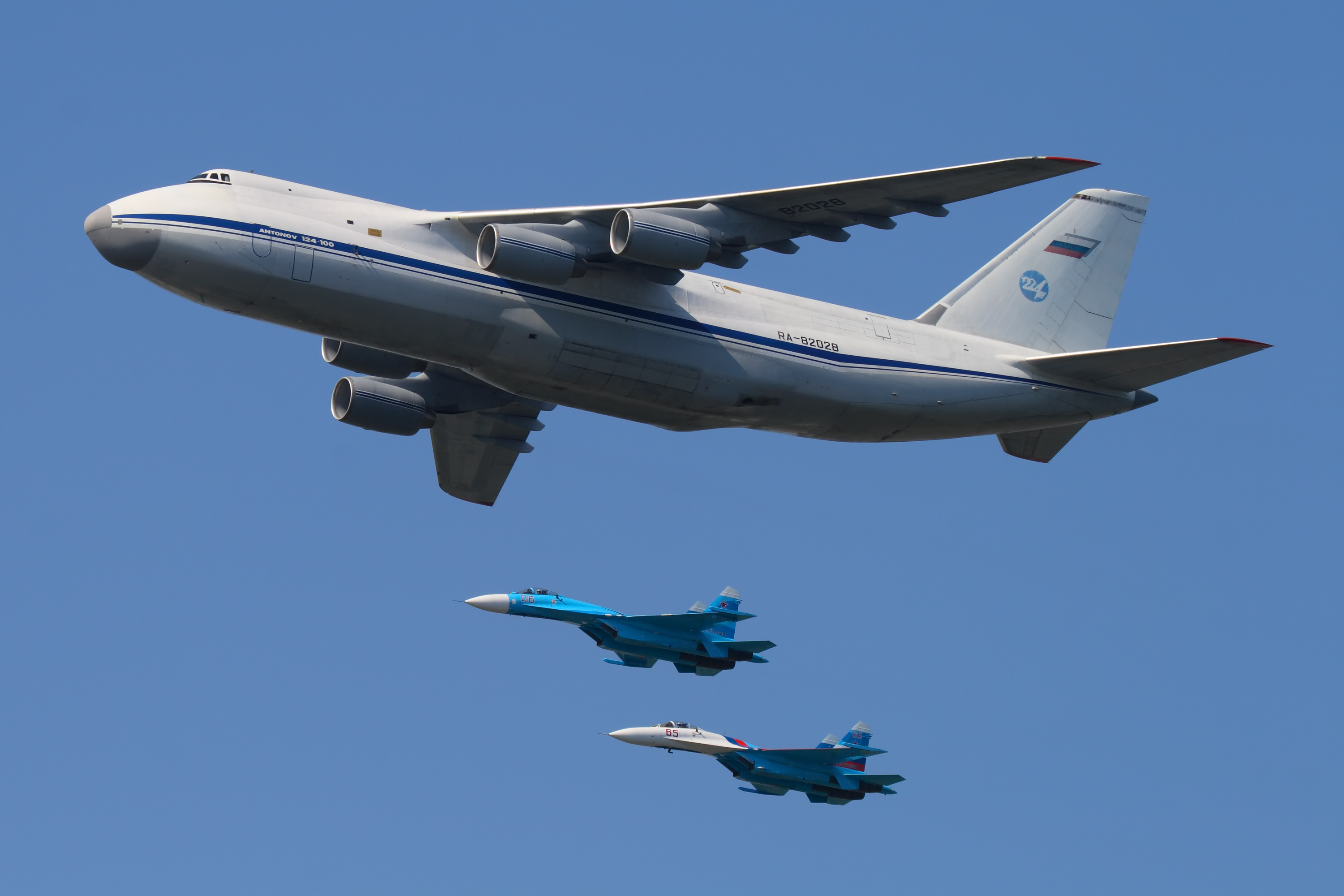
224th Flight Unit An-124 inflight with two Sukhoi Su-27s of the Russian Falcons at the 2010 Moscow Victory Day Parade

== Notable accidents ==
As of November 2020, five accidents with An-124 hull losses have been recorded involving a total of 97 fatalities, including:

- On 13 October 1992, СССР-82002, operated by Antonov Airlines, crashed near Kyiv, Ukraine during flight testing, suffering nose cargo door failure during high-speed descent (part of test program) resulting in total loss of control. The airplane came down in a forest near Kyiv, killing eight of the nine crew onboard.
- On 15 November 1993, RA-82071, operated by Aviastar Airlines, crashed into a mountain at 11,000 feet (3,400 m) while in a holding pattern at Kerman, Iran. There were 17 fatalities.
- On 8 October 1996, RA-82069, owned by Aeroflot but operated by Ajax Cargo as Aeroflot Flight 9981, crashed at San Francesco al Campo, Italy, while initiating a go-around after a low visibility approach on Turin Caselle Airport's runway 36. There were four fatalities.
- On 6 December 1997, RA-82005, operated by the Russian Air Force, crashed in a residential area after takeoff in Irkutsk, Russia. All 23 people onboard and 45 people on the ground were killed.
- On 13 November 2020, the second engine of RA-82042, operated by Volga-Dnepr Airlines, suffered an uncontained engine failure after takeoff from Novosibirsk, Russia. Subsequently, after landing there, the aircraft suffered a runway excursion and the nose landing gear collapsed. On 25 November, the airline voluntarily grounded its entire fleet of An-124 aircraft. By 29 December, the first Volga-Dnepr An-124-100 was back in service.

== Specifications (An-124-100M) ==
Three sides view

Payload–range diagram

Data from Jane's all the World's Aircraft 2006-07, Volga-Dnepr

General characteristics

- Crew: Eight (pilot, copilot, navigator, chief flight engineer, electrical flight engineer, radio operator, two loadmasters)
- Capacity: 88 passengers in upper aft fuselage, or the hold can take an additional 350 pax on a palletised seating system / 120,000 kg (264,555 lb)
- Length: 69.1 m (226 ft 8 in)
- Wingspan: 73.3 m (240 ft 6 in)
- Height: 21.08 m (69 ft 2 in)
- Wing area: 628 m^{2} (6,760 sq ft)
- Aspect ratio: 8.6
- Airfoil: TsAGI Supercritical
- Empty weight: 181,000 kg (399,037 lb)
- Max takeoff weight: 402,000 kg (886,258 lb) * Maximum landing weight: 330,000 kg (727,525 lb)
- Fuel capacity: 210,172 kg (463,343 lb) / 262,715.15 L (69,402.00 US gal; 57,789.25 imp gal)
- Powerplant: 4 × Progress D-18T (D-18 Series 4 on -150 models) high-bypass turbofan engines, 226.8 kN (51,000 lbf) thrust each

Performance

- Cruise speed: 865 km/h (537 mph, 467 kn) max

800–850 km/h (500–530 mph; 430–460 kn) at FL 328-394 (32,800–39,400 ft (9,997–12,009 m) at regional pressure setting)

- Approach speed: 230–260 km/h (140–160 mph; 120–140 kn)
- Range: 3,700 km (2,300 mi, 2,000 nmi) with max payload

8,400 km (5,200 mi; 4,500 nmi) with 80,000 kg (176,370 lb) payload
11,500 km (7,100 mi; 6,200 nmi) with 40,000 kg (88,185 lb) payload

- Ferry range: 14,000 km (8,700 mi, 7,600 nmi) with max fuel and minimum payload
- Service ceiling: 12,000 m (39,000 ft) max certified altitude
- Wing loading: 640.1 kg/m^{2} (131.1 lb/sq ft)
- Thrust/weight: 0.23
- Takeoff run (maximum takeoff weight): 3,000 m (9,800 ft)
- Landing roll (maximum landing weight): 900 m (3,000 ft)

== See also ==
Related development

- Antonov An-225 Mriya

Aircraft of comparable role, configuration, and era

- Airbus Beluga
- Boeing 747-400F
- Boeing 747-8F
- Boeing C-17 Globemaster III
- Lockheed C-5 Galaxy
- Ilyushin PAK VTA
