= Aviastar Airlines Flight 051 =

1993 aviation accident in Iran

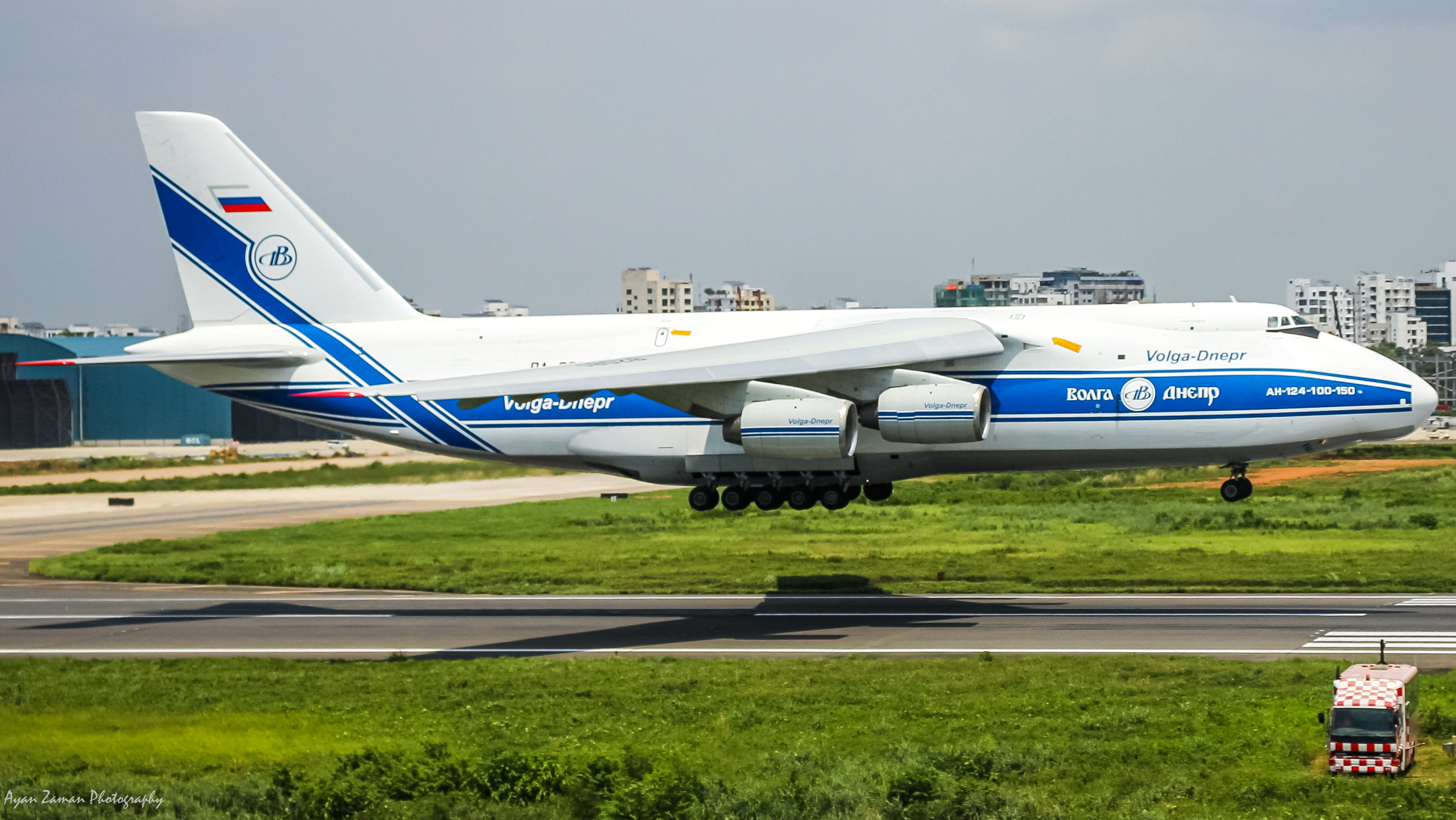
- RA-82081, An Antonov An-124, similar to the one involved

Accident
- Date: 15 November 1993
- Summary: Controlled flight into terrain; Pilot error
- Site: Joftan mountain, 35 km east of Kerman, Central District, Iran; 30°11′44.5″N 57°23′0.6″E

Aircraft
- Aircraft type: Antonov An-124-100
- Operator: Aviastar Airlines
- ICAO flight No.: FUE051
- Registration: RA-82071
- Flight origin: Dubai Airport, Dubai, UAE
- Stopover: Kerman Airport, Kerman, Iran
- Destination: Tashkent International Airport, Tashkent, Uzbekistan
- Occupants: 17
- Passengers: 3
- Crew: 14
- Fatalities: 17
- Survivors: 0

On 15 November 1993, Aviastar Flight 051, an Antonov An-124-100 returning from Dubai International Airport, United Arab Emirates, where it had operated a cargo flight previously that day, to Tashkent International Airport, Uzbekistan, crashed on Joftan mountain at 35 km east of Kerman, Iran, while performing a holding pattern on approach to Kerman Airport, where a refueling stopover was planned. All 14 crew members and three passengers on board were killed.

The accident was found to have been caused mainly by errors of the crew, which failed to identify their actual position, deviated from the flight path and didn't properly use the on-board radar; the pilots were also unfamiliar with the airport. Bad weather, air traffic control errors and the surrounding mountainous terrain also played a factor in the crash.

== Background ==
The aircraft involved was an Antonov An-124-100 registered as RA-82071, manufactured in 1993, and operated by the Russian airline Aviastar Airlines. Aviastar Airlines was the airline division of the aircraft factory Aviastar-SP, the same parent company of the airline Aviastar-TU, which operated between 1993 and 2004.

On board the aircraft, there were 14 crew members and three passengers. The crew members were captain Anatoly Lubyanitsky, first officer Vladimir Lubyanitsky, the two navigators Ivakh S.N. and Sysoev A.V., the flight engineers Tarasenko G.K, Romanenko A.I., Starodubtsev A.I., Gavrilov N.L., Kislyuk V.N., Chentsov E.M. and the technicians Dubrovsky S.L., Goncharov V.V., Aitov V.P. and Kuznetsov R.V.

== Accident ==
The aircraft took off from Dubai Airport, United Arab Emirates, and it was scheduled to fly to Tashkent International Airport, Uzbekistan; a stopover to refuel the plane was planned at Kerman Airport in Iran. While the aircraft was approaching its stopover in Kerman, the air traffic control instructed the crew to enter a holding pattern. The crew entered the pattern, but failed to maintain the correct route. The aircraft then deviated in a northern direction, while being at about 47 km from the airport, and started the descent from flight level FL270 (8200 m) to flight level FL170 (5200 m).

At a distance of 45 km from the airport, Flight 051 was cleared to land on runway 34 at Kerman Airport, even though the visibility there was under the minimum established for continuing the approach. This resulted in the crew making a turn and starting to descend to flight level FL110 (3300 m). But the aircraft then passed the airport, without the crew noticing, and continued its descent.

At 7:04 pm local time, Flight 051, at a speed of nearly 400 km/h, impacted mountainous terrain at an altitude of 3400 m. All 17 people on board were killed. After the crash, the aircraft also caught fire. Initial accounts of the accident reported the crashed aircraft to be Canadian, and operated by the airline Atlantair.

== Investigation ==
The investigation found out that the main cause of the crash was pilot error, which led to a controlled flight into terrain. The crew in fact failed to correctly identify the actual position of the aircraft, causing them to deviate from the planned flight path without noticing. Air traffic control's failure to notice the deviation also contributed to the crash. Other contributing factors were the crew misusing the on-board radar of the plane, their inexperience with Kerman Airport,Iran and its surroundings and the weather at the airfield.
