= Liang Wengen =

Chinese entrepreneur (born 1956)

- 梁稳根
- Born: 梁永根; 1956 (age 69–70); Maotang, Lianyuan, Loudi, Hunan, China
- Education: Central South University
- Occupations: Founder and chairman of Sany Heavy Industry
- Children: 1
- Relatives: Unknown

Liang Wengen (Chinese: 梁稳根; pinyin: Liáng Wěngēn; born 1956) is a Chinese entrepreneur who founded and is the chairman of Sany Heavy Industry. In 2011, he became the richest man in mainland China with a net worth of about US$8 billion. As of November 2018, he is the 68th richest person in China, with a net worth of about $3.5 billion.

== Biography ==
He was born to a poor peasant family in Maotang, a small town in Lianyuan, Loudi, Hunan province in 1956.

Liang has a bachelor's degree from Central South University.

Liang worked as a top manager at a state arms plant, before getting involved in the construction-equipment industry. He is the founder and main shareholder of Sany Group, a heavy industry manufacturer based in Changsha, Hunan.

Liang is a member of the Communist Party and was elected to the party's National Congress.

== Personal life ==
Liang is married and has one son, Liang Zhizhong. He lives in Changsha.
