= Palfinger Marine =

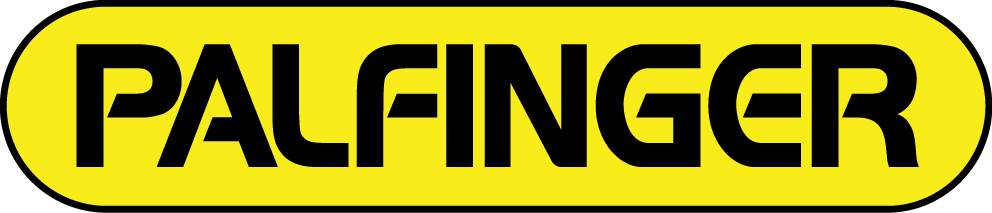
- Company type: GesmbH
- Industry: Engineering
- Headquarters: Salzburg, Austria
- Products: marine-, offshore-, and wind cranes, winches, handling/access equipment, slipway systems, boats, and davits
- Website: www.palfingermarine.com

PALFINGER MARINE is an international manufacturer of innovative deck equipment and lifesaving appliances. The company is part of the Palfinger Group, a leading manufacturer of cranes and lifting equipment. Palfinger Marine's headquarter is in Salzburg and the company has 25 sales and service hubs in Europe, Asia, North- and South America, the Middle East, and Africa.

== Products ==
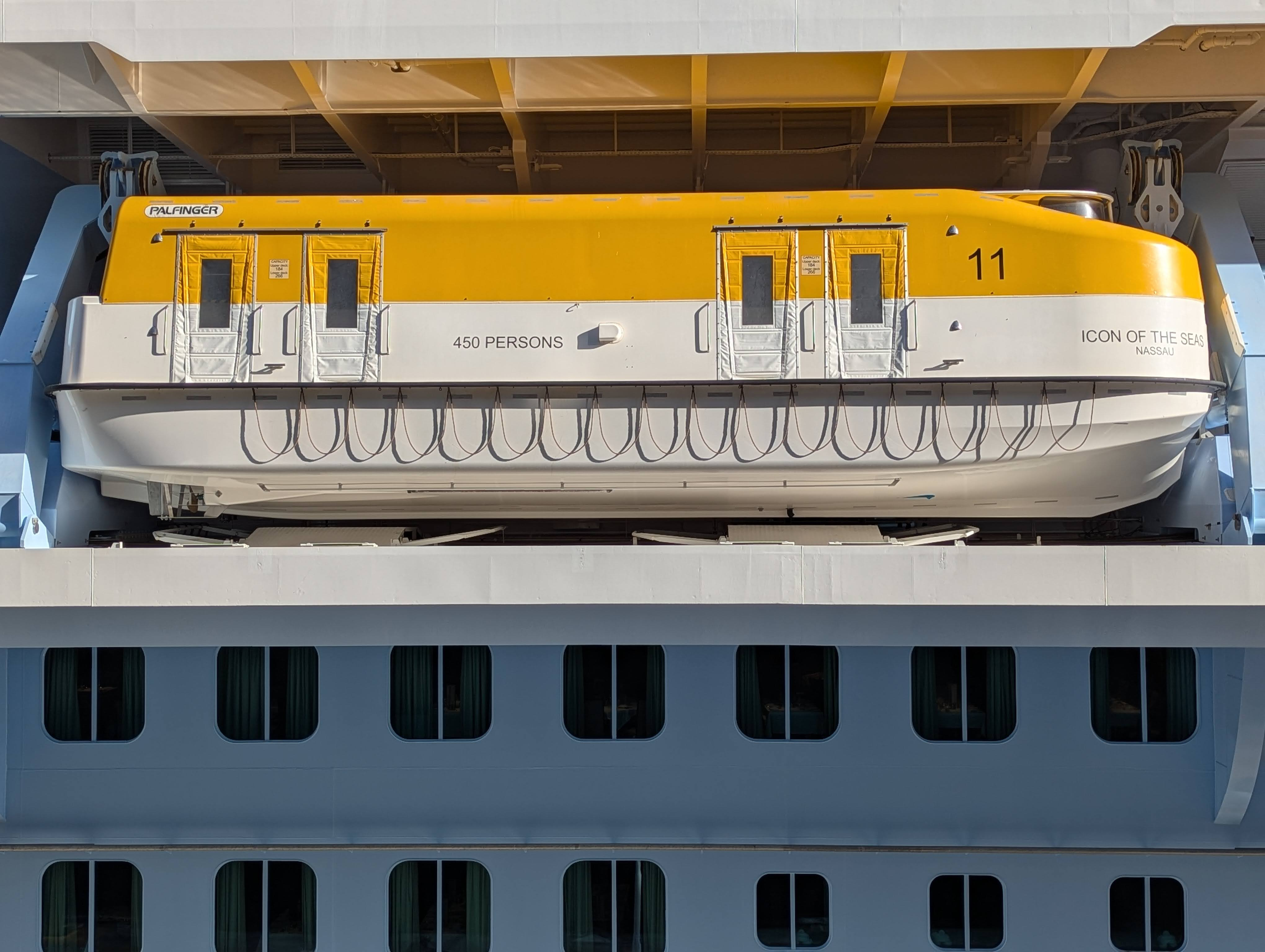

- Marine Cranes
- Wind Cranes
- Offshore Cranes
- Winches
- Lifting and Handling Equipment
- Slipway and Stern Entry Systems
- Access Equipment
- Life- and Rescue Boats
- Military and Professional Boats
- Davits
- Fenders

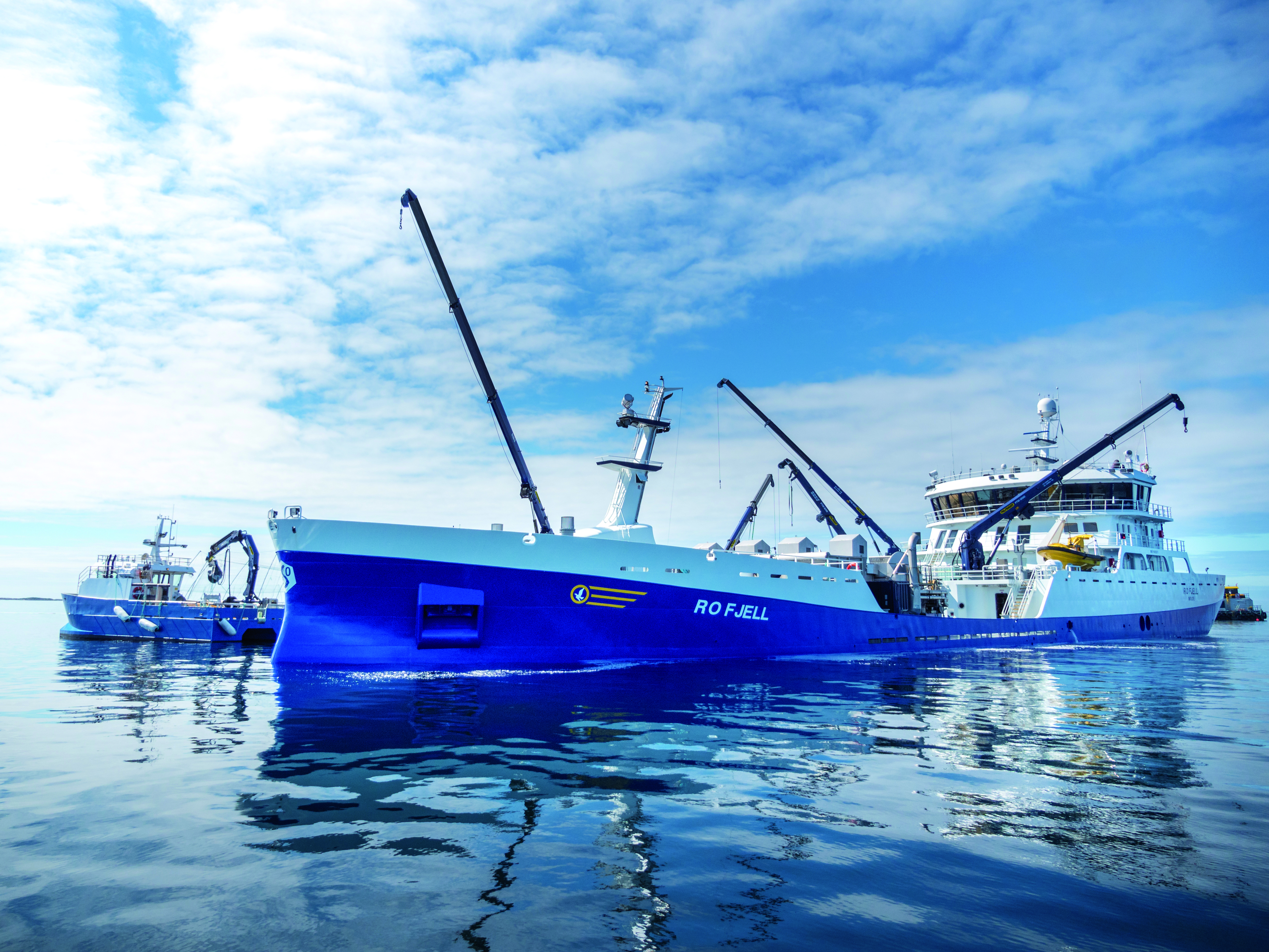
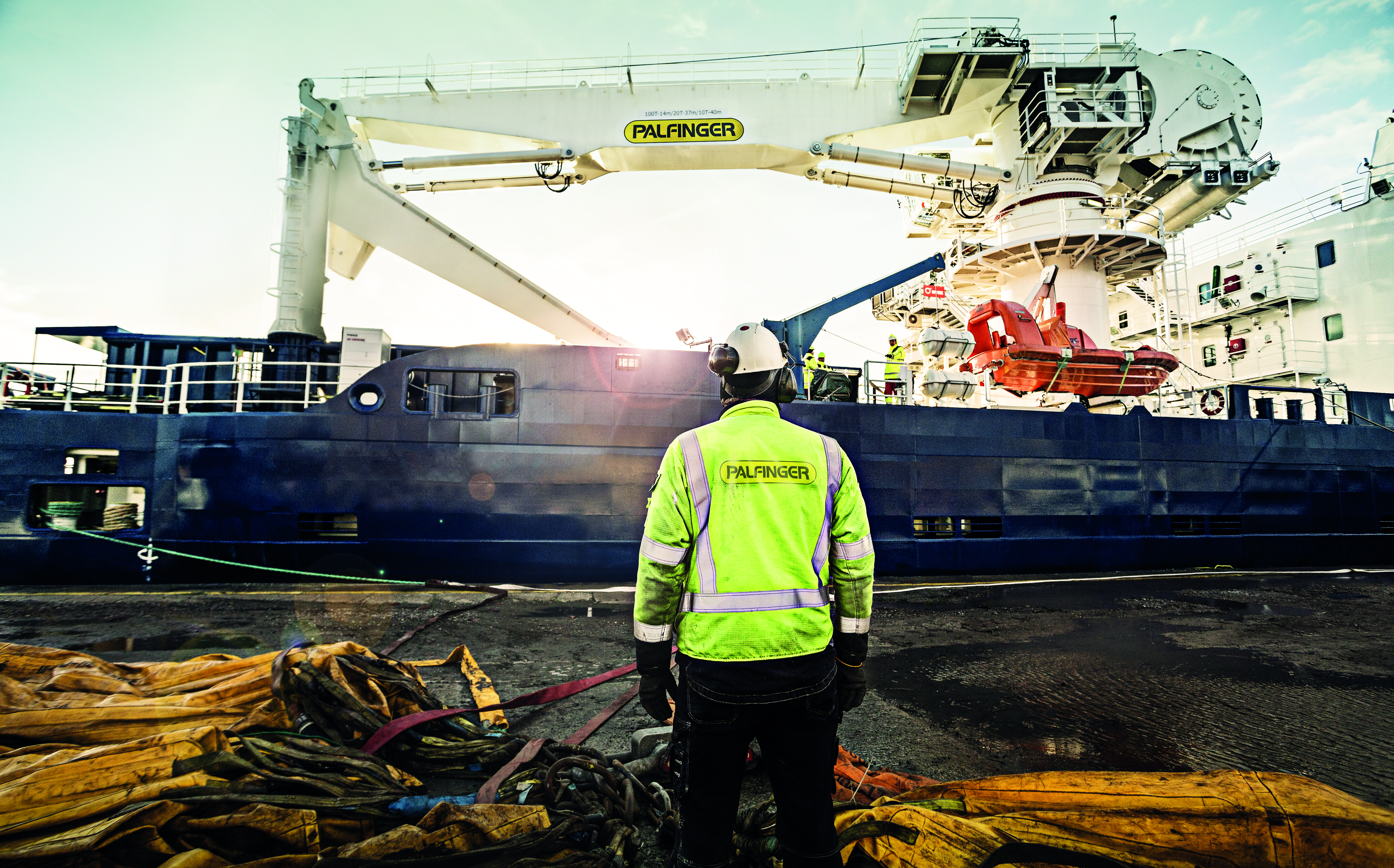

== Expansion ==
In 2010, PALFINGER acquired Ned-Deck Marine, a dutch manufacturer of launch and recovery systems, and Ned-Decks subsidiary company Fast RSQ, a boat manufacturer. In 2012, PALFINGER took over Bergen Group Dreggen, a Norwegian manufacturer of offshore and marine cranes with a lifting capacity over 330 mt. All companies have been integrated and renamed to PALFINGER NED-DECK, PALFINGER DREGGEN and PALFINGER BOATS. In January 2015, PALFINGER finalized the acquisition of Norwegian Deck Machinery AS (NDM).

== Branding ==
With March 2016, the acquired companies Ned-Deck Marine, Dreggen and Norwegian Deck Machinery (NDM) have been integrated under one umbrella brand and one corporate logo "PALFINGER MARINE". The product portfolio now consists of marine-, offshore-, and wind cranes, boats, davits, and winches as well as handling/access equipment, and slipway systems. PALFINGER's marine business is a supplier for deck equipment and lifesaving appliances for the whole maritime industry.

== Acquisitions ==
In May 2016, the PALFINGER Group signs acquisition 100 per cent of the shares in Herkules Harding Holding AS and thus, the globally operating Harding Group, headquartered in Seimsfoss, Norway. In June 2016, PALFINGER intends to make a takeover bid for Norwegian TTS Group ASA.

== Locations ==
Europe

- Salzburg, Austria
- Seimsfoss, Norway
- Nesttun, Norway
- Schiedam, Netherlands
- Odense, Denmark
- Gosport, United Kingdom
- Dägeling, Germany
- Livorno, Italy
- Cadiz, Spain

America

- New Iberia, Louisiana, USA
- Pompano Beach, Florida, USA
- Anacortes, Washington, USA
- Portsmouth, Virginia, USA
- Langley, Canada
- Rio de Janeiro, Brasil

Asia

- Singapore
- Shanghai, China
- Hong Kong, China
- Tokyo, Japan
- Dubai, UAE
- Abu Dhabi, UAE
- Doha, Qatar
- Al-Khobar, KSA

== Production ==
- Harderwijk, The Netherlands
- Gdynia, Poland
- Maribor, Slovenia
- Hanoi, Vietnam
- Qingdao, China
