= Maotang, Lianyuan =

Maotang Town 茅塘镇
- Town
- Location in Hunan
- Coordinates: 27°34′09″N 111°45′53″E
- Country: People's Republic of China
- Province: Hunan
- Prefecture-level city: Loudi
- County-level city: Lianyuan

Area
  - Total: 58.76 km^{2} (22.69 sq mi)

Population
  - Total: 35,000
  - Density: 600/km^{2} (1,500/sq mi)
- Time zone: UTC+8 (China Standard)
- Area code: 0738

Maotang Town (simplified Chinese: 茅塘镇; traditional Chinese: 茅塘鎮; pinyin: Máotáng Zhèn) is an urban town in Lianyuan, Hunan Province, People's Republic of China. "Maotang, Lianyuan" (Map). Google Maps.

== Administrative division ==
The town is divided into 25 villages and 1 community: Shimen Community, Maotang Village, Wufeng Village, Daotong Village, Longjing Village, Wenxi Village, Shixiao Village, Gaoshan Village, Shipai Village, Yangping Village, Shuiquan Village, Yongfu Village, Shuibi Village, Guangyang Village, Fulu Village, Outang Village, Maxi Village, Fenglin Village, Dongmen Village, Shimen Village, Shixiang Village, Dafang Village, Fuxi Village, Shuzhuang Village, Jiushi Village, and Shahe Village. (石门社区、茅塘村、五峰村、道童村、龙井村、温溪村、石校村、高山村、石碑村、阳坪村、水泉村、永付村、水碧村、光阳村、福禄村、藕塘村、马溪村、枫林村、洞门村、石门村、柿香村、大方村、富溪村、梳装村、久施村、沙河村).

== Notable people from Maotang ==
- Liang Wengen, a Chinese entrepreneur
