= Palfinger =

Technology manufacturing company in Austria

PALFINGER AG
- Type: Stock Company
- Industry: Engineering
- Founded: 1932
- Founder: Richard Palfinger
- Headquarters: Bergheim, Salzburg-Umgebung (Salzburg (state)/Austria)
- Key people: Andreas Klauser (CEO); Felix Strohbichler (CFO); Alexander Susanek (COO); Maria Koller (CHRO)
- Revenue: ▲€2.34bn (2025)
- Number of employees: 12,058 (2025)
- Website: www.palfinger.com/en-us

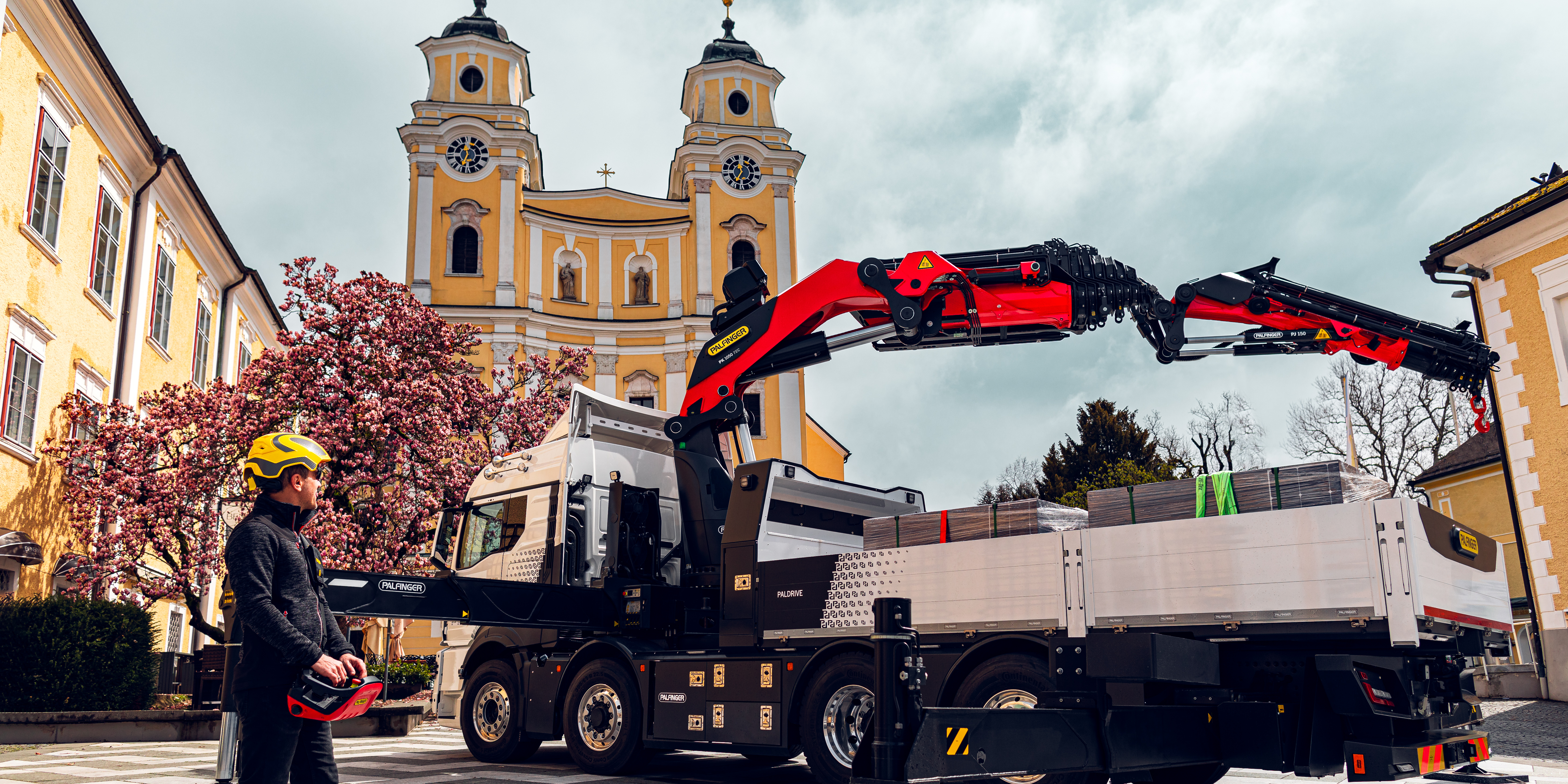
Palfinger PK 1050 TEC crane

Palfinger AG (stylized as PALFINGER AG), headquartered in Bergheim, Austria, is a publicly traded machinery manufacturing company for hydraulic crane and lifting equipment. The company, founded in 1932, is known for manufacturing truck-mounted loader cranes.

With over 100 models of this product, Palfinger is considered a global market leader.

== History ==
=== 1930s to 1960s: Foundation and orientation ===
The history of Palfinger dates back to 1932, with the founding of a repair shop for agricultural trailers, tippers, and vehicle bodies by Richard Palfinger. The company built its first crane in 1959, and when Richard's son Hubert took over management in 1964, production was switched to hydraulic loader cranes.

=== 1970s to 2000s: Internationalization and expansion ===
In the following years, the focus was on expanding the product range and internationalizing the company. In 1984, the company opened an assembly and manufacturing plant in Lengau with 90 employees. By 1989, Palfinger had expanded into over 70 countries and achieved an export rate of over 90%. In 1993, a plant was acquired in Maribor, Slovenia. Additionally, Palfinger opened a plant for the production of skip loaders in France. To further expand its business in the U.S. market, Palfinger acquired the American crane dealer Tiffin Loader Cranes and established Palfinger USA Inc. Furthermore, in 2001, the company acquired a partner in the South American market by acquiring the Brazilian company Madal.

The company went public in June 1999. In 2004, Palfinger acquired Bison Deutschland, a provider of truck-mounted aerial work platforms. A year later, the company acquired the British producer of tail lifts and entry systems, Ratcliff Tail Lifts. In 2005, the company opened an Asia headquarter in Singapore along with other locations in Asia. Additionally, Palfinger invested in its existing production sites in Bulgaria, Slovenia, Eastern Germany, and the USA.

In 2008, Palfinger acquired the American company Omaha Standard in Iowa, which manufactures truck bodies and liftgates for pickups. Additionally, they acquired the aerial work platform division of the German company Wumag. In 2009, Palfinger purchased the container handling system manufacturer Automated Waste Equipment (AWE) in New Jersey, as well as acquiring an 80% stake in the aerial work platform manufacturer Eti Inc. in Oklahoma. The following year, Palfinger entered the marine crane market through the acquisition of 75% of the Dutch company Ned-Deck Marine.

=== 2010s: Growth through collaborations ===
In 2010, Palfinger acquired the marine and wind crane division of Palfinger Systems. In 2012, a collaboration with the Chinese construction machinery manufacturer Sany Heavy Industries (Sany) began, resulting in the construction of a plant in Changsha. That same year, Palfinger acquired the Brazilian metal component producer Tercek and the Norwegian Bergen Group Dreggen AS, which produces marine and offshore cranes. In 2013, Palfinger, together with the company Sky Aces Srl., founded Palfinger Platforms Italy, which is active in the development, production, and sale of aerial work platforms. At that time, the company operated over 29 facilities in 18 countries. Additionally, Sany acquired 10% of the shares in Palfinger, while Palfinger acquired 10% of the shares in Sany Lifting Ltd.

In 2015, the new company headquarters in Bergheim was opened, accompanied by investments ranging from €3 million to €6 million in expanding the production site in Löbau. The following year, Palfinger acquired the Norwegian Harding Group, which almost doubled its business in the marine sector. In the fiscal year 2016, Palfinger achieved a revenue of €1.36 billion. Furthermore, Sany reduced its stake to 7.5%.

In June 2018, Andreas Klauser took over as the CEO.

=== 2020s: Expansion of Locations and Sales ===
In 2020, Palfinger acquired its second-largest independent distributor worldwide, Hinz Försäljnings, based in Sweden, and the following year took over the Spanish distributor Equipdraulic. The cross-shareholding with the Sany Group of 7.5% was dissolved by the end of 2021. Furthermore, Palfinger began expanding the technology center in Köstendorf with investments totaling €5 million. In the same year, Palfinger acquired the companies TSK Kran und Wechselsysteme GmbH and TSR Lacktechnik. Additionally, they acquired the rights to the Offshore Passenger Transfer System (OPTS) technology from Lift2Work B.V. In the fiscal year 2023, the company surpassed the revenue threshold of €2 billion for the first time.

In 2022, Palfinger opened a new location in Vienna called The Hub Vienna and relocated the truck-mounted aerial work platform production from Krefeld to Löbau. The company also opened the Palfinger Campus as a training and education center and Palfinger World at its site in Lengau. In June 2023, Palfinger established a central hub for its activities in the USA in Schaumburg, Illinois. In 2023, Palfinger signed a ten-year contract with the Norwegian oil exploration and development company Aker BP for the development and market introduction of remote-controlled offshore cranes. In implementing this project, Palfinger is collaborating with the software developer Optilift.

== Corporate structure ==
Palfinger achieved a revenue of €2.45 billion in the fiscal year 2023 with 12,728 employees. For the fiscal year 2023, the company generated 59.9% of its revenue in the EMEA region. North America accounted for 24.7% of the revenue. The company has production and sales locations in Europe, North and South America, as well as Asia. Palfinger has more than 5,000 sales and service points in more than 130 countries. The Palfinger family directly or indirectly holds 56.4% of the company's shares, making them the main shareholder.

=== Ownership structure ===
As of: January 2024
Name	Anteil (in Prozent)
Palfinger family	56.2
Free float	43.8

Since June 1999 Palfinger has been listed on the official market of the Vienna Stock Exchange. The shares of Palfinger AG have also been traded on the OTC market of the Stuttgart, Berlin, Düsseldorf, and Frankfurt stock exchanges since mid-June 2000.

== Products ==
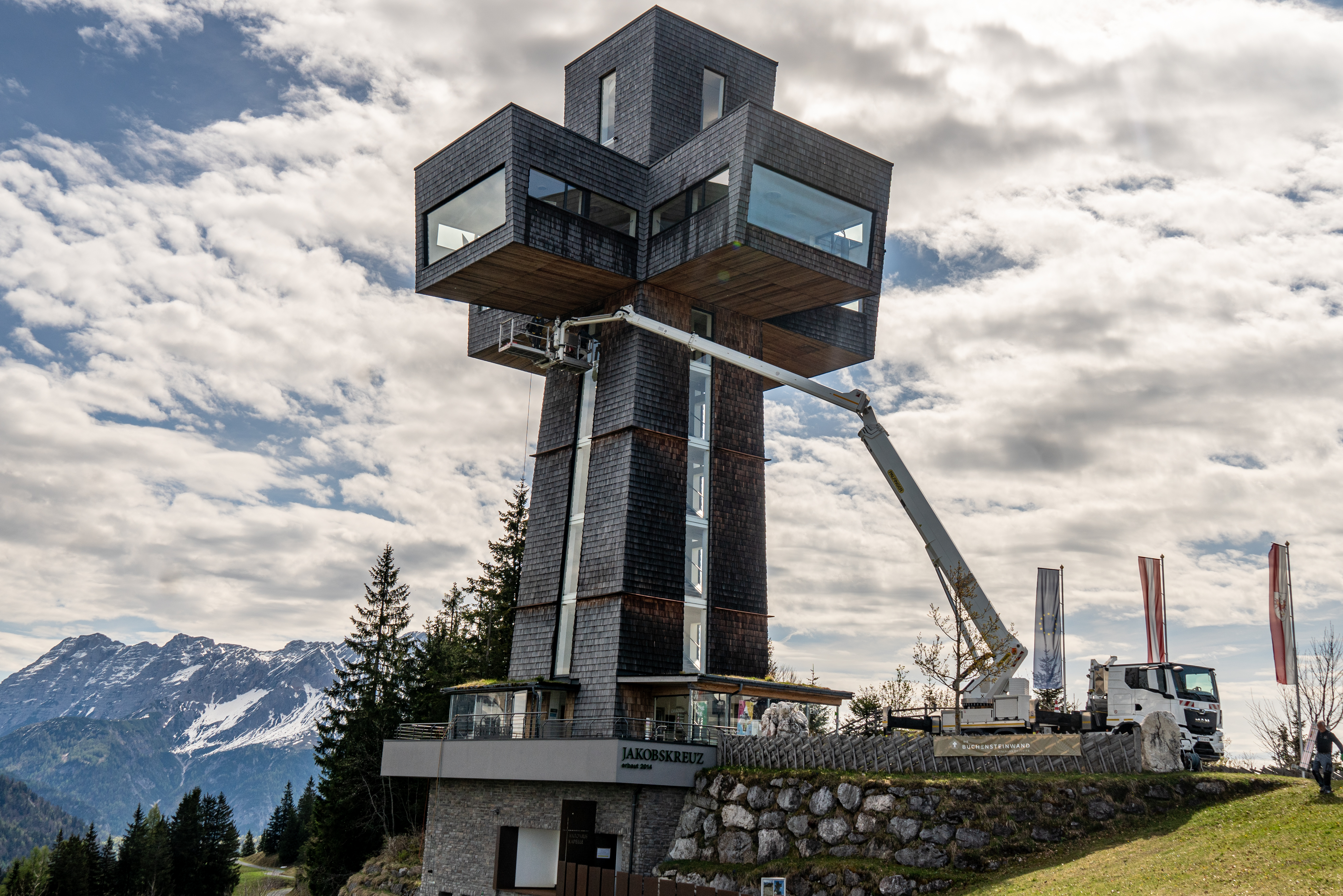
Palfinger AWP at Jakobskreuz

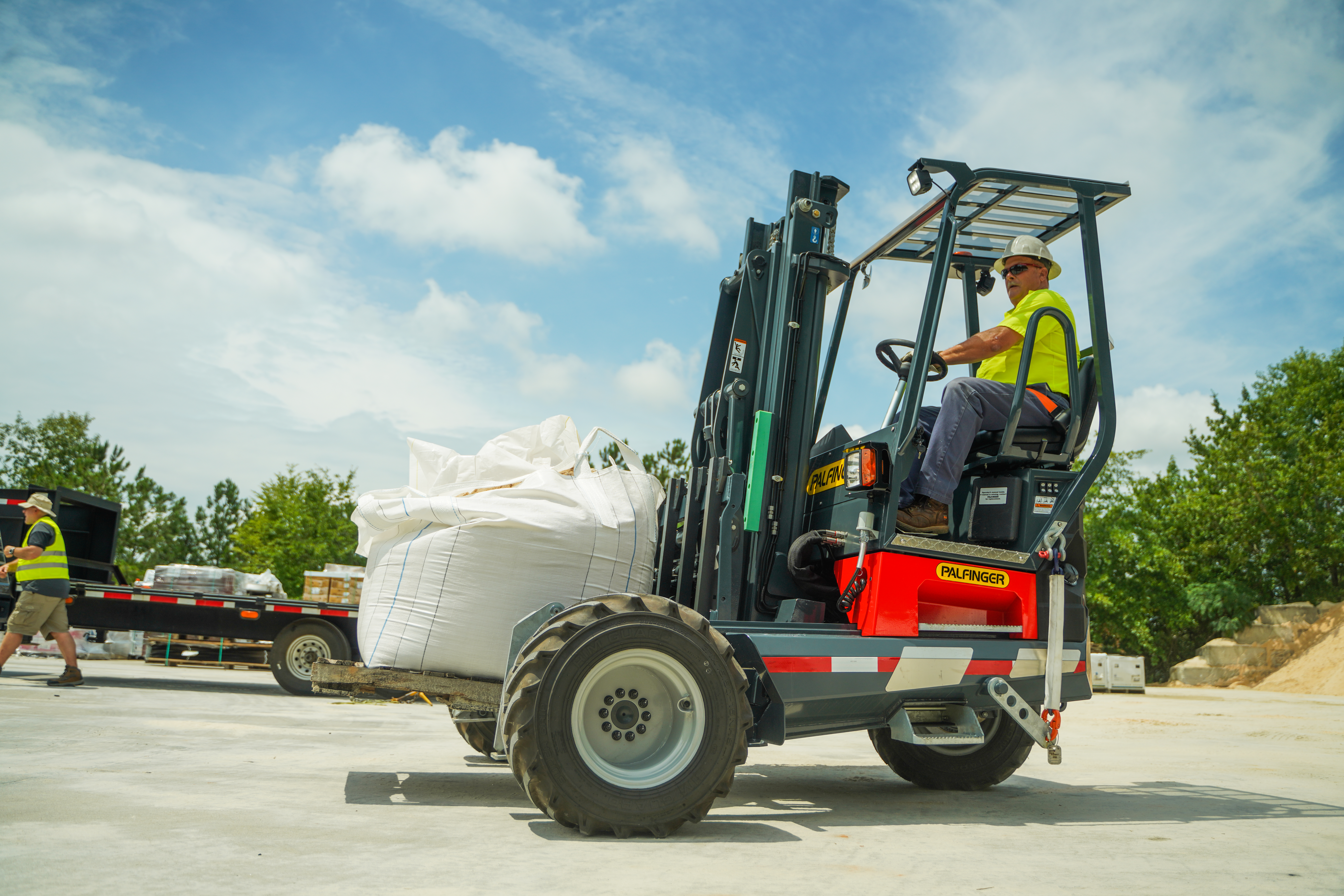
Palfinger TMF FHS 55 forklift

The main product of Palfinger AG is the loader crane, Palfinger has over 100 models of this product and is the world market leader in this field. The company manufactures access platforms, truck-mounted forklifts, loader cranes, timber and recycling cranes, marine cranes, wind cranes, hooklifts, and railway systems.

Palfinger produces a number of different types of lifting technologies for specialized and more general applications:

* Loader cranes
- Timber and recycling cranes
- Access platforms
- Hooklifts and skip loaders
- Railway systems
- Tail lifts
- Passenger boarding systems
- Truck mounted forklift
- Crawler cranes
- Factory mounting
- Boats and davit systems
- Wind cranes
- Marine and offshore cranes

Additionally, for the North American market, Palfinger also offers specific products such as Truck mounted forklifts.
