= List of power stations in Colorado =

Sources of Colorado utility-scale electric energy generation in gigawatt-hours, full-year 2025:
1. Natural gas: 18,112 (31.9%)
2. Wind: 17,118 (30.2%)
3. Coal: 14,018 (24.7%)
4. Solar: 5,586 (9.84%)
5. Hydroelectric: 1,852 (3.26%)
6. Biomass: 75 (0.13%)

This is a list of electric power generation stations in the U.S. state of Colorado, sorted by type and name. In 2024, Colorado has a total summer capacity of 19.8 GW through all of its power plants, and net generation of 58,798 GWh. In 2025 the electrical energy generation mix was 31.9% natural gas, 30.2% wind, 24.7% coal, 9.8% solar, 3.3% hydroelectric, and 0.1% biomass.

Small-scale solar, including customer-owned photovoltaic panels, delivered an additional net 2,233 GWh to Colorado's electricity grid in 2025. This compares as about 40 percent of the amount generated by the state's utility-scale photovoltaic plants. In 2004, Colorado became the first state with a voter-approved renewable portfolio standard (RPS). The RPS requires 30% of electricity sold by investor-owned utilities to come from renewable energy sources by 2020, with 3% from distributed generation.

Wind turbines on Colorado's high eastern plains are productive year-round and continued to proliferate in 2021. Coal has been undergoing replacement with natural gas and renewables in the state's electricity portfolio. Half of the coal mined in Colorado was exported in 2019, and extraction of the states's oil and gas reserves increased to record-high levels.

As coal power plants are closed and some new solar projects delayed, a 270 MW shortfall was projected for the 2024 peak summer load.

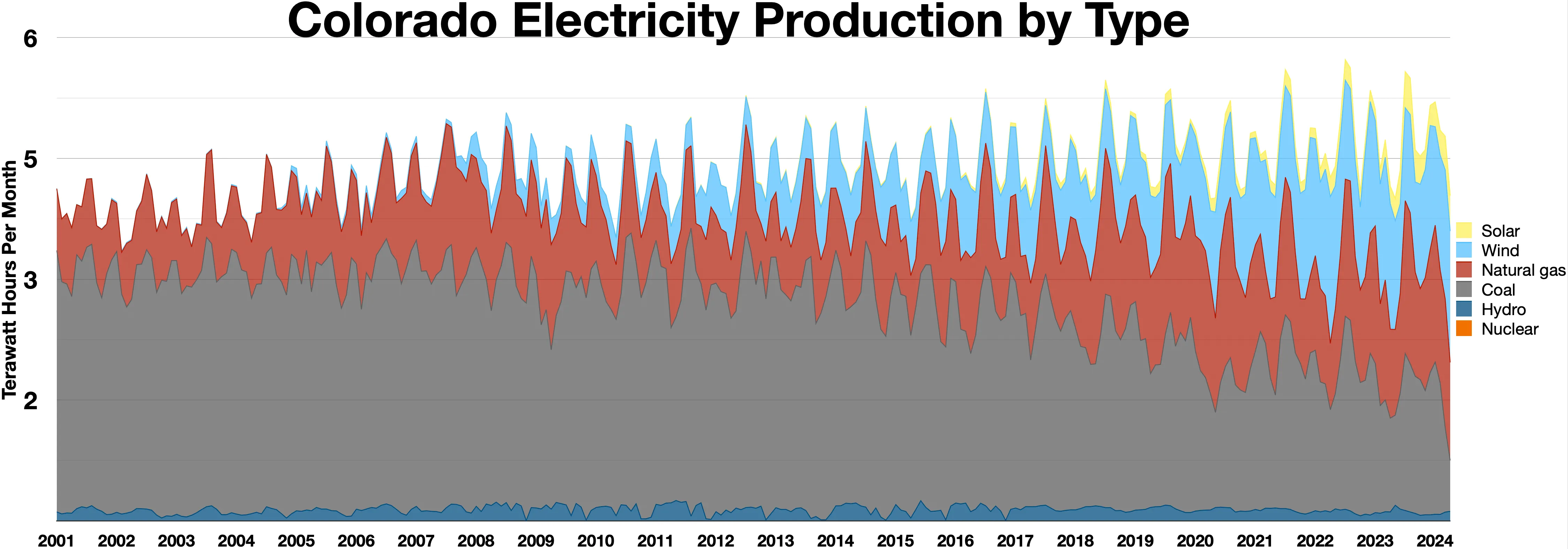
Colorado electricity production by type

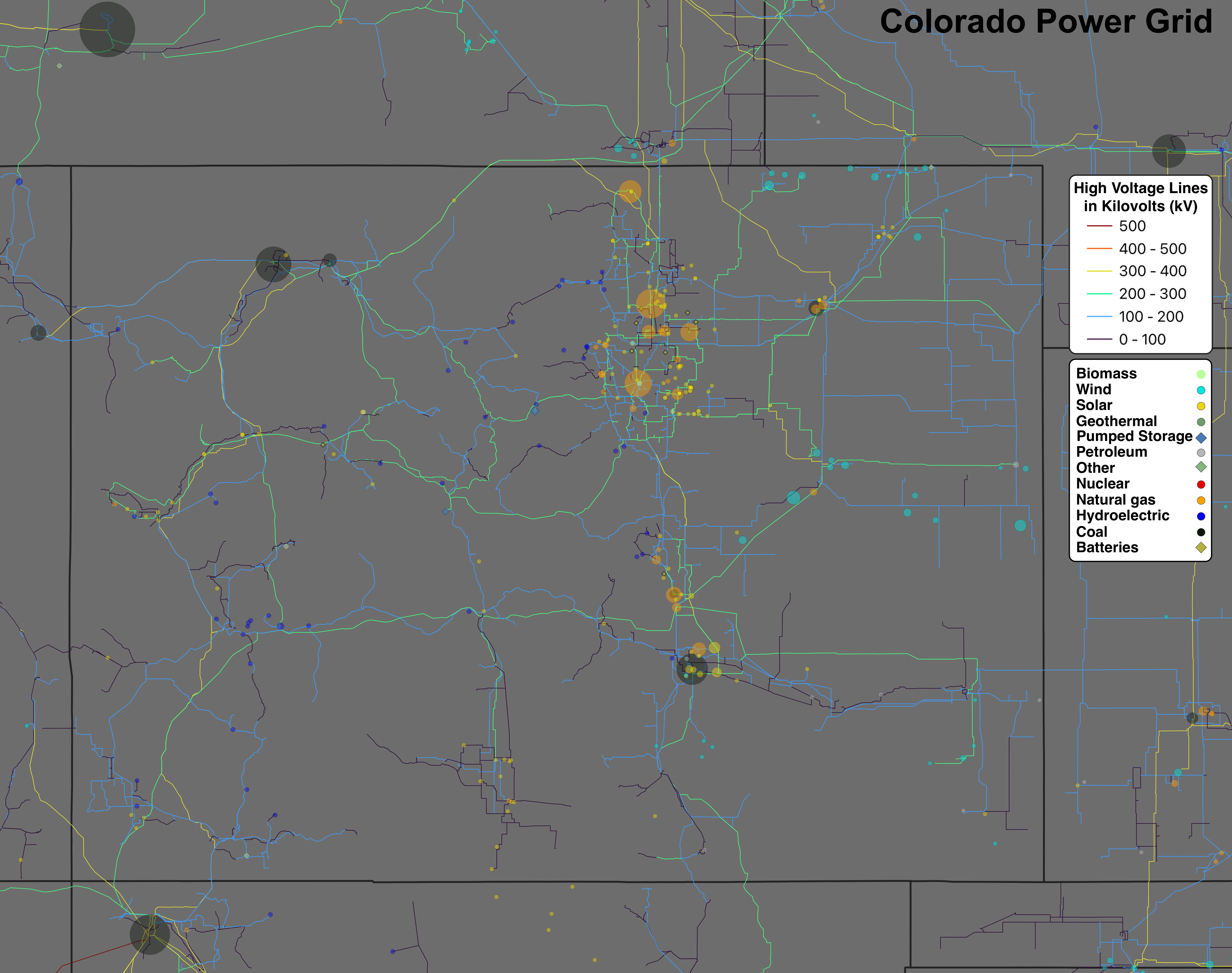
Colorado power grid

== Nuclear power stations ==
The Fort St. Vrain Nuclear Power Plant generated 330 MW of electricity during years 1976 to 1989. Decommissioning and removal of the nuclear components was completed in 1992. The first natural gas combustion turbine was installed in 1995. Colorado had no utility-scale plants that used fissile material as a fuel in 2022.

== Fossil-fuel power stations ==
Data from the U.S. Energy Information Administration serves as a general reference.

=== Coal-fired ===
| Name | Location | Coordinates | Capacity (MW) | Year completed | Scheduled retirement | Refs |
|---|---|---|---|---|---|---|
| Comanche Generating Station | Pueblo County | 38°12′29″N 104°34′29″W | 1,410 | 1973 - Unit 1; 1975 - Unit 2; 2010 - Unit 3 | 2022 - Unit 1; 2025 - Unit 2; 2031 - Unit 3 | |
| Craig Generating Station | Moffat County | 40°27′46″N 107°35′28″W | 1,283 | 1981 - Unit 1; 1979 - Unit 2; 1984 - Unit 3 | 2025 - Unit 1; 2028 - Unit 2; 2029 - Unit 3 | |
| Pawnee Generating Station | Morgan County | 40°13′18″N 103°40′49″W | 505 | 1981 | 2025 | |
| Hayden Generating Station | Routt County | 40°29′08″N 107°11′06″W | 441 | 1965 - Unit 1; 1976 - Unit 2 | 2028 - Unit 1; 2027 - Unit 2 | |
| Rawhide Energy Station | Larimer County | 40°51′39″N 105°01′16″W | 280 | 1984 | 2030 | |
| Ray D Nixon Power Plant | El Paso County | 38°38′00″N 104°42′21″W | 208 | 1980 | 2030 | |
| Martin Drake Power Plant | El Paso County | 38°49′28″N 104°50′00″W | 185 | 1968 - Unit 6; 1974 - Unit 7 | 2021 - closed | |
| Nucla Station | Montrose County | 38°14′18″N 108°30′28″W | 100 | 1959 - Units 1-3; 1991 - Unit 4 | 2019 - closed | |
| Lamar Station | Prowers County | 38°02′00″N 102°32′16″W | 52 | 2008 | 2011 - closed | |

=== Natural gas-fired ===
| Name | Location | Coordinates | Capacity (MW) | Generation type | Year completed | Refs |
|---|---|---|---|---|---|---|
| Fort St. Vrain Generating Station | Weld County | 40°14′46″N 104°52′27″W | 969 | 3x1 combined cycle, simple cycle (x2) | 1996-2001/ 2009 | |
| Cherokee Generating Station | Adams County | 39°48′26″N 104°57′52″W | 928 | Steam turbine, 2x1 combined cycle | 1968/2015 | |
| Rocky Mountain Generating Station | Weld County | 40°05′27″N 104°35′43″W | 580 | 2x1 combined cycle | 2004 | |
| Front Range Power Plant | El Paso County | 38°37′41″N 104°42′25″W | 460 | 2x1 combined cycle | 2003 | |
| Pueblo Airport Generating Station | Pueblo County | 38°19′15″N 104°31′35″W | 440 | 2x1 combined cycle (x2); Simple cycle (x3) | 2012 | |
| Rawhide Energy Station | Larimer County | 40°51′39″N 105°01′16″W | 388 | Simple cycle (x5) | 2002/2004/ 2008 | |
| Brush Generating Station | Morgan County | 40°14′29″N 103°37′52″W | 307 | 1x1 combined cycle (x2); 2x1 combined cycle, Simple cycle | 1990/1994/ 1999-2002 | |
| Manchief Generating Station | Morgan County | 40°13′03″N 103°41′06″W | 300 | Simple cycle (x2) | 2000 | |
| Spindle Hill Energy Center | Weld County | 40°05′32″N 104°53′16″W | 300 | Simple cycle (x2) | 2007 | |
| J M Shafer Generating Station | Weld County | 40°05′55″N 104°46′25″W | 272 | 5x2 combined cycle | 2012 | |
| Blue Spruce Energy Center | AdamsCounty | 39°44′52″N 104°40′53″W | 264 | Simple cycle (x2) | 2003 | |
| Plains End Power Plant (I & II) | Jefferson County | 39°51′27″N 105°13′33″W | 231 | Reciprocating engine (x34) | 2002/2008 | |
| Fountain Valley Power Facility | El Paso County | 38°33′25″N 104°41′15″W | 240 | Simple cycle (x6) | 2001 | |
| Valmont Generating Station | Boulder County | 40°01′10″N 105°12′07″W | 227 | Simple cycle (x3) | 1973/2000 | |
| Knutson Power Plant | Adams County | 39°56′28″N 104°40′55″W | 140 | Simple cycle (x2) | 2002 | |
| Limon Generating Station | Lincoln County | 39°12′14″N 103°42′02″W | 140 | Simple cycle (x2) | 2002 | |
| Arapahoe Combustion Turbine | Denver County | 39°40′09″N 105°00′06″W | 122 | 3x1 combined cycle | 2000-2002 | |
| Fort Lupton Generating Station | Weld County | 40°05′32″N 104°47′46″W | 88 | Simple cycle (x2) | 1972 | |
| Rifle Generating Station | Garfield County | 39°31′02″N 107°43′48″W | 85 | 3x1 combined cycle | 1986 | |
| Ray D Nixon Power Plant | El Paso County | 38°38′00″N 104°42′21″W | 60 | Simple cycle (x2) | 1999 | |
| George Birdsall Plant | El Paso County | 38°52′53″N 104°49′01″W | 55 | Steam turbine (x3) | 1953-1954/ 1957 | |
| Colorado Energy Nations Plant | Jefferson County | 39°45′38″N 105°12′54″W | 40 | Steam turbine (x3) | 1976-1977/ 1983 | |
| UC Boulder Power Plant | Boulder County | 40°00′27″N 105°16′09″W | 31 | 2x1 combined cycle | 1992 | |
| Williams Ignacio Gas Plant^{[A]} | La Plata County | 37°08′44″N 107°47′05″W | 6.1 | Steam turbine ORC generator | 1984; 2014 | |
| OREG IV Peetz^{[A]} | Logan County | 40°59′33″N 102°51′11″W | 3.5 | ORC generator | 2009 | |

^{A} Waste heat recovery from gas turbines that are used to compress natural gas.

=== Petroleum-fired ===
| Name | Location | Coordinates | Capacity (MW) | Generation type | Year completed | Refs |
|---|---|---|---|---|---|---|
| Burlington | Kit Carson County | 39°21′22″N 102°14′35″W | 100 | Simple cycle (x2) | 1977 | |
| La Junta | Otero County | 37°59′15″N 103°32′48″W | 14.4 | Reciprocating engine (x7) | 1939/1942/1958/ 1962/1970 | |
| Airport Industrial | Pueblo County | 38°17′04″N 104°31′51″W | 10.0 | Reciprocating engine (x4) | 2002 | |
| Rocky Ford | Otero County | 38°02′57″N 103°42′49″W | 10.0 | Reciprocating engine (x5) | 1964 | |
| Pueblo | Pueblo County | 38°16′00″N 104°36′52″W | 8.0 | Reciprocating engine (x4) | 1964 | |
| Trinidad | Las Animas County | 37°10′44″N 104°29′15″W | 5.4 | Reciprocating engine (x3) | 1999 | |
| Las Animas | Bent County | 38°03′53″N 103°12′57″W | 5.1 | Reciprocating engine (x5) | 1941/1951/1967 | |

== Renewable power stations ==
Data from the U.S. Energy Information Administration serves as a general reference.

=== Biomass ===
| Name | Location | Coordinates | Capacity (MW) | Fuel | Generation type | Year completed | Refs |
|---|---|---|---|---|---|---|---|
| DADS Gas Recovery | Arapahoe County | 39°39′08″N 104°42′58″W | 2.8 | Landfill gas | Reciprocating engine (x4) | 2008 | |
| Eagle Valley Clean Energy | Eagle County | 39°38′53″N 106°56′35″W | 12.6 | Wood/wood waste | Steam turbine | 2013 | |
| Front Range Project | Weld County | 40°01′46″N 105°00′17″W | 3.1 | Landfill gas | Reciprocating engine (x1) | 2011 | |
| Metro Wastewater Reclamation | Denver County | 39°48′28″N 104°57′15″W | 9.8 | Biogas | Reciprocating engine (x4); Single cycle (x2) | 1985; 2000 | |

=== Hydroelectric ===
Note: This list excludes Colorado's pumped-storage hydroelectric facilities (see Pumped storage).

| Name | Location | Coordinates | Capacity (MW) | Year completed | Refs |
|---|---|---|---|---|---|
| Morrow Point Power Plant | Montrose County | 38°27′07″N 107°32′17″W | 173.3 | 1968 | |
| Flatiron Power Plant | Larimer County | 40°21′54″N 105°14′10″W | 94.5 | 1954 | |
| Blue Mesa Power Plant | Gunnison County | 38°27′12″N 107°20′04″W | 86.4 | 1966 | |
| Estes Power Plant | Larimer County | 40°22′36″N 105°30′35″W | 45 | 1950 | |
| Pole Hill Power Plant | Larimer County | 40°21′54″N 105°19′30″W | 38.2 | 1954 | |
| Crystal Power Plant | Montrose County | 38°30′38″N 107°37′31″W | 31.5 | 1977 | |
| Tesla Hydro Power Plant | El Paso County | 38°58′25″N 104°54′04″W | 28 | 1997 | |
| Green Mountain Powerplant | Summit County | 39°52′44″N 106°19′58″W | 26 | 1943 | |
| Shoshone Generating Station | Garfield County | 39°34′12″N 107°13′37″W | 15 | 1909 | |
| Towaoc Powerplant | Montezuma County | 37°25′46″N 108°34′30″W | 11.5 | 1993 | |
| Upper Molina Powerplant | Mesa County | 39°08′38″N 108°00′17″W | 8.6 | 1962 | |
| Marys Lake Power Plant | Larimer County | 40°20′39″N 105°32′04″W | 8.1 | 1951 | |
| Ridgway Dam Hydropower Project | Ouray County | 38°14′21″N 107°45′29″W | 8 | 2014 | |
| Gross Hydro Plant | Boulder County | 39°56′44″N 105°21′23″W | 7.8 | 1954 | |
| James W. Broderick Hydro Plant | Pueblo County | 38°15′18″N 104°43′55″W | 7.5 | 2019 | |
| Manitou Hydro Power Plant | El Paso County | 38°51′20″N 104°55′59″W | 5 | 1905 | |
| Ruedi Power Plant | Pitkin County | 39°21′47″N 106°49′19″W | 5 | 1985 | |
| Vinelands Power Plant | Mesa County | 39°06′05″N 108°20′49″W | 4.9 | 2022 | |
| Lower Molina Powerplant | Mesa County | 39°11′44″N 108°02′56″W | 4.8 | 1962 | |
| Tacoma Power Plant | La Plata County | 37°31′25″N 107°46′58″W | 4.6 | 1906 | |
| Ames Hydroelectric Generating Plant | San Miguel County | 37°51′58″N 107°52′59″W | 3.8 | 1906 | |
| Carter Lake Hydroelectric Project | Larimer County | 40°19′27″N 105°12′32″W | 2.6 | 2012 | |
| Taylor Draw Hydroelectric Facility | Rio Blanco County | 40°06′23″N 108°42′40″W | 2.3 | 1993 | |
| Georgetown Hydro Generating Plant | Clear Creek County | 39°41′31″N 105°41′52″W | 1.6 | 1903 | |
| McPhee Dam Powerplant | Montezuma County | 37°34′39″N 108°34′20″W | 1.3 | 1992 | |
| Strontia Springs Hydro Plant | Douglas County | 39°25′57″N 105°07′34″W | 1 | 1986 | |
| Ouray Hydroelectric Power Plant | Ouray County | 38°01′14″N 107°40′30″W | 0.90 | 1890 | |
| Smuggler-Union Hydro Power Plant | San Miguel County | 37°55′09″N 107°46′08″W | 0.50 | 1907 | |

=== Wind farms ===
| Name | Location | Coordinates | Capacity (MW) | Year completed | Refs |
|---|---|---|---|---|---|
| Limon Wind Energy Center | Lincoln County | 39°22′51″N 103°34′23″W | 601 | 2014 | |
| Rush Creek Wind Project | Elbert County | 39°10′20″N 103°50′43″W | 600 | 2018 | |
| Cedar Creek Wind Farm | Weld County | 40°52′16″N 104°05′35″W | 551 | 2011 | |
| Cheyenne Ridge Wind Farm | Lincoln County | 38°58′00″N 102°21′00″W | 498.4 | 2020 | |
| Peetz Table Wind Complex | Logan County | 40°57′03″N 103°09′19″W | 430 | 2007 | |
| Bronco Plains Wind | Kit Carson County | 39°5′20″N 103°1′30″W | 300 | 2020 | |
| Cedar Point Wind Farm | Lincoln County | 39°25′18″N 103°40′41″W | 252 | 2011 | |
| Golden West Wind Energy Center | El Paso County | 38°56′06″N 104°12′43″W | 250 | 2015 | |
| Heritage Dairy Wind Farm | Yuma County | 40°02′06″N 102°43′01″W | 250 | 2016 | |
| Northern Colorado Wind Energy Center | Logan County | 40°59′17″N 102°53′49″W | 174 | 2009 | |
| Mountain Breeze Wind | Weld County | 40°57′38″N 104°0′12″W | 171 | 2021 | |
| Colorado Green Wind Power Project | Prowers County | 37°42′12″N 102°37′23″W | 162 | 2003 | |
| Carousel Wind Energy Center | Kit Carson County | 39°20′02″N 102°10′23″W | 150 | 2015 | |
| Spring Canyon Wind Farm | Logan County | 40°58′59″N 102°57′53″W | 123 | 2014 | |
| Crossing Trails Wind Farm | Kit Carson County | 39°02′48″N 102°49′21″W | 104 | 2021 | |
| Colorado Highlands Wind Farm | Logan County | 40°45′25″N 102°44′35″W | 91 | 2013 | |
| Twin Buttes Wind Project | Bent County | 37°40′25″N 102°51′44″W | 75 | 2007 | |
| Twin Buttes Wind II Project | Prowers County | 37°46′23″N 102°32′46″W | 75 | 2018 | |
| Peak View Wind Farm | Huerfano County | 37°42′38″N 104°30′20″W | 61 | 2017 | |
| Busch Ranch II Wind Project | Huerfano and Las Animas counties | 37°45′33″N 104°26′54″W | 59 | 2019 | |
| Kit Carson Wind Farm | Kit Carson County | 39°20′18″N 102°21′12″W | 51 | 2017 | |
| Huerfano River Wind Farm | Huerfano County | 37°46′28″N 104°49′55″W | 8 | 2013 | |

=== Solar farms ===
| Name | Location | Coordinates | Capacity (MW_{AC}) | Year completed | Refs |
|---|---|---|---|---|---|
| Bighorn Solar Project | Pueblo County | 38°13′3″N 104°34′48″W | 240 | 2022 | |
| Sun Mountain Solar 1 | Pueblo County | 38°10′49″N 104°31′7″W | 200 | 2022 | |
| Comanche Solar Project | Pueblo County | 38°12′19″N 104°34′00″W | 120 | 2016 | |
| Palmer Solar Project | El Paso County | 38°38′10″N 104°39′37″W | 60 | 2020 | |
| Hooper Solar PV Power Plant | Alamosa County | 37°41′32″N 105°58′54″W | 50 | 2015 | |
| Grazing Yak Solar Project | El Paso County | 38°58′35″N 104°14′55″W | 35 | 2019 | |
| Rawhide Flats Bison Solar Plant | Larimer County | 40°51′38″N 105°00′38″W | 30 | 2016 | |
| San Isabel Solar Energy Center | Las Animas County | 37°22′03″N 104°28′04″W | 30 | 2016 | |
| Alamosa Solar Generating Project | Alamosa County | 37°35′54″N 105°57′07″W | 30 | 2012 | |
| San Luis Valley Solar Ranch | Alamosa County | 37°41′03″N 105°53′13″W | 30 | 2011 | |
| Greater Sandhill Solar Plant | Alamosa County | 37°41′08″N 105°53′27″W | 19 | 2010 | |
| SR Platte Rattlesnake Solar Farm | Weld County | 40°10′54″N 104°41′31″W | 16 | 2017 | |
| SR Fort Lupton Solar Farm | Weld County | 40°04′53″N 104°44′48″W | 13 | 2016 | |
| Victory Solar Facility | Adams County | 39°47′42″N 104°25′59″W | 13 | 2016 | |
| Clear Spring Ranch Solar Array | El Paso County | 38°36′08″N 104°41′41″W | 10 | 2016 | |
| Denver Int'l Airport Solar Project | Denver County | 39°54′00″N 104°40′24″W | 8.3 | 2014 | 10MWDC |
| Alamosa Photovoltaic Power Plant | Alamosa County | 37°41′25″N 105°52′40″W | 7.7 | 2007 | |
| SR Mavericks Solar Farm | Weld County | 40°13′48″N 105°01′48″W | 6.5 | 2016 | |
| SR Skylark Solar Farm (A&B) | Weld County | 40°34′40″N 104°53′41″W | 6 | 2016 | |
| Air Force Academy Solar Farm | El Paso County | 38°57′24″N 104°48′23″W | 5.5 | 2011 | |
| Colorado State Univ. Solar Farm | Larimer County | 40°35′32″N 105°08′50″W | 5 | 2010 | |
| Valley View Solar Farm | Weld County | 40°25′08″N 104°53′31″W | 4 | 2015 | |
| SR Kersey Platte Valley Solar Farm | Weld County | 40°23′10″N 104°33′03″W | 3.5 | 2017 | |
| Fort Carson Army Base Solar Farm | El Paso County | 38°41′15″N 104°46′55″W | 2 | 2010 | |
| Rifle Energy Innovation Plant | Garfield County | 39°31′23″N 107°48′48″W | 2 | 2009 | |
| Garfield Airport Solar Array | Garfield County | 39°31′29″N 107°40′20″W | 0.858 | | |
| CRMS Solar Farm | Garfield County | 39°24′36″N 107°13′32″W | 0.147 | | |

== Storage power stations ==
=== Battery storage ===
| Name | Location | Coordinates | Discharge capacity (MW) | Year completed | Refs |
|---|---|---|---|---|---|
| Fort Carson BESS | El Paso County | 38°44′44″N 104°46′40″W | 4.2 | 2018 | |
| I-25 Battery Storage | Weld County | 40°08′25″N 104°58′41″W | 4.0 | 2018 | |
| DOE Golden NWTC Hybrid | Jefferson County | 39°54′50″N 105°12′55″W | 1.3 | 2019 | |
| Panasonic Carport Solar Hybrid | Adams County | 39°48′31″N 104°46′53″W | 1.0 | 2017 | |

=== Pumped storage ===
| Name | Location | Coordinates | Capacity (MW) | Year completed | Refs |
|---|---|---|---|---|---|
| Cabin Creek Generating Station | Clear Creek County | 39°39′19″N 105°42′32″W | 324 | 1967 | |
| Mount Elbert Powerplant | Lake County | 39°05′39″N 106°21′08″W | 200 | 1981 | |
| Flatiron Power Plant | Larimer County | 40°21′54″N 105°14′10″W | 8.5 | 1954 | |

== See also ==
- Bibliography of Colorado
- Geography of Colorado
- History of Colorado
- Index of Colorado-related articles
- List of Colorado-related lists
- Outline of Colorado
