= Bison Solar Plant =

Power plant in Colorado, USA

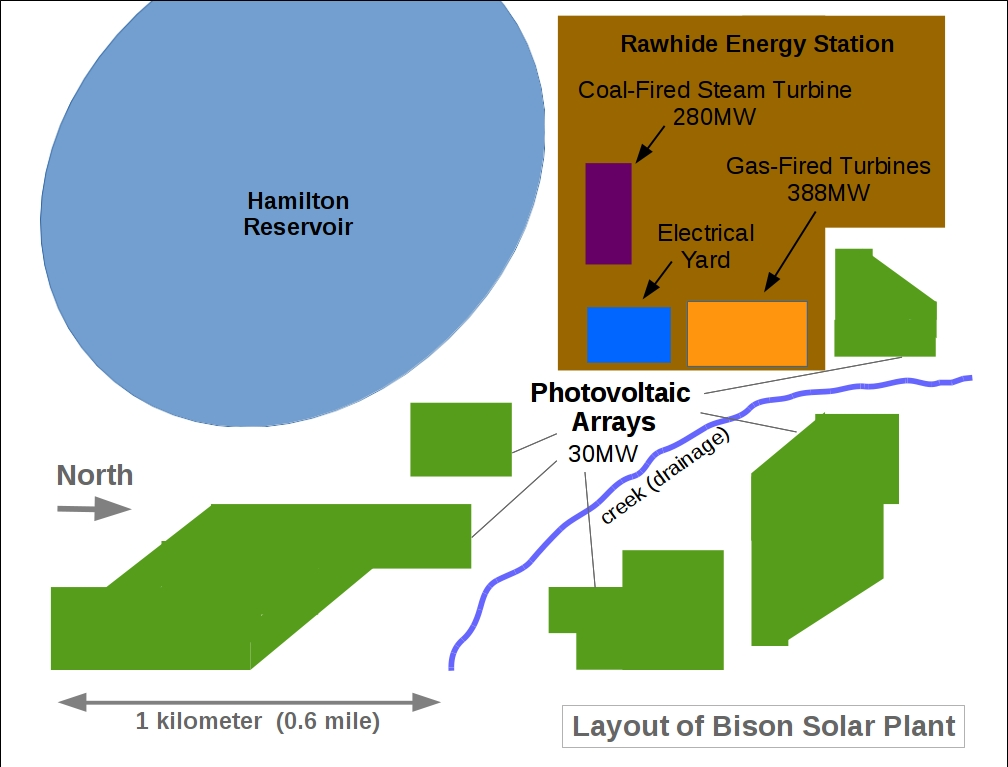
- The general layout of the facility
- Country: United States
- Location: Larimer County, Colorado
- Coordinates: 40°51′38″N 105°00′38″W
- Status: Operational
- Construction began: February 2016
- Commission date: October 2016
- Construction cost: US$54 million
- Owner: PSEG Solar Source
- Operators: juwi O&M Group

Solar farm
- Type: Flat-panel PV
- Site area: 190 acres (77 ha)

Power generation
- Nameplate capacity: 36.3 MW_{p}, 30 MW_{AC}
- Capacity factor: 23.4% (average 2017-2019)
- Annual net output: 61.6 GW·h, 324 MW·h/acre

The Bison Solar Plant, also known as the Rawhide Flats Solar Plant, is a 30 megawatt (MW_{AC}) photovoltaic power station in Larimer County, Colorado located about 10 miles (16 km) north of the town of Wellington. The plant is notable for being one of the first in the U.S. built to a 1500 Volt system specification. The electricity is being sold to the Platte River Power Authority (PRPA) under a 25-year power purchase agreement.

== Facility details ==
The plant occupies about 190 acres (77 ha) distributed adjacent to PRPA's natural gas and coal-fired Rawhide Energy Station. It uses 117,120 polycrystalline silicon panels (Model SN-72cell: rated ~310 W_{p}, ~16% efficiency, 1500 V_{dc} isolation) that the manufacturer, S-Energy, claims are less susceptible to potential-induced degradation. The panels are mounted in rows onto single-axis trackers. The rows are organized into 12 blocks, and the electricity produced from each block is connected to the electric grid through a Samurai Series 1500 V_{dc}, 2700 kW / 2700 kVA inverter built by TMEIC. The boost in system voltage from the previous 1.0 kV standard to 1.5 kV enables the inverter to operate at higher efficiency and reliability, and is expected to reduce overall balance of system costs over the lifetime of the facility.

The project was developed, constructed, and continues to be operated by Boulder-based juwi Inc., the U.S. subsidiary of the German renewable energy company juwi AG. Construction began in February 2016, and commercial operation began in October 2016. The project was financed and is owned by PSEG Solar Source, a subsidiary of New Jersey's Public Service Enterprise Group. The completed facility cost about US$54 million.

On February 14, 2019 PRPA announced that it entered an agreement to add another 20 MW of solar photovoltaic generating capacity at the site, anticipated to be online in early 2020. The addition will include 2 MW of lithium-ion battery storage.

== Electricity production ==
Generation (MW·h) of Bison Solar
Year	Jan	Feb	Mar	Apr	May	Jun	Jul	Aug	Sep	Oct	Nov	Dec	Total
2016										5,290	3,506	2,509	11,305
2017	2,377	3,703	5,180	5,718	6,741	7,306	6,337	5,303	4,442	5,260	3,356	3,445	59,168
2018	3,339	3,926	5,077	6,153	7,090	7,620	6,641	6,631	6,373	4,752	3,917	2,836	64,356
2019	3,187	3,358	5,002	5,880	6,270	7,052	6,675	6,795	5,609	5,514	3,427	2,498	61,276
Average Annual Production (years 2017-2019) --->													61,600

== See also ==
- Comanche Solar Project
- Solar power in Colorado
- Solar power in the United States
- Renewable energy in the United States
- Renewable portfolio standard
