= Avenal =

Avenal may refer to:

- Avenal, California, United States, a city
  - Avenal Solar Facility
  - Avenal State Prison, a men's prison
- Avenal, New Zealand, a suburb of the city of Invercargill
- Avenal McKinnon (1949–2021), New Zealand art historian and writer
- Richmond Avenal, character from the British sitcom The IT Crowd

== See also ==
- USS West Avenal, a World War I cargo ship
