= San Isabel Solar Energy Center =

Photovoltaic power station in Colorado

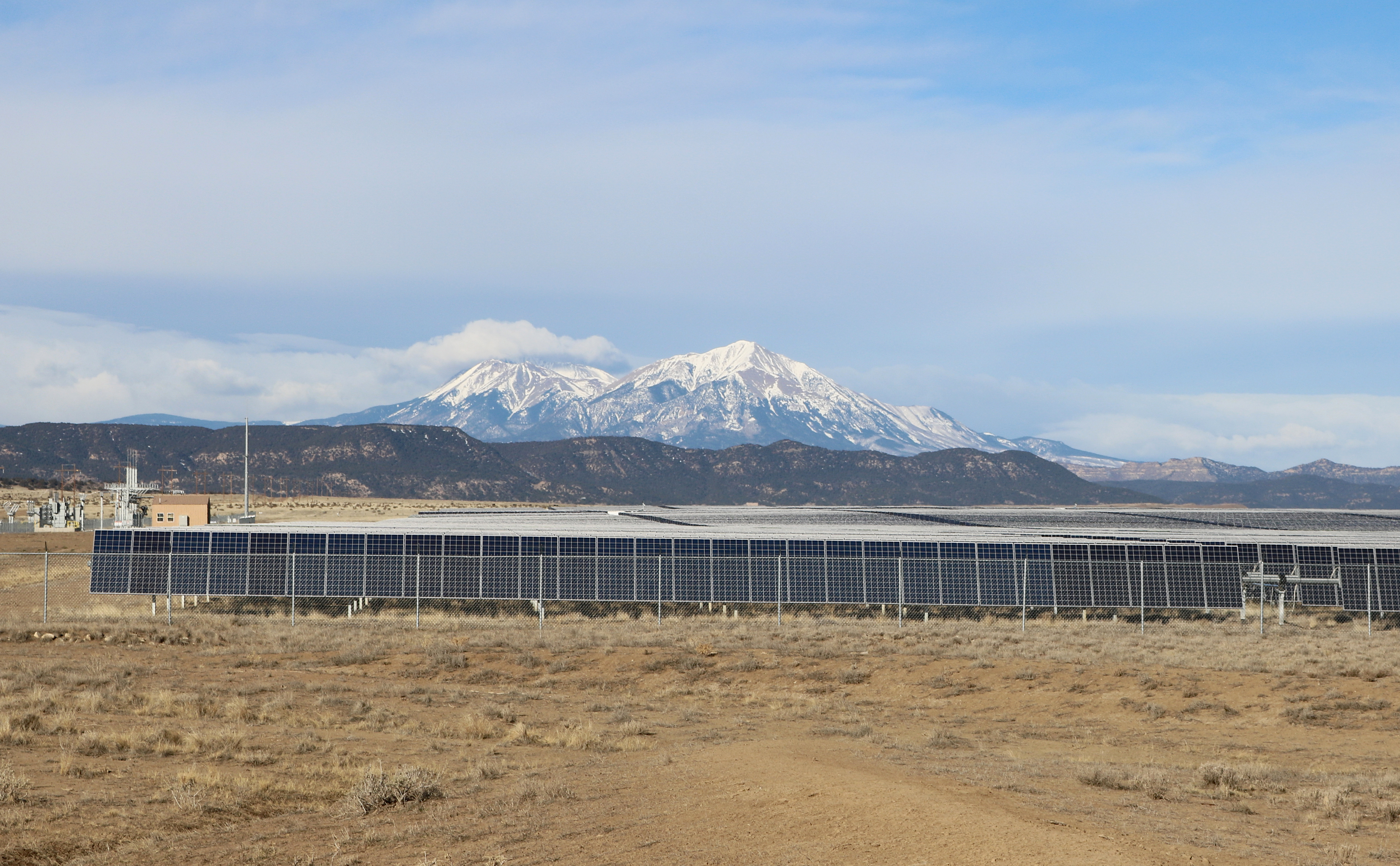
- A view of the project with the Spanish Peaks in the distance.
- Country: United States
- Location: Las Animas County, Colorado
- Coordinates: 37°22′03″N 104°28′04″W
- Status: Operational
- Construction began: March 2016
- Commission date: December 2016
- Construction cost: US$60 million
- Owner: PSEG Solar Source
- Operators: juwi O&M Group

Solar farm
- Type: Flat-panel PV single-axis tracking
- Site area: 250 acres (101 ha)

Power generation
- Nameplate capacity: 37.9 MW_{p}, 30 MW_{AC}
- Capacity factor: 27.4 (average 2017-2019)
- Annual net output: 72.0 GW·h, 288 MW·h/acre

The San Isabel Solar Energy Center is a 30 megawatt (MW_{AC}) photovoltaic power station in Las Animas County, Colorado located about 20 miles north of the city of Trinidad. The electricity is being sold to Tri-State Generation and Transmission (aka Tri-State) under a 25-year power purchase agreement. It is the second solar project, following the Cimarron Solar Facility in year 2010, to be added to the utility cooperative's renewables portfolio.

== Project details ==
The facility occupies about 250 acres of semi-arid shortgrass prairie on the Colorado south-eastern plains, about 10 miles east of the base of the Rocky Mountains. It uses 120,960 polycrystalline silicon panels (Model SN-72cell: rated 310 W_{p}, ~16% efficiency) that the manufacturer, S-Energy, claims are less susceptible to potential-induced degradation. The panels are mounted in rows onto single-axis trackers to optimize electricity production throughout the day.

The project was developed, constructed, and continues to be operated by Boulder-based juwi Inc., the U.S. subsidiary of the German renewable energy company juwi AG. Construction began in March 2016 and employed about 400 workers, with Nesco serving as contractor for the civil structures. Commercial operation began in December 2016, with a dedication ceremony on July 14, 2017. The project was financed, and is owned by PSEG Solar Source, a subsidiary of New Jersey's Public Service Enterprise Group. The completed facility cost about US$60 million.

On January 11, 2019 Tri-State and juwi announced their development plan for the 100 MW Spanish Peaks Solar Project, which would be sited adjacent to San Isabel Solar Energy Center. Under their plan, juwi will continue to develop the project and Tri-State would buy the electricity under a 15-year contract. A construction start is being targeted for year 2022, with completion in 2023. If funded, it may be the fourth solar project, following the Alta Luna Solar Facility in 2017, to be added to Tri-State's renewables portfolio.

== Electricity production ==
Generation (MW·h) of San Isabel
Year	Jan	Feb	Mar	Apr	May	Jun	Jul	Aug	Sep	Oct	Nov	Dec	Total
2016												4,287	4,287
2017	2,678	4,172	5,837	6,443	7,596	8,232	7,140	5,975	5,005	5,927	3,781	3,882	66,668
2018	4,262	5,251	7,453	7,157	7,785	8,406	7,710	7,526	6,795	4,630	4,398	4,044	75,417
2019	4,326	5,451	6,380	6,596	7,396	7,830	8,006	7,685	7,433	5,556	3,940	3,452	74,051
2020	4,553	4,415	7,081	7,437	8,465	7,871	7,489	7,738					
Average Annual Production (years 2017-2019) :													72,045
Average Capacity Factor (years 2017-2019) :													27.4%

== See also ==
- Comanche Solar Project
- Solar power in Colorado
- Solar power in the United States
- Renewable energy in the United States
- Renewable portfolio standard
