= PRPA =

PRPA may refer to:

- Branka Prpa (born 1953), Serbian historian
- Luka Prpa (born 1998), American soccer player
- Philadelphia Regional Port Authority
- Prince Rupert Port Authority
- Puerto Rico Ports Authority
- Platte River Power Authority, see Bison Solar Plant
