= Big Star Solar Project =

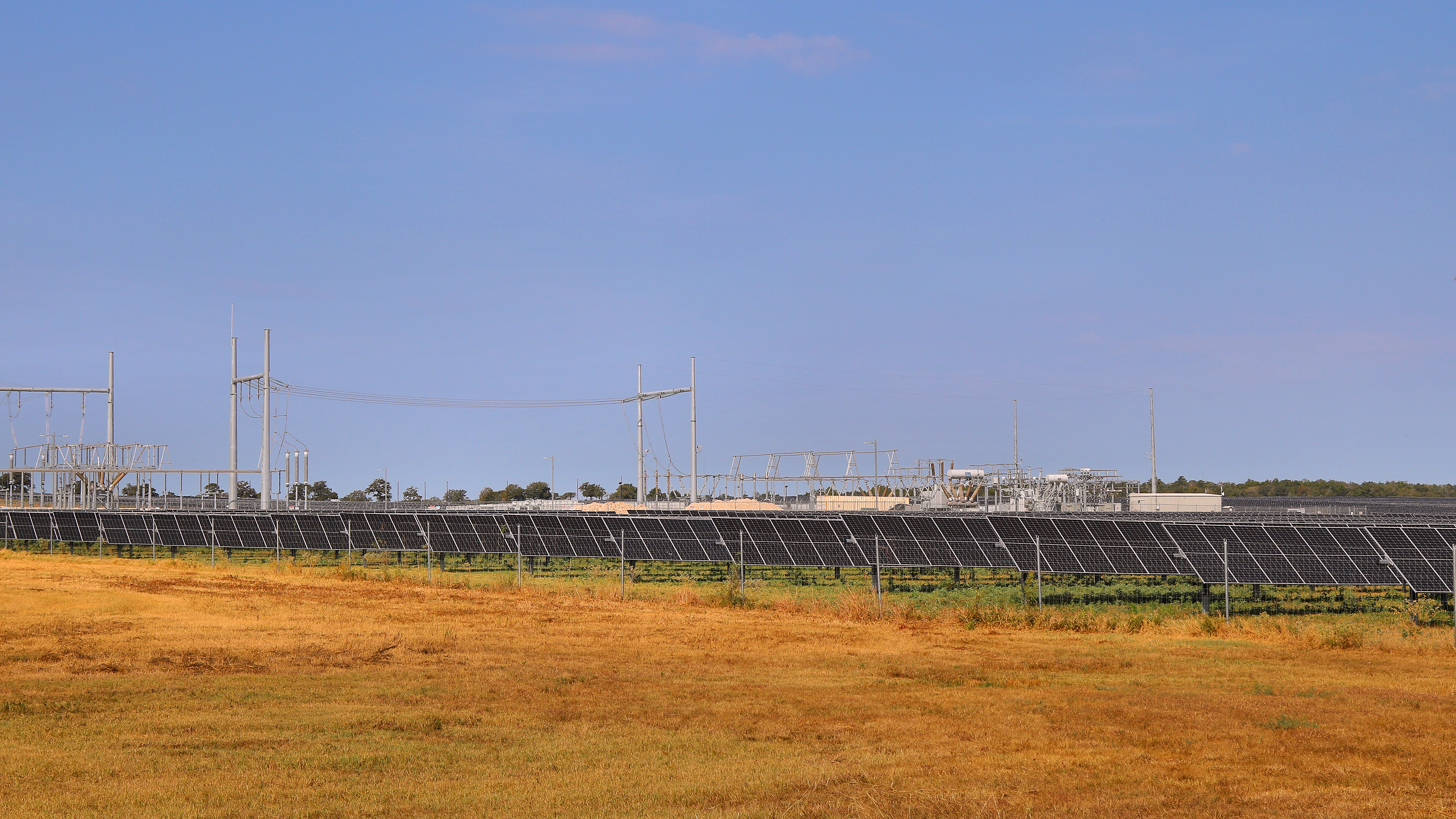
- Country: United States
- Coordinates: 29°54′50.1″N 97°17′23.3″W
- Status: Commissioned
- Construction began: June 2021
- Commission date: March 2024
- Owner: RWE
- Operator: RWE Renewables Americas LLC

Solar farm
- Type: Flat-panel PV
- Solar tracker: single-axis tracking system
- Site area: 2,500 acres

Power generation
- Storage capacity: 80 megawatts

The Big Star Solar Project is a photovoltaic array and storage project located outside of Rosanky, Texas, in southern Bastrop County, Texas.

== History ==
The development of the Big Star Solar Project is a part of Texas's broader strategy to diversify its energy sources and reduce its carbon footprint. Traditionally known for its oil and gas industry, but over the last decade, the state has also emerged as a leader in renewable energy, particularly as the construction of wind and solar power projects have taken off.

=== Planning, Development & Construction ===
The project was initiated in the mid-2010s by German multinational energy company RWE, as part of a larger wave of solar farm development in the state. Solar projects like Blue Star have gained momentum in Texas after the passage of the Texas Renewable Energy Portfolio Standard (REPS), and the falling costs of solar technology, making it more financially viable for both private and public investors.

Initial permits for the project were approved in 2019, with construction beginning soon after. The project was designed to be a utility-scale solar farm capable of generating hundreds of megawatts (MW) of electricity, enough to power tens of thousands of homes.

The construction phase of the Big Star Solar Project involved the installation of tens of thousands of solar panels across a 2,500-acre stretch of land in Bastrop County. The project employed local workers and provided a temporary economic boost to the area during its construction phase.

The Big Star Solar Project began commercial operation in 2021. It generates approximately 200 MW of electricity, which is enough to power approximately 35,000 homes. The project's electricity is sold to utilities and private customers under long-term power purchase agreements (PPAs).

=== Opposition ===
Despite its benefits, the Big Star Solar Project has faced significant opposition from certain local groups and residents of Bastrop County. The opposition primarily from the local Rosanky community, centers on the "Corporate Welfare", land use and zoning, environmental concerns, aesthetic & visual impact and energy dependence.

One of the most vocal objections have come from local residents, who are concerned about the use of large tracts of land for solar farms, especially in a region traditionally known for its agricultural and residential communities. Some have argued that solar farms could displace farming activities and/or lower property values, especially for those with adjacent land. Other local residents have expressed concern about the visual aesthetics of the solar panels, especially considering the size of the installation. They argue that the large, industrial-scale solar farm could detract from the natural beauty and rural character of the area.

== Electricity Production ==
- Capacity: 200 MW (megawatts)
- Annual Output: Approximately 450,000 MWh (megawatt-hours) of electricity, enough to power about 35,000 homes per year.
