= Comanche Solar Project =

Photovoltaic power station

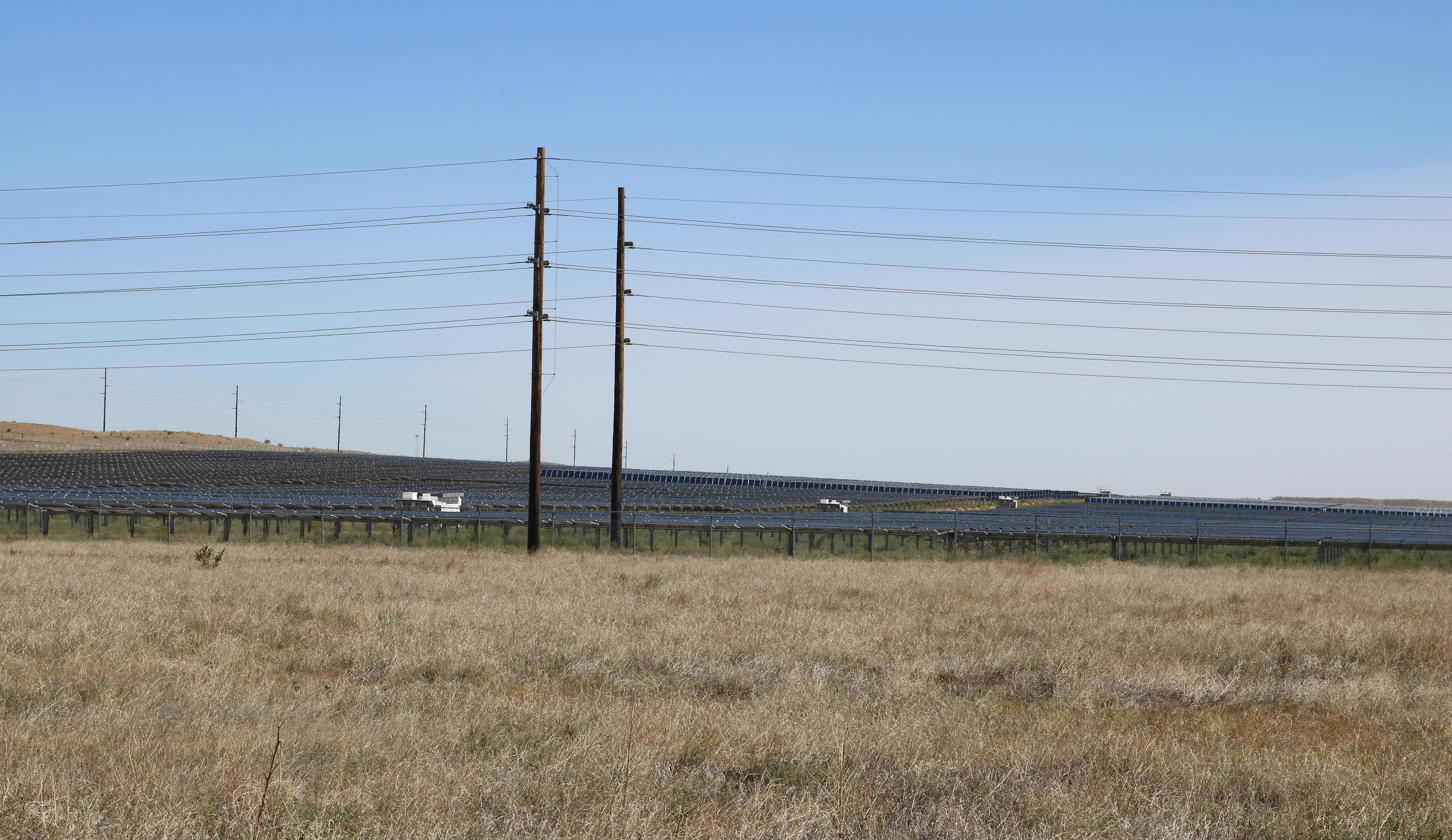
- A view of an array looking east from Lime Road.
- Country: United States
- Location: Pueblo, Colorado
- Coordinates: 38°12′19″N 104°34′00″W
- Status: Operational
- Construction began: August 2015
- Commission date: September 2016
- Construction cost: $253 million
- Owner: Novatus Energy
- Operator: Swinerton Renewable Energy

Solar farm
- Type: Flat-panel PV single-axis tracking
- Site area: 900 acres (364 ha)

Power generation
- Nameplate capacity: 156 MW_{p}, 120 MW_{AC}
- Capacity factor: 27.7% (average 2017-2020)
- Annual net output: 291 GW·h, 323 MW·h/acre

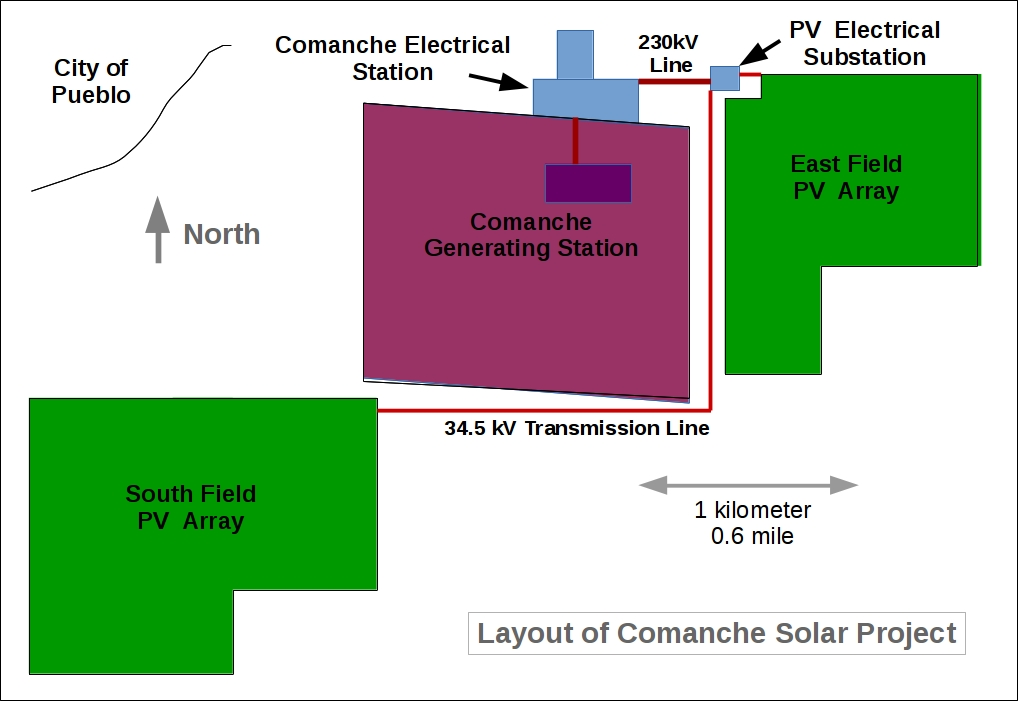
Layout of the facility.

The Comanche Solar Project is a 120 megawatt (MW_{AC}) photovoltaic power station near the city of Pueblo, Colorado. It became the largest solar facility in the state when it came online in late 2016. The electricity is being sold to Public Service of Colorado, a subsidiary of Xcel Energy, under a 25-year power purchase agreement (PPA). Xcel determined through an open bid process that the PPA's terms were competitive with natural gas.

== Construction details ==
The project occupies a total of about 900 acres split into two parcels that are adjacent to the coal-fired Comanche Generating Station; thus providing access to existing high-capacity substation and transmission infrastructure. It uses 502,056 Trina Solar polycrystalline silicon panels that are mounted in rows and onto single-axis trackers. The rows are organized into 75 blocks, and the electricity produced from each block is connected to the electric grid through an inverter built by TMEIC.

In early 2015, SunEdison awarded an EPC contract for the project to Renewable Energy Systems (RES) of Broomfield. Work at the site began in August and proceeded through the winter months, with most balance of system (BOS) construction activities completed by April 2016. The panel installation, electrical integration, and acceptance testing proceeded through the summer, enabling the start of commercial operations in September. The completed facility is operated and maintained by Swinerton Renewable Energy.

== Development and ownership history ==
The project was originated by Community Energy, which completed many of the initial negotiations such as the grid integration strategy, land leases, and required permits. SunEdison announced its acquisition of the project in July 2014 concurrent with the results of Xcel's open solicitation/competitive bid process. In August, SunEdison announced its strategy to finance the $253 million Comanche project using a novel special purpose vehicle named "First Reserve". As designed with its partner Everstream Capital Management, this funding mechanism - a special type of warehouse - would expand to meet demand from new investors as Comanche (and future projects) moved into construction, thus reducing the need for incremental equity contributions by SunEdison while preserving a first right of call provision for its TerraForm Power yield co.

With all requirements in place, the start of construction was announced in August 2015. Most BOS work was complete by the time that SunEdison filed for Chapter 11 bankruptcy protection on April 21, 2016. Nevertheless, work at Comanche and other SunEdison projects continued unabated due to the company's receipt of $300 million in bankruptcy debt financing. On May 16, 2017 Novatus Energy announced its purchase of the operating Comanche facility, although terms were not disclosed.

== Electricity production ==
Generation (MW·h) of Comanche Solar
Year	Jan	Feb	Mar	Apr	May	Jun	Jul	Aug	Sep	Oct	Nov	Dec	Total
2016									29,335	23,889	17,647	13,721	84,592
2017	11,466	17,862	24,991	27,586	32,522	35,245	30,570	25,582	21,429	25,376	16,188	16,621	285,438
2018	15,452	18,172	23,498	28,477	32,816	35,266	30,739	30,690	29,497	21,995	18,131	13,127	297,860
2019	15,125	15,937	23,742	27,950	29,756	33,470	31,681	32,251	26,622	26,168	16,264	11,855	290,821
2020	16,771	17,112	26,628	28,533	33,986	32,285	31,235	29,451	26,492	19,131	16,898	12,209	290,731
2021	13,370	11,618	18,124	21,098	21,311	29,678	33,758	30,274					
Average Annual Production (years 2017-2020) --->													291,122

== See also ==
- Solar power in Colorado
- List of power stations in Colorado
- San Isabel Solar Energy Center
- Renewable portfolio standard
