= Huerfano River Wind Farm =

Wind farm in Colorado, United States

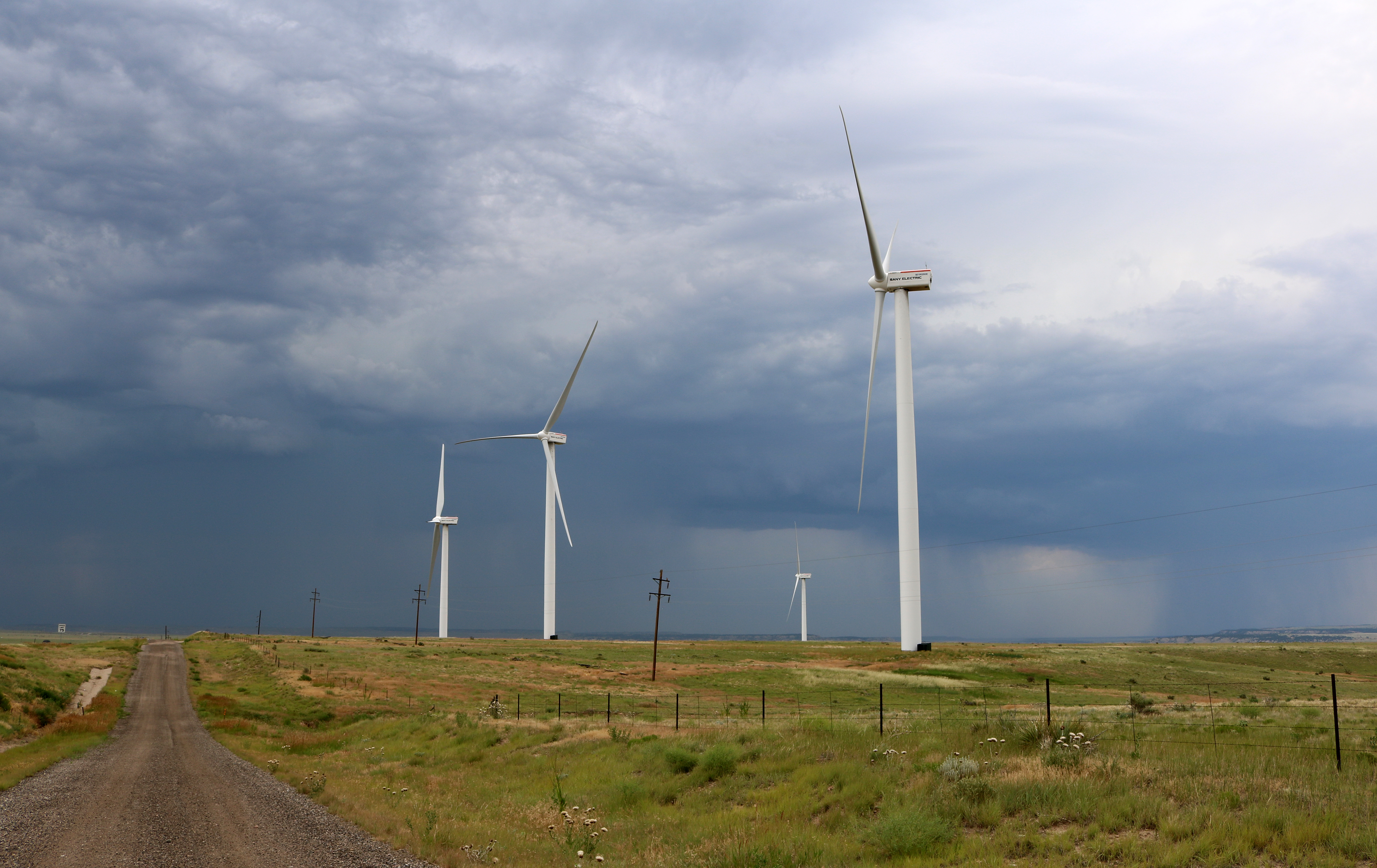
- The wind farm in 2017
- Country: United States
- Location: Walsenburg, Colorado, United States
- Coordinates: 37°46′27.6″N 104°49′54.9″W
- Status: Operational
- Commission date: 2013
- Owner: Tamra-Tacoma Capital Partners

Wind farm
- Type: commercial
- Hub height: 80m
- Rotor diameter: 102m

Power generation
- Units operational: 4
- Make and model: Sany
- Nameplate capacity: 8 MW

The Huerfano River Wind Farm is a producer of distributed generation (DG) power located ten miles north of Walsenburg, just off of Interstate 25.

The farm uses four Sany-made 2MW turbines and feeds into the San Isabel Electric Association grid. The farm was named in the U.S. Department of Energy 2014 Wind Cooperative of the Year and also honored Pueblo West-based San Isabel Electric Association for its efforts in developing the Huerfano River Wind Project and other wind energy initiatives.

The farm was owned by Shane Starr and Matthew Brown of Tamra-Tacoma Capital Partners ("TTCP"), a New York-based investment firm. TTCP initiated litigation against Sany America on August 31, 2016, alleging Sany fraudulently misrepresented the plant's production and had no maintenance program, leaving the asset "worthless" according to the complaint. The judge ruled that the defendant's (Sany's) counterclaims "weren’t worth a tinker’s damn.” On February 6, 2019, the case was settled and subsequently dismissed with prejudice.

== See also ==
- Wind power in Colorado
- List of onshore wind farms
