= Rush Creek Wind Project =

Wind farm in Colorado, USA

- Country: United States
- Location: Limon, Colorado
- Coordinates: 39°10′20″N 103°50′43″W
- Status: Operational
- Construction began: June 2017
- Commission date: December 2018
- Construction cost: $1 billion
- Owner: Xcel Energy
- Operator: Xcel Energy

Wind farm
- Type: Onshore
- Hub height: 80 m
- Rotor diameter: 110 m

Power generation
- Units operational: 300 Vestas turbines
- Make and model: V110/2000 (2.0MW)
- Nameplate capacity: 600 MW
- Capacity factor: 38.9% (average 2019-2021)
- Annual net output: 2,043 GW·h

The Rush Creek Wind Project is a 600 megawatt (MW) wind facility in eastern Colorado, located west of the town of Limon. It increased the wind generating capacity in the state by 20% when it came online in late 2018. The facility is financed, owned, and operated by Xcel Energy, the largest public utility in the state. The project was developed primarily for its numerous economic benefits since Xcel previously met the minimum 30% requirement of Colorado's 2020 renewable portfolio standard.

== Facility details ==
The facility consists of two wind farms that occupy 95,000 acres of leased private land. The largest grouping of turbines is within Elbert County near the community of Matheson and located about 60 miles southeast of Denver. A smaller grouping of turbines is located 35 miles east and spans the intersections of Cheyenne, Kit Carson, and Lincoln County near the town of Hugo. 83 miles of new 345 kV overhead transmission line carry the electricity to the Xcel Energy substation near Deer Trail in Arapahoe County.

Most components for the 300 Vestas 2.0 MW turbines were produced at the four nearby manufacturing facilities in Pueblo, Brighton, and Windsor, Colorado, which together employ about 3,500 people. Overall, it is estimated that each turbine supports about 30 jobs over the course of its lifetime through its manufacturing, supply chain, construction, and operation. The facility is also expected to generate $180 million in landowner lease payments and property tax revenues in the counties where it resides.

Xcel Energy contracted Invenergy to lead the development and asset management of the facility through the construction phase. Mortenson Construction served as the EPC contractor for the project. Construction began in June 2017 and completed in December 2018, employing about 350 workers. The facility consists of 300 turbines, two substations, maintenance building, access roads, and transmission lines. About 34 permanent jobs were also created to maintain the facility, and Xcel has partnered with the Vestas operations group to assist with maximizing the electricity production. It is expected to generate enough electricity to meet the needs of about 325,000 Colorado homes.

== Electricity production ==
Rush Creek Wind Electricity Generation (MW·h)
Year	Total Annual MW·h
2018	194,543*
2019	1,975,124
2020	2,024,321
2021	2,128,334
Average (years 2019-2021) --->	2,042,593

(*) partial year of operation

== See also ==
- Wind power in Colorado
- Environmental impact of wind power
- List of wind farms in the United States
