= Limon Wind Energy Center =

Wind farm in Colorado, USA

- Country: United States
- Location: Limon, Colorado
- Coordinates: 39°22′51″N 103°34′23″W
- Status: Operational
- Commission date: 2012 (Limon I&II), 2014 (Limon III)
- Owner: NextEra Energy Resources
- Operator: NextEra Energy Resources

Wind farm
- Type: Onshore
- Rotor diameter: 100 m

Power generation
- Units operational: 368 General Electric turbines
- Make and model: GE 1.6 MW (Limon I&II), GE 1.7 MW (Limon III)
- Nameplate capacity: 600.6 MW
- Capacity factor: 39.4% (average 2015-2021)
- Annual net output: 2,073 GW·h

The Limon Wind Energy Center is a 600.6 megawatt (MW) wind farm in eastern Colorado near the town of Limon. It became the largest wind facility in the state when construction completed in 2014. The electricity is being sold to Xcel Energy under long-term power purchase agreements.

== Facility details ==
The facility is located about 80 miles east of Denver. It was constructed in three phases, and extends across western Lincoln County and crosses a few miles into Elbert County. About 45 miles (72 km) of 345 kV transmission line connect the wind farm substations to the Xcel Energy substation near Deer Trail in Arapahoe County.

Limon I and Limon II were constructed by Blattner Energy, and came on line in late 2012. The 400 MW facility consists of twin 200 MW projects, each using 125 – GE 1.6 MW wind turbines that occupy more than 55,000 acres. Two new substations were also constructed.

Limon III came into service in 2014 with an additional 200 MW of capacity. It consists of 118 – GE 1.7 MW wind turbines occupying over 49,600 acres. An approximately ten mile, 345 kV transmission line connects the Limon III substation to the Limon II substation.

NextEra Energy Resources developed and financed, and continues to own and operate the facility.

== Electricity production ==
Limon Wind Energy Center Generation (MW·h)
Year	Limon I (200 MW Unit)	Limon II (200 MW Unit)	Limon III (200.6 MW Unit)	Total Annual MW·h
2012	125,797*	77,870*		203,667
2013	680,451	601,617		1,282,068
2014	739,245	641,947	245,588*	1,626,780
2015	644,237	547,054	758,937	1,950,288
2016	701,195	605,023	792,326	2,098,544
2017	707,472	614,526	804,281	2,126,729
2018	711,321	602,542	798,806	2,112,669
2019	662,304	563,228	746,764	1,972,296
2020	711,128	611,274	811,678	2,134,080
2021	706,730	596,174	815,399	2,118,303
Average Annual Production (years 2015-2021) --->				2,073,200

(*) partial year of operation

== See also ==
- Wind power in Colorado
- List of power stations in Colorado
- List of wind farms in the United States
