= Avenal Solar Facility =

Photovoltaic power station in Kings County, California

- Country: United States
- Location: Kings County
- Coordinates: 35°59′N 120°06′W
- Status: Operational
- Construction began: September 2010
- Commission date: August 5, 2011
- Owners: NRG Solar and Eurus Energy America

Solar farm
- Type: Flat-panel PV
- Site area: 500 acres (200 ha)

Power generation
- Units operational: 450,900; Sharp Electronics (128W thin film)
- Nameplate capacity: 57.7 MW or 45 MW_{AC}
- Annual net output: 58 GWh

The Avenal Solar Facility is a 57.7 megawatt (MW) photovoltaic power station in Kings County, California, constructed using 450,900 SHARP-128W thin-film modules. At its completion, it was California's largest photovoltaic facility.

The power generated is sold to Pacific Gas & Electric, using three separate 20-year power purchase agreements (PPA).

== Units ==
- Sun City (20MW)
- Sand Drag (19MW)
- Avenal Park (6MW)

== Production ==
Generation (MW·h) of Avenal Park
Year	Jan	Feb	Mar	Apr	May	Jun	Jul	Aug	Sep	Oct	Nov	Dec	Total
2011								2,144	1,480	1,183	420	398	5,625
2012	38	377	925	1,338	1,839	1,988	1,719	1,355	1,268	997	510	372	12,726
2013	241	495	842	888	999	1,274	1,202	1,617	1,572	1,392	1,385	1,446	13,353
2014	465	531	935	1,106	1,271	1,409	1,304	1,411	1,377	1,243	1,033	705	12,789
2015	609	768	1,125	1,262	1,269	1,307	1,353	1,370	1,130	952	882	726	12,753
Total													57,246

Generation (MW·h) of Sun City Project LLC
Year	Jan	Feb	Mar	Apr	May	Jun	Jul	Aug	Sep	Oct	Nov	Dec	Total
2011								7,497	5,174	4,136	1,469	1,393	19,668
2012	128	1,275	3,125	4,521	6,215	6,717	5,809	4,577	4,286	3,368	1,723	1,259	43,003
2013	801	1,641	2,794	2,946	3,316	4,225	3,986	5,365	5,215	4,617	4,596	4,796	44,298
2014	1,561	1,781	3,135	3,710	4,262	4,727	4,374	4,733	4,618	4,170	3,465	2,363	42,897
2015	2,039	2,570	3,766	4,226	4,248	4,377	4,530	4,585	3,784	3,188	2,953	2,431	42,695
Total													192,561

Generation (MW·h) of Sand Drag LLC
Year	Jan	Feb	Mar	Apr	May	Jun	Jul	Aug	Sep	Oct	Nov	Dec	Total
2011								6,829	4,713	3,768	1,338	1,269	17,917
2012	120	1,196	2,933	4,243	5,832	6,304	5,451	4,296	4,022	3,161	1,617	1,181	40,357
2013	765	1,567	2,669	2,814	3,167	4,037	3,808	5,125	4,982	4,411	4,391	4,582	42,320
2014	1,482	1,691	2,976	3,522	4,046	4,488	4,153	4,494	4,384	3,959	3,290	2,244	40,729
2015	1,939	2,443	3,581	4,019	4,039	4,162	4,307	4,360	3,598	3,031	2,808	2,311	40,597
Total													181,920

== See also ==
- List of photovoltaic power stations
- El Dorado Solar Power Plant
- Renewable energy in the United States
- Renewable portfolio standard
- Solar power plants in the Mojave Desert
- Solar power in California
