= USS West Avenal =

Cargo ship in United States navy

USS West Avenal (ID-3871)
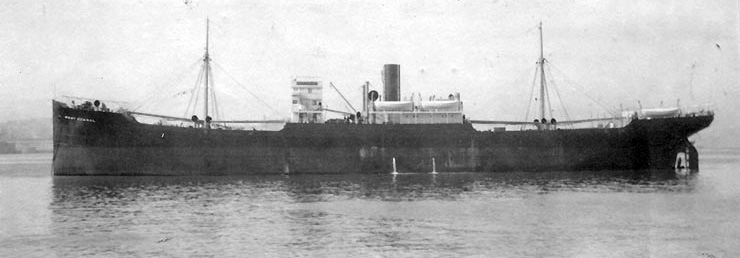
- West Avenal near the time of her completion in February 1919

History

United States
- Name: West Avenal
- Owner: United States Shipping Board
- Builder: Western Pipe and Steel Company; San Francisco, California
- Yard number: 3
- Launched: 13 October 1918
- Completed: 1 February 1919
- Acquired: 1 February 1919
- Commissioned: 1 February 1919
- Decommissioned: 5 April 1919
- Identification: Official Number: 217522
- Fate: Scrapped, 27 August 1929

General characteristics
- Type: Cargo ship
- Tonnage: 5,692 GRT; 8,735 LT DWT
- Displacement: 12,200 t
- Length: 410 ft 5 in (125.10 m) (LPP); 427 ft 0 in (130.15 m) (LOA)
- Beam: 54 ft 0 in (16.46 m)
- Draft: 24 ft 2 in (7.37 m)
- Depth of hold: 29 ft 9 in (9.07 m)
- Propulsion: 1 × steam turbine
- Speed: 10.5 knots (19.4 km/h; 12.1 mph)
- Complement: 70
- Armament: None

USS West Avenal (ID-3871) was a cargo ship in the United States Navy during World War I. She had been built as SS West Avenal for the United States Shipping Board (USSB) as part of the West boats, a series of steel-hulled cargo ships built on the West Coast of the United States. West Avenal was launched in October 1918 by the Western Pipe and Steel Company of San Francisco, California, and delivered to the US Navy when she was completed in February 1919. After she was commissioned and had taken on a load of flour, West Avenal sailed to Norfolk, Virginia, where she was decommissioned in early April.

Though little is available regarding West Avenal's civilian career, she is known from contemporary news account to have visited ports in Spain, Italy, France, Brazil and Uruguay in the early 1920s. In January 1920, West Avenal was rammed by a British cargo ship in New York Harbor and was grounded to prevent her sinking. By late 1928, West Avenal had been abandoned by the USSB, and was scrapped in August 1929.

== Design and construction ==
The West ships were cargo ships of similar size and design built by several shipyards on the West Coast of the United States for the United States Shipping Board (USSB) for emergency use during World War I. All were given names that began with the word West, like West Avenal, one of some 15 West ships built by the Western Pipe and Steel Company of San Francisco, California.

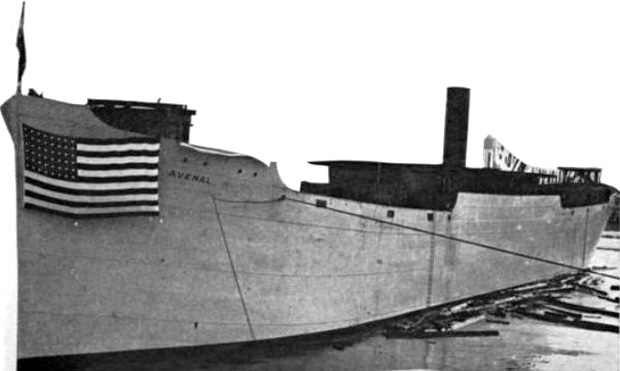
The launching of West Avenal on 13 October 1918

West Avenal (Western Pipe and Steel No. 3) was launched on 13 October 1918, and delivered to the Navy upon completion on 1 February 1919. The ship was 5,692 gross register tons (GRT), and was 410 feet 5 inches (125.10 m) long (between perpendiculars) and 54 feet (16.5 m) abeam. West Avenal had a steel hull and a 29-foot-9-inch (9.07 m) deep hold. She displaced 12,200 t, and had a deadweight tonnage of 8,735 DWT.

In common with the first eight ships built by Western Pipe & Steel, West Avenal was powered by a single General Electric steam turbine rated at 2,500 shaft horsepower, that drove a single screw propeller, and moved the ship at a 10.5 kn (19.4 km/h; 12.1 mph) pace. These General Electric turbines proved unreliable and most of the ships powered by them were either lost or scrapped by the end of the 1920s. Later vessels of the same type built by WPS for the USSB were powered by much more reliable Joshua Hendy triple expansion steam engines, and had considerably longer service lives.

== Career ==
West Avenal (ID-3871) was commissioned into the Navy on 1 February. West Avenal took on an initial load of flour and departed San Francisco on 17 April for New York. She soon developed a steering gear problem and put in at San Diego for repairs. After getting underway again, she transited the Panama Canal and, cutting short her journey, arrived at Norfolk, Virginia, on 4 April. There she was decommissioned the next day and returned to the USSB.

West Avenal departed Norfolk on a voyage to Leith, Scotland on 9 April 1919, but was forced to return to port after suffering an engine breakdown. Following repairs, she made several voyages between the East Coast of the United States and various destinations in South America, Spain, France and England. A few mentions of the ship crop up in contemporary news accounts. In August 1919, for example, The New York Times shows West Avenal slated for departure to Buenos Aires, Argentina, on 12 August. The following January, the newspaper reported that West Avenal was rammed by the British Leyland Line cargo ship Lacastrian. Departing New York in a dense fog on the morning of 9 January 1920 for Antwerp, Lacastrian rammed into the port side of West Avenal, which was inbound with a load of onions from Valencia, Spain. The damage was severe enough that West Avenal's captain ordered her grounded to avoid sinking in New York Harbor. More than two weeks later, The Washington Post printed a photograph of West Avenal, still grounded off the Red Hook flats. Another report in the Times a year later showed her arrival in Saint-Nazaire, France, on 13 August 1920.

In January 1921, The Atlanta Constitution ran a travelogue of a local man who had sailed on West Avenal to South America in August 1919. During his travels, West Avenal had departed the US on 27 August and called at Saint Thomas, U.S. Virgin Islands; Rio de Janeiro (where the ship arrived on 24 September) (Note: West Avenal arrived at Rio de Janeiro the same day King Albert and Queen Elisabeth of Belgium arrived there.) Santos in Brazil; and Montevideo, Uruguay. Another report in The New York Times the following year listed West Avenal's arrival in Genoa, Italy, on 19 January 1921.

West Avenal underwent further repairs in 1921, after which she was laid up by the USSB in the Staten Island Reserve Fleet 3 Section 1. The vessel was delivered at New York City to the Union Shipbuilding Company of Baltimore, Maryland for scrapping on 29 August 1929.

== Bibliography ==
- Crowell, Benedict; Robert Forrest Wilson (1921). The Road to France: The Transportation of Troops and Military Supplies, 1917–1918. How America Went to War: An Account From Official Sources of the Nation's War Activities, 1917–1920. New Haven: Yale University Press. OCLC 18696066.
- Mawdsley, Dean L. (2002): Steel Ships and Iron Pipe: Western Pipe and Steel Company of California, the Company, the Yard, the Ships, Glencannon Press (for Associates of the National Maritime Museum Library), ISBN 1-889901-28-8, pages 8–10, 97.
