= Cedar Point Wind Farm =

Wind farm in Colorado, USA

- Country: United States
- Location: Limon, Colorado
- Coordinates: 39°25′18″N 103°40′41″W
- Status: Operational
- Construction began: August 2010
- Commission date: September 2011
- Construction cost: $500 million
- Owner: Enbridge
- Operator: Enbridge

Wind farm
- Type: Onshore
- Hub height: 80 m
- Rotor diameter: 90 m

Power generation
- Units operational: 139 Vestas turbines
- Make and model: V90/1800 (1.8MW)
- Nameplate capacity: 252.3 MW
- Capacity factor: 31.5% (average 2012-2021)
- Annual net output: 696 GW·h

Cedar Point Wind Farm is a 252.3 megawatt (MW) wind farm in eastern Colorado, United States, north of the town of Limon. It was the second largest wind facility in the state when it was completed in 2011. The electricity is being sold to Xcel Energy under a 20-year power purchase agreement.

== Facility details ==
The facility is located on about 20,000 acres of leased private land 80 miles east of Denver. It extends across western Lincoln County and crosses a few miles into Elbert County. 42 miles of new overhead transmission line carry the electricity to the Xcel Energy substation near Deer Trail in Arapahoe County.

Renewable Energy Systems developed and constructed the project. Numerous turbine components were produced at Vestas' manufacturing facilities in Colorado. Construction began in August 2010 and completed in September 2011, employing about 365 workers. The construction included 139 - 1.8 MW Vestas turbines, two substations, one operations and maintenance building, and transmission lines. The facility is owned and operated by Enbridge, employing about 12 permanent workers. It generates enough electricity to meet the needs of about 80,000 Colorado homes.

== Electricity production ==
Cedar Point Wind Farm Generation (MW·h)
Year	Total Annual MW·h
2011	315,018*
2012	867,709
2013	757,472
2014	764,234
2015	645,035
2016	661,318
2017	743,686
2018	726,656
2019	589,976
2020	710,181
2021	495,999
Average (years 2012–2021) --->	696,226

(*) partial year of operation

== See also ==
- Wind power in the United States
- Wind power in Colorado
- List of onshore wind farms
