= Glencannon Press =

California book publishing company

Glencannon Press is a California-based publishing company that specializes in the publication of books with maritime themes.

The company publishes both fiction and non-fiction books. Its clients include the Friends of the San Francisco Maritime Museum Library, a division of the National Park Service.
