= Cedar Creek Wind Farm =

Wind farm in Colorado, USA

Cedar Creek Wind Farm I & II
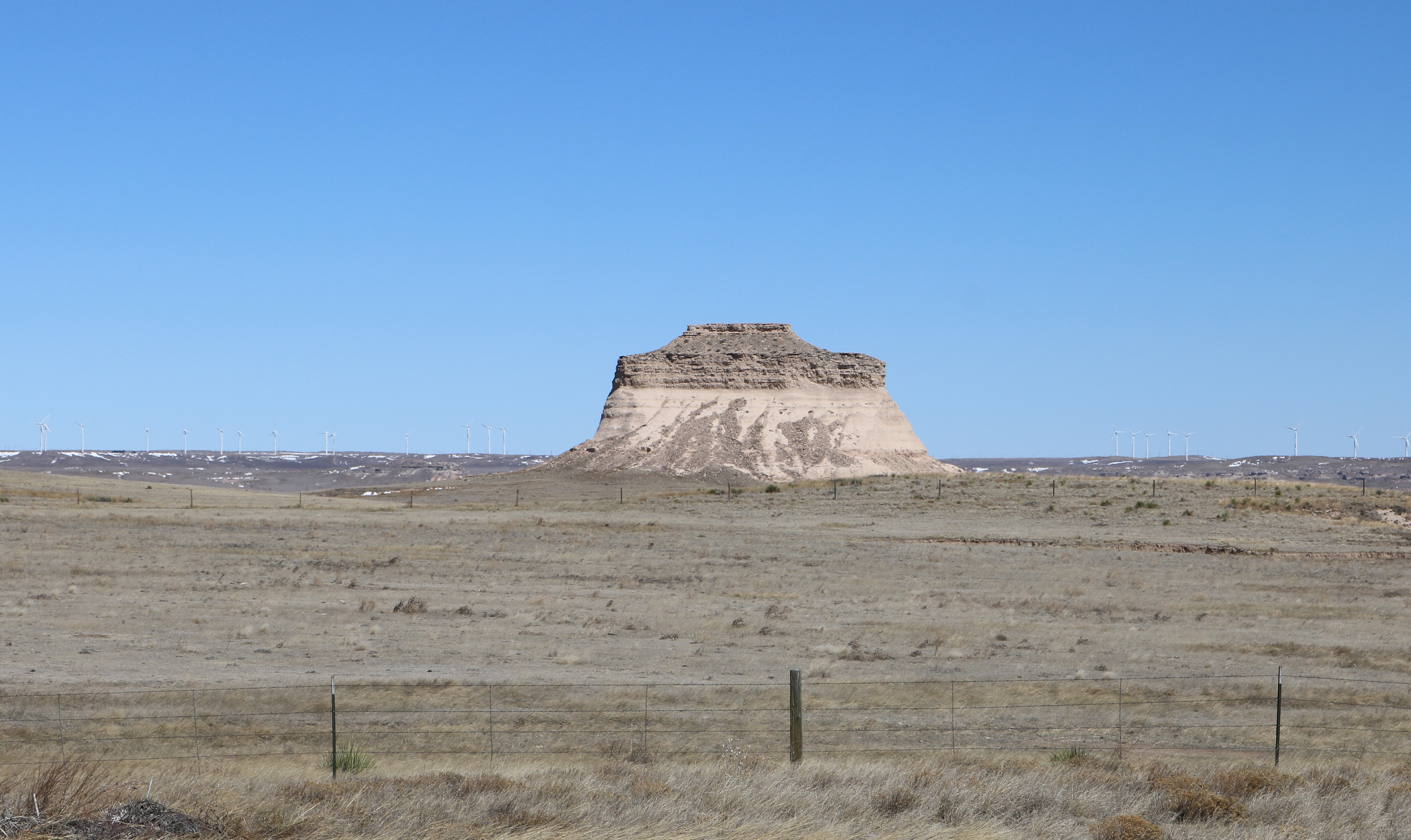
- One of the Pawnee Buttes with the wind farm in the distance.
- Country: United States
- Location: 13km E of Grover, Colorado, United States
- Coordinates: 40°52′16″N 104°5′35″W
- Status: Operational
- Construction began: 2007
- Commission date: 21 November 2007
- Construction cost: US$480 million
- Owners: Cedar Creek I - ArcLight Capital; Cedar Creek II - BP (50%) & Sempra (50%))
- Operators: Cedar Creek I - Infigen Energy; Cedar Creek II - BP Wind Energy

Wind farm
- Type: Onshore
- Site elevation: 1674m

Power generation
- Units operational: 397 - Total; 274 - Cedar Creek I 123 - Cedar Creek II
- Make and model: Mitsubishi, General Electric, Nordex; 221x 1MW Mitsubishi MWT-1000; 53x 1.5MW GE 1.5s/sle 63x 1.6MW GE; 60x 2.5MW Nordex
- Nameplate capacity: 551.3MW - Total; 300.5MW - Cedar Creek I 250.8MW - Cedar Creek II
- Capacity factor: 31.5% (average 2011-2020)
- Annual net output: 1,522 GW·h

The Cedar Creek Wind Farm is a 551.3 megawatt (MW) wind farm located about 8 miles east of the town of Grover in north-central Weld County, Colorado. It consists of 397 wind turbines and was constructed in two phases, Cedar Creek I and Cedar Creek II, becoming fully operational in 2010. The electricity is sold to the Public Service Company of Colorado.

== Details ==
The initial 300.5 MW Cedar Creek I installation was completed on time, within budget, and without incident - with the operation commencing on 21 November 2007. Cedar Creek I is an important contributor to Colorado's New Energy Economy, providing enough wind-powered electricity for 81,135 homes. Cedar Creek II has an additional 250.8 MW of generating capacity, and was commissioned in 2010.

The first phase has 221 1 MW wind turbines from Mitsubishi Heavy Industries and 53 1.5 MW turbines from General Electric. The second phase has an additional 63 1.6 MW SLE turbines from General Electric, and 60 2.5 MW from German wind turbine supplier Nordex.

Cedar Creek I is currently owned by ArcLight Capital. Cedar Creek II is owned by BP Wind Energy (50%) and Sempra (50%).

Electricity from Cedar Creek II reaches the grid through approximately 20 miles of new transmission lines that connect to the Cedar Creek I substation. From there, the project utilizes an existing 76-mile (230kV) transmission line to deliver the electrical power. The Cedar Creek II project employed some 350 workers during peak construction, and some 19 jobs have been created to monitor and maintain the facility.

== Electricity production ==
Cedar Creek Electricity Generation (MW·h)
| Year | Cedar Creek 1 (300.5 MW Unit) | Cedar Creek 2 (250.8 MW Unit) | Total Annual MW·h |
|---|---|---|---|
| 2007 | 106,803 | - | 106,803 |
| 2008 | 972,787 | - | 972,787 |
| 2009 | 913,282 | - | 913,282 |
| 2010 | 841,206 | - | 841,206 |
| 2011 | 891,305 | 508,691 | 1,399,996 |
| 2012 | 837,374 | 801,121 | 1,638,495 |
| 2013 | 879,922 | 811,375 | 1,691,297 |
| 2014 | 842,744 | 758,709 | 1,601,453 |
| 2015 | 744,451 | 654,254 | 1,398,705 |
| 2016 | 852,867 | 751,628 | 1,604,495 |
| 2017 | 794,301 | 713,395 | 1,507,696 |
| 2018 | 813,126 | 713,611 | 1,526,737 |
| 2019 | 707,748 | 661,089 | 1,368,837 |
| 2020 | 787,016 | 694,441 | 1,481,457 |
| 2021 | 516,379 | 476,740 | 993,119 |
| Average Annual Production (years 2011–2020) : | | | 1,521,917 |
| Average Capacity Factor (years 2011–2020) : | | | 31.5% |

== See also ==
- List of wind farms
- Wind power in Colorado
- Wind power in the United States
