= Solar power in Colorado =

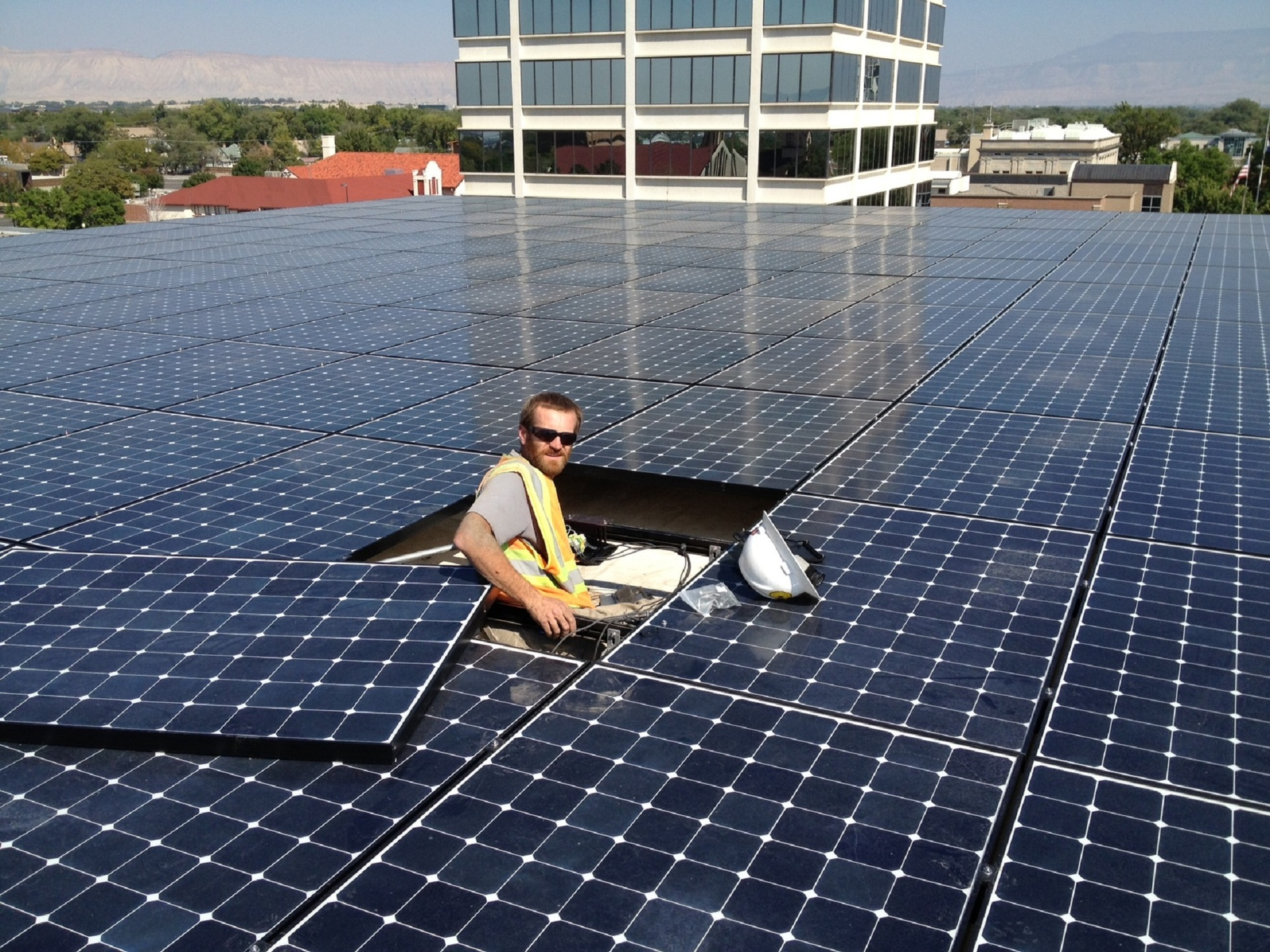
Solar roof installation, Grand Junction

Solar power in Colorado has grown rapidly, partly because of one of the most favorable net metering laws in the country, with no limit on the number of users. The state was the first in the nation to establish a Renewable Portfolio Standard for its electric utilities.

Colorado consumers typically obtain varying amounts of solar power from rooftop solar, community solar gardens, and larger solar farms. Colorado is home to many solar installers which are ranked annually by the amount of power installed. Several thousand people are employed in solar-energy-related activities throughout the state. A few companies have attempted to establish solar panel manufacturing operations in Colorado, including Abound Solar, Ascent Solar, and Primestar Solar. Colorado was the first state where Dow introduced some of the earliest solar shingles.

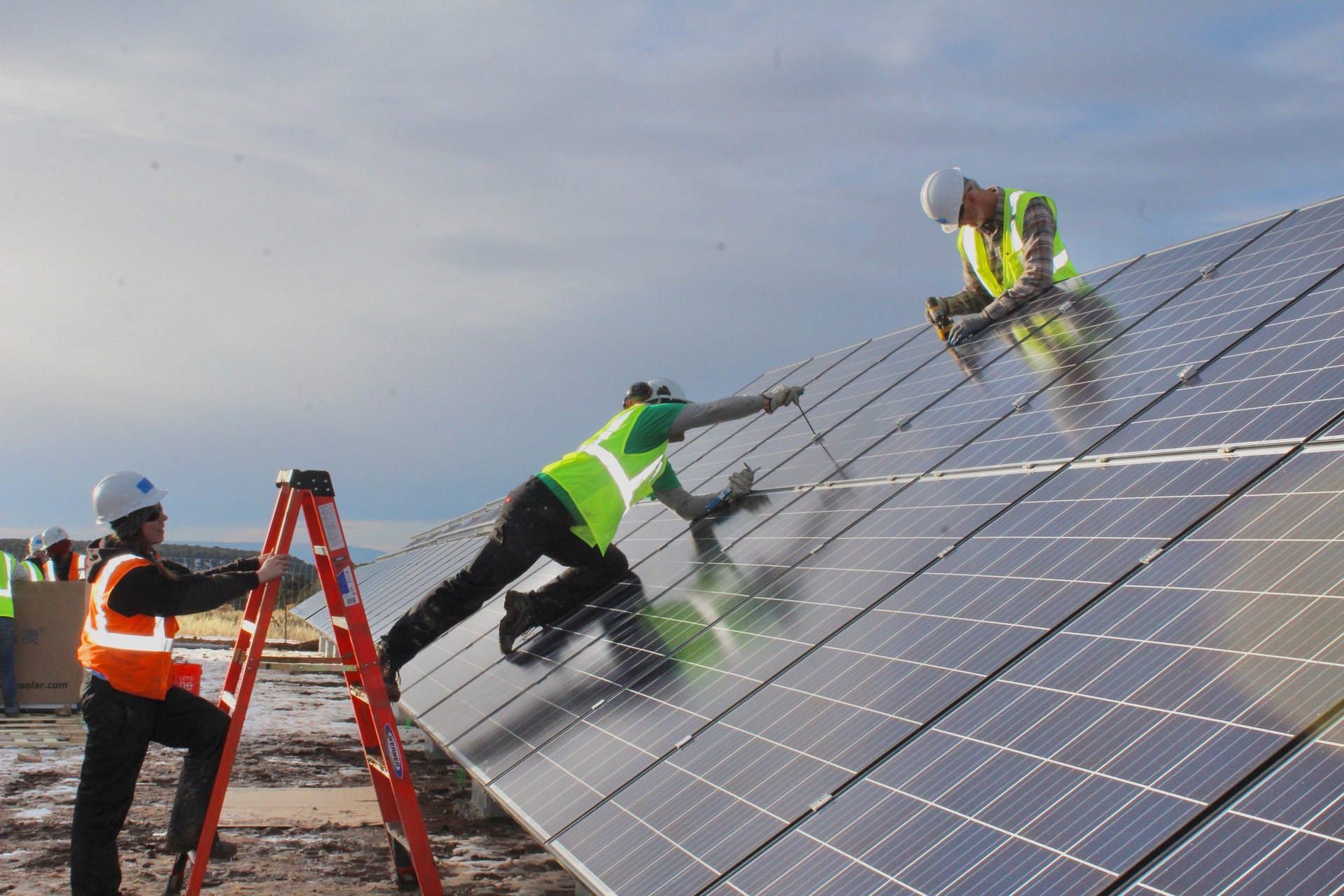
Fitting solar panels, Norwood

The Colorado Solar and Storage Association (COSSA), a state affiliate of the national non-profit Solar Energy Industries Association, supports solar use and industry growth through its efforts which include both business and residential consumer education. The Interstate Renewable Energy Council is also a source for information on consumer protection, workforce development, and for other news affecting industry developments in the state.

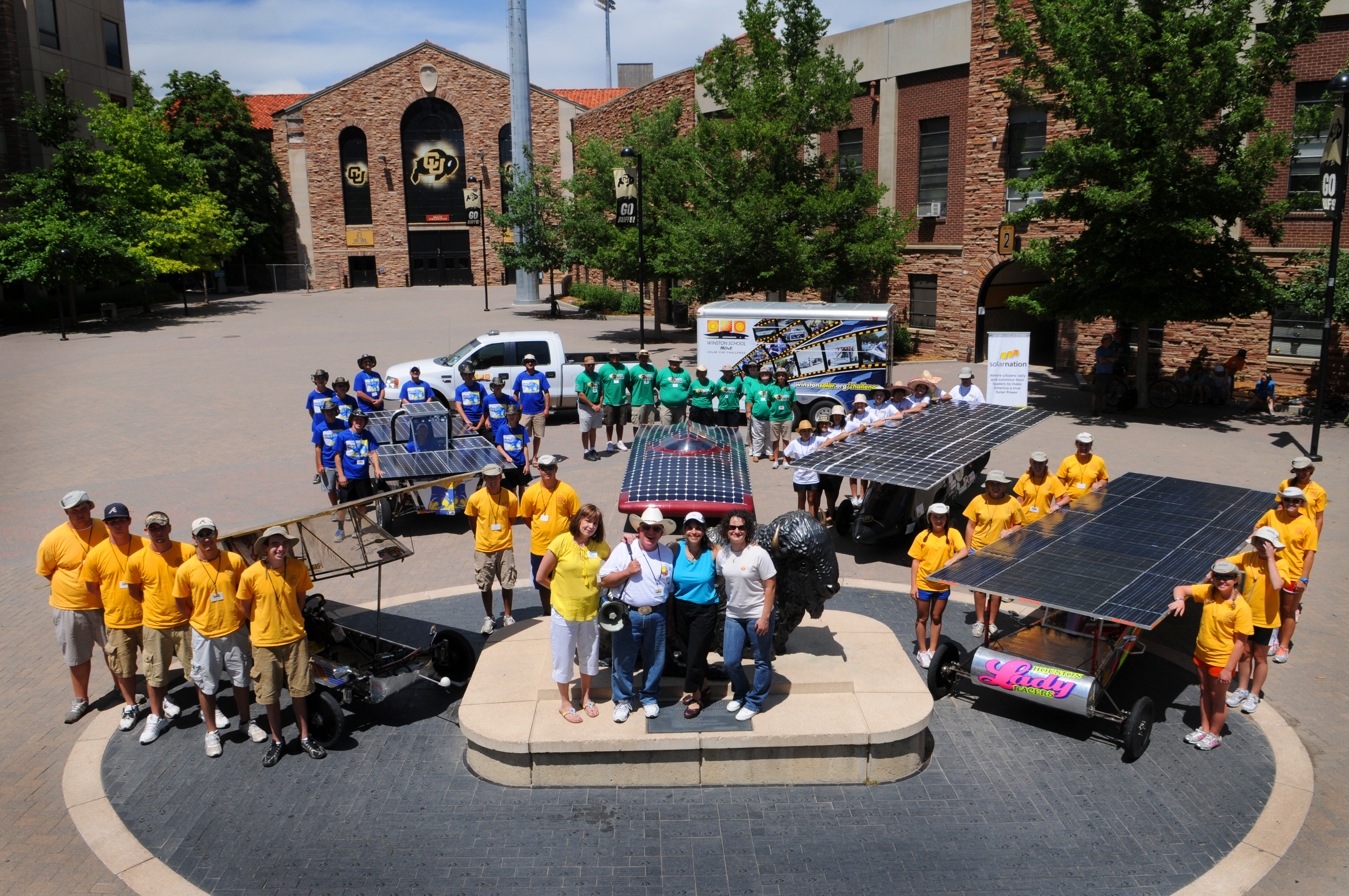
Solar cars in Boulder

Colorado's colleges and universities support educational and research programs in solar power science and technology, and in the related interdisciplinary subjects of energy, environment, and sustainability. Golden, Colorado is home to the National Renewable Energy Laboratory and to the Golden Field Office of the Office of Energy Efficiency and Renewable Energy, both of which are funded by the United States Department of Energy. The Rocky Mountain Institute with offices in Boulder and Basalt in also especially dedicated to promoting efficient energy use within the world's rapidly developing economies.

== Solar farms ==
=== Currently operating (Note: As of December 31, 2025) ===
==== The Great Plains region ====
Solar Facilities in Colorado (The Great Plains Region)
#	Plant Name	Utility Name	County	Capacity (MW)	Operating Year
1	AFA Solar Farm	Solar Star Colorado II LLC	El Paso	5.5	2011
2	Adams Community Solar Garden III LLC	Adams Community Solar Garden III LLC	Adams	1.2	2015
3	Adams Community Solar Garden LLC	Adams Community Solar Garden LLC	Adams	1.2	2015
4	Airport 1 Solar (DIA)	CleanCapital Holdings	Adams	1.5	2009
5	Alden Solar CSG LLC	Greenbacker Renewable Energy Corporation	Weld	1.6	2020
6	Amazon DEN2 Solar Project	Solar Star Prime 1 LLC	Adams	1.9	2019
7	Amazon Denver DEN3	Westbound Solar LLC	Adams	4.6	2019
8	Arapahoe 3 Community Solar Array	MN8 Energy LLC	Arapahoe	1.7	2017
9	BH CSG 3	Pivot Energy	Otero	1.5	2023
10	BecLee Solar CSG	SunShare Management	Weld	5.0	2025
11	Bighorn Solar 1	Lightsource Renewable Energy Asset Management, LLC	Pueblo	240.0	2021
12	Black Hollow Sun	Contour Global	Weld	150.0	2025
13	Brighton PV Solar Plant	Hangar 160 LLC	Adams	1.8	2012
14	CBEP SOLAR 6, LLC	Green Street Power Partners	Weld	4.5	2025
15	CBEP Solar 1, LLC	Green Street Power Partners	Logan	5.0	2023
16	CBEP Solar 4, LLC	Green Street Power Partners	Weld	4.0	2023
17	CBEP Solar 5, LLC	Green Street Power Partners	Weld	5.0	2023
18	CBEP Solar 7	Green Street Power Partners	Weld	5.0	2024
19	CEC Solar #1117, LLC	Altus Power America Management, LLC	Pueblo	1.5	2018
20	CO LI CSG 1 - Kamerra	Standard Solar	Adams	1.5	2019
21	CSU Pueblo	Scale Sustainable I, LLC	Pueblo	1.0	2008
22	CSWIND America Inc.	CS Wind America, Inc.	Pueblo	12.3	2023
23	Carson Solar I	Carson Solar 1 LLC	El Paso	2.0	2007
24	Clear Spring Ranch PV Project	Madison Energy Investments LLC	El Paso	10.0	2016
25	Comanche Solar	Onward Energy	Pueblo	120.0	2016
26	DIA 8	Altus Power America Management, LLC	Adams	4.5	2023
27	DIA 9	Greenbacker Renewable Energy Corporation	Adams	9.8	2024
28	Denver Metro Solar	Denver Metro Solar LLC	Adams	1.6	2017
29	Dove Solar CSG	SunShare Management	Weld	5.0	2025
30	ECA CO Greeley	Green Street Power Partners	Weld	3.3	2024
31	Fort Morgan Solar	SE Municipal Colorado, LLC	Morgan	3.4	2025
32	Gilcrest Solar	Terraform Arcadia	Weld	1.5	2018
33	Gilcrest Sun CSG	SunShare Management	Weld	1.8	2021
34	Gilcrest V CSG	SunShare Management	Weld	4.8	2021
35	Grazing Yak Solar	Grazing Yak Solar, LLC	El Paso	35.0	2019
36	Hunter Solar, LLC (CO)	Hunter Solar, LLC	Arapahoe	75.0	2023
37	Imboden Solar Garden	Onsite Partners, LLC	Adams	3.0	2018
38	Lark Bunting Solar CSG	SunShare Management	Weld	5.0	2025
39	Logan 1 Community Solar Array	MN8 Energy LLC	Logan	1.5	2017
40	Mtn Solar 6 LLC (CSG)	Nautilus Solar Solutions	Logan	1.5	2022
41	Mtn. Solar 1	Standard Solar	Adams	1.5	2019
42	Mtn. Solar 2	Standard Solar	Adams	1.5	2019
43	Mtn. Solar 3 CSG	Standard Solar	Morgan	1.5	2020
44	NSE Camber BH CSG 2, LLC	Nautilus Solar Solutions	Crowley	1.5	2021
45	NSE Camber Solar PS11 LLC (CSG)	Nautilus Solar Solutions	Logan	1.5	2022
46	NSE Camber Solar PS13 LLC (CSG)	Nautilus Solar Solutions	Logan	1.5	2022
47	NSE Camber Solar PS5 LLC (CSG)	Nautilus Solar Solutions	Weld	1.5	2022
48	NSE Camber Solar PS6 LLC CSG	Nautilus Solar Solutions	Weld	1.5	2022
49	Neptune Energy Center Hybrid	Neptune Energy Center, LLC	Pueblo	325.0	2023
50	Oak Leaf - CSG Portfolio (OL 36)	Distributed Solar Development, LLC	Arapahoe	1.5	2021
51	Oak Leaf - CSG Portfolio (OL 37)	Distributed Solar Development, LLC	Adams	1.5	2020
52	Oak Leaf - CSG Portfolio (OL 38)	Distributed Solar Development, LLC	Adams	1.5	2021
53	Oak Leaf - CSG Portfolio (OL 39)	Distributed Solar Development, LLC	Arapahoe	1.5	2021
54	Oak Leaf - CSG Portfolio (OL 44)	Distributed Solar Development, LLC	Adams	1.5	2020
55	Oak Leaf Solar XVIII LLC	Altus Power America Management, LLC	Adams	9.0	2021
56	Oak Leaf Solar XXI (CSG)	Greenbacker Renewable Energy Corporation	Arapahoe	1.5	2018
57	Oak Leaf Solar XXII LLC (CSG)	Greenbacker Renewable Energy Corporation	Adams	1.5	2019
58	Oak Leaf Solar XXIII LLC (CSG)	Greenbacker Renewable Energy Corporation	Adams	1.5	2019
59	Oak Leaf Solar XXIV LLC (CSG)	Greenbacker Renewable Energy Corporation	Arapahoe	1.5	2019
60	Oak Leaf Solar XXV LLC (CSG)	Greenbacker Renewable Energy Corporation	Arapahoe	1.5	2018
61	Oak Leaf Solar XXVI LLC	Greenbacker Renewable Energy Corporation	Adams	1.5	2019
62	Oak Leaf Solar XXVII LLC	Greenbacker Renewable Energy Corporation	Weld	1.5	2018
63	Oak Leaf Solar XXVIII LLC (CSG)	Greenbacker Renewable Energy Corporation	Weld	1.5	2019
64	Overland	Greenbacker Renewable Energy Corporation	Weld	11.0	2024
65	Palmer Solar	Deriva Energy	El Paso	60.0	2020
66	Panasonic Carport Solar Hybrid	Public Service Co of Colorado	Adams	1.3	2017
67	Pike Solar Hybrid	Deriva Energy	El Paso	175.0	2023
68	Pikes Peak Solar Garden 1 LLC CSG	Pikes Peak Solar Garden 1 LLC	El Paso	2.0	2015
69	Pioneer Solar (CO), LLC	Pioneer Solar (CO), LLC	Adams	80.0	2021
70	Pivot Solar 10	Nautilus Solar Solutions	Arapahoe	1.7	2024
71	Pivot Solar 14 LLC (CSG)	Nautilus Solar Solutions	Morgan	1.5	2022
72	Pivot Solar 2 LLC (CSG)	Nautilus Solar Solutions	Morgan	1.5	2022
73	Pivot Solar 20	Pivot Energy	Weld	5.0	2023
74	Pivot Solar 21	Pivot Energy	Arapahoe	5.0	2024
75	Pivot Solar 30	Pivot Energy	Weld	5.0	2025
76	Pivot Solar 32	Pivot Energy	Morgan	5.0	2025
77	Pivot Solar 35	Pivot Energy	Weld	3.9	2024
78	Pivot Solar 37	Pivot Energy	Logan	2.5	2024
79	Pivot Solar 4 LLC (CSG)	Nautilus Solar Solutions	Weld	1.5	2022
80	Pivot Solar 52	Pivot Energy	Morgan	3.7	2025
81	Pivot Solar 8 LLC (CSG)	Nautilus Solar Solutions	Weld	1.5	2022
82	Pivot Solar 9	Nautilus Solar Solutions	Arapahoe	1.7	2024
83	Platteville Solar CSG, LLC	Greenbacker Renewable Energy Corporation	Weld	1.3	2020
84	Quincy II Solar Garden	Onsite Partners, LLC	Arapahoe	1.5	2018
85	Quincy Solar (CO)	Terraform Arcadia	Arapahoe	1.5	2018
86	Riverview Solar	Highline Services, LLC	Logan	1.5	2019
87	Rocky Mountain Solar	Public Service Co of Colorado	Pueblo	325.0	2025
88	SR Jenkins Ft Lupton	SR Jenkins, LLC	Weld	13.0	2016
89	SR Kersey	SR Kersey, LLC	Weld	3.5	2017
90	SR Kersey II	SR Kersey II, LLC	Weld	1.0	2019
91	SR Mavericks	SR Mavericks, LLC	Weld	7.8	2016
92	SR Platte Solar Farm	SR Platte, LLC	Weld	16.0	2017
93	SR Rattlesnake	SR Rattlesnake, LLC	Weld	6.0	2020
94	SR Skylark B	SR Skylark B, LLC	Weld	2.0	2016
95	SR Skylark C	SR Skylark C, LLC	Weld	1.1	2019
96	Skylark	SR Clinch, LLC	Weld	4.0	2015
97	Sterling PV 3	CleanCapital Holdings	Logan	1.6	2014
98	Sun Mountain Solar 1	Lightsource Renewable Energy Asset Management, LLC	Pueblo	200.0	2022
99	Thunder Wolf Energy Center Hybrid	Thunder Wolf Energy Center, LLC	Pueblo	248.0	2023
100	Titan Solar	Titan Solar, LLC	Arapahoe	50.0	2018
101	Trane Pueblo	Trane US Inc	Pueblo	1.4	2023
102	TruStile Doors - Denver	SkyHigh 2 Solar	Adams	1.2	2021
103	USS Auburn Solar	USS Auburn Solar LLC	Weld	4.9	2025
104	USS Cogburn Solar LLC (CSG)	United States Solar Corporation	Weld	2.4	2024
105	USS Giveback Solar LLC (CSG)	United States Solar Corporation	Pueblo	2.0	2023
106	USS Hampden Solar LLC	United States Solar Corporation	Arapahoe	5.0	2025
107	Valley View Solar	SR Clinch, LLC	Weld	4.0	2015
108	Vasquez V CSG	SunShare Management	Weld	4.0	2021
109	Venture 1 - 1A CSG	UXI CSG Venture 1 8301 LLC	Adams	1.5	2021
110	Venture 2 - 1B	UXI CSG Venture 2 8302 LLC	Adams	1.5	2021
111	Venture 3 - 1C	UXI CSG Venture 3 8303 LLC	Adams	1.5	2021
112	Venture 4 - 1D	UXI CSG Venture 4 8304 LLC	Adams	1.5	2021
113	Victory Solar LLC	Deriva Energy	Adams	12.8	2016
114	Vilas Solar Array	Onsite Partners, LLC	Baca	4.0	2017
115	Weld 1 Community Solar Array	MN8 Energy LLC	Weld	1.5	2017
116	Xcel Adams 1 Community Solar Array	MN8 Energy LLC	Adams	1.8	2017
117	Xcel Adams 2 Community Solar Array	MN8 Energy LLC	Adams	1.5	2017
118	Yuma Solar	SE Municipal Colorado, LLC	Yuma	2.8	2025

==== The Rocky Mountains region ====
Solar Facilities in Colorado (The Rocky Mountains Region)
#	Plant Name	Utility Name	County	Capacity (MW)	Operating Year
1	Ameresco HCE Solar LLC	Ameresco HCE Solar LLC	Garfield	4.5	2023
2	Axial Basin Solar	Tri-State G & T Assn, Inc	Moffat	145.0	2025
3	Bar D	Cypress Creek Renewables	Rio Blanco	4.0	2018
4	Bison Solar LLC	Bison Solar LLC	Larimer	30.0	2016
5	CBEP Solar 3	Green Street Power Partners	Larimer	2.4	2025
6	CO- CSU- Fort Collins	RV CSU Power LLC	Larimer	1.9	2009
7	CO- CSU- Fort Collins II	RV CSU Power II LLC	Larimer	3.0	2010
8	City of Boulder WWTP	SunE NLB-2, LLC	Boulder	1.0	2010
9	Coyote Ridge Community Solar	Poudre Valley REA, Inc	Larimer	1.5	2017
10	Eagle Springs Solar LLC	Eagle Springs Solar LLC	Garfield	1.0	2013
11	East Victory Way Solar	East Victory Way Solar LLC	Moffat	4.0	2023
12	Fremont CO 1, LLC	Greenbacker Renewable Energy Corporation	Fremont	1.8	2020
13	High Mesa CO	AES Clean Energy	Garfield	11.2	2025
14	IBM Solar	Madison Energy Investments LLC	Boulder	8.1	2019
15	Jack's Solar Garden	Jack's Solar Garden	Boulder	1.0	2020
16	Jeffco Community Solar Gardens LLC	SunShare Management	Jefferson	1.2	2016
17	Lafayette Horizon Solar CSG LLC	AES Distributed Energy	Boulder	1.6	2019
18	Mamm Creek	AES Clean Energy	Garfield	11.2	2025
19	Mtn. Solar 4 (CSG)	Standard Solar	Jefferson	1.5	2021
20	Oak Leaf Solar XXXII (CSG)	Greenbacker Renewable Energy Corporation	Garfield	1.5	2019
21	Oak Leaf Solar XXXIII LLC (Lantz)	Greenbacker Renewable Energy Corporation	Chaffee	3.0	2020
22	Pitkin County Solar	Coolangatta Solar LLC	Pitkin	5.0	2021
23	Pivot Solar 3 LLC (CSG)	Nautilus Solar Solutions	Garfield	1.5	2022
24	Pivot Solar 34	Pivot Energy	Boulder	4.5	2025
25	Pivot Solar 7 LLC (CSG)	Nautilus Solar Solutions	Garfield	1.5	2022
26	Rawhide Prairie Solar Hybrid	Greenbacker Renewable Energy Corporation	Larimer	22.0	2021
27	Sunnyside Ranch Community Solar Array	Holy Cross Electric Assn, Inc	Garfield	1.5	2015
28	Tom Sifers Solar	Mountain Parks Services, Inc.	Grand	1.0	2019
29	Trout Creek Solar	Onsite Partners, LLC	Chaffee	2.0	2019
30	WWRF Solar Plant	SunE U6 Holdings LLC	Garfield	1.5	2009
31	Wheeler Gulch Solar, LLC	Standard Solar	Garfield	9.9	2023
32	Whiskey Hill Solar	Mountain Parks Services, Inc.	Jackson	1.0	2019

==== The Colorado Plateau region ====
Solar Facilities in Colorado (The Colorado Plateau Region)
#	Plant Name	Utility Name	County	Capacity (MW)	Operating Year
1	Ash Mesa Solar, LLC	Headwater Energy, LLC	Montrose	7.8	2022
2	Cortez Solar 1, LLC	Altus Power America Management, LLC	Montezuma	2.2	2022
3	Cortez Solar 2, LLC	Altus Power America Management, LLC	Montezuma	5.0	2023
4	Cortez Solar 3, LLC	Altus Power America Management, LLC	Montezuma	2.0	2023
5	Dolores Canyon Solar	Tri-State G & T Assn, Inc	Dolores	110.0	2025
6	Garnet Mesa Solar	Garnet Mesa Solar LLC	Delta	80.0	2025
7	LPEA Sunnyside Solar 1 Facility	La Plata Electric Assn, Inc	La Plata	1.7	2024
8	Mesa CSG 1 Murdock	Standard Solar	Mesa	1.5	2019
9	Mesa CSG 2 Massicotte	Standard Solar	Mesa	1.5	2019
10	Mesa PV1	CleanCapital Holdings	Mesa	1.6	2014
11	Oak Leaf Solar XXXI LLC (CSG)	Greenbacker Renewable Energy Corporation	Mesa	1.5	2018
12	SMPA Solar 1 Community Solar	San Miguel Power Assn, Inc	Montrose	1.0	2012
13	USS Fruita Solar LLC CSG	United States Solar Corporation	Mesa	2.0	2024

The 7.7 megawatt (MW_{AC}) Alamosa Photovoltaic Power Plant completed in 2007 in the San Luis Valley was one of the first utility-scale solar farms in the U.S. utilizing photovoltaics. More than a dozen additional facilities sized between 5 and 50 MW came online throughout the state during the following decade. The 120 MW Comanche Solar Project located near Pueblo was the state's largest solar farm as of 2017.

== Installed capacity ==
As of 2017, Colorado was the 12th largest solar state in the U.S., with nearly 1 gigawatt of cumulative solar capacity installed.

Colorado Solar Capacity (MWp)
Year	Photovoltaics			CSP		
Year	Capacity	Installed	% change	Capacity	Installed	% change
2007	14.6	11.5	371%			
2008	35.7	21.7	145%			
2009	59.1	23.4	66%			
2010	121.1	62.0	105%	1	1	
2011	196.7	75.5	62%	2.4	1.4	
2012	299.6	102.9	52%	31.8	29.4	
2013	360.4	58.0	19%	31.8	0	
2014	400	67	20%	31.8	0	
2015	544	144	36%	31.8	0	
2016	921	377	69%	31.8	0	
2017	1,019	98	11%	31.8	0	
2018	1,197	178	17%	31.8	0	
2019	1,377.6	180.6	15%	31.8	0	
2020	1,708.3	330.7	24%	31.8	0	
2021	2,183.2	474.9	%			

== Generation ==
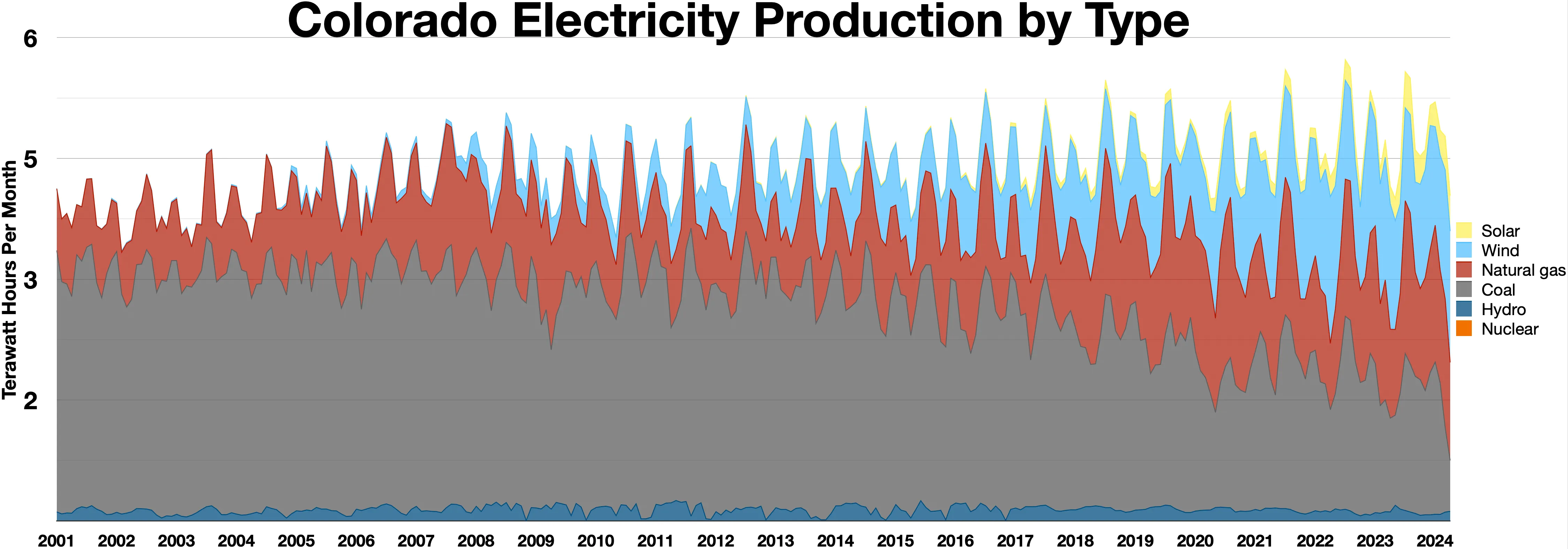
Colorado electricity production by type

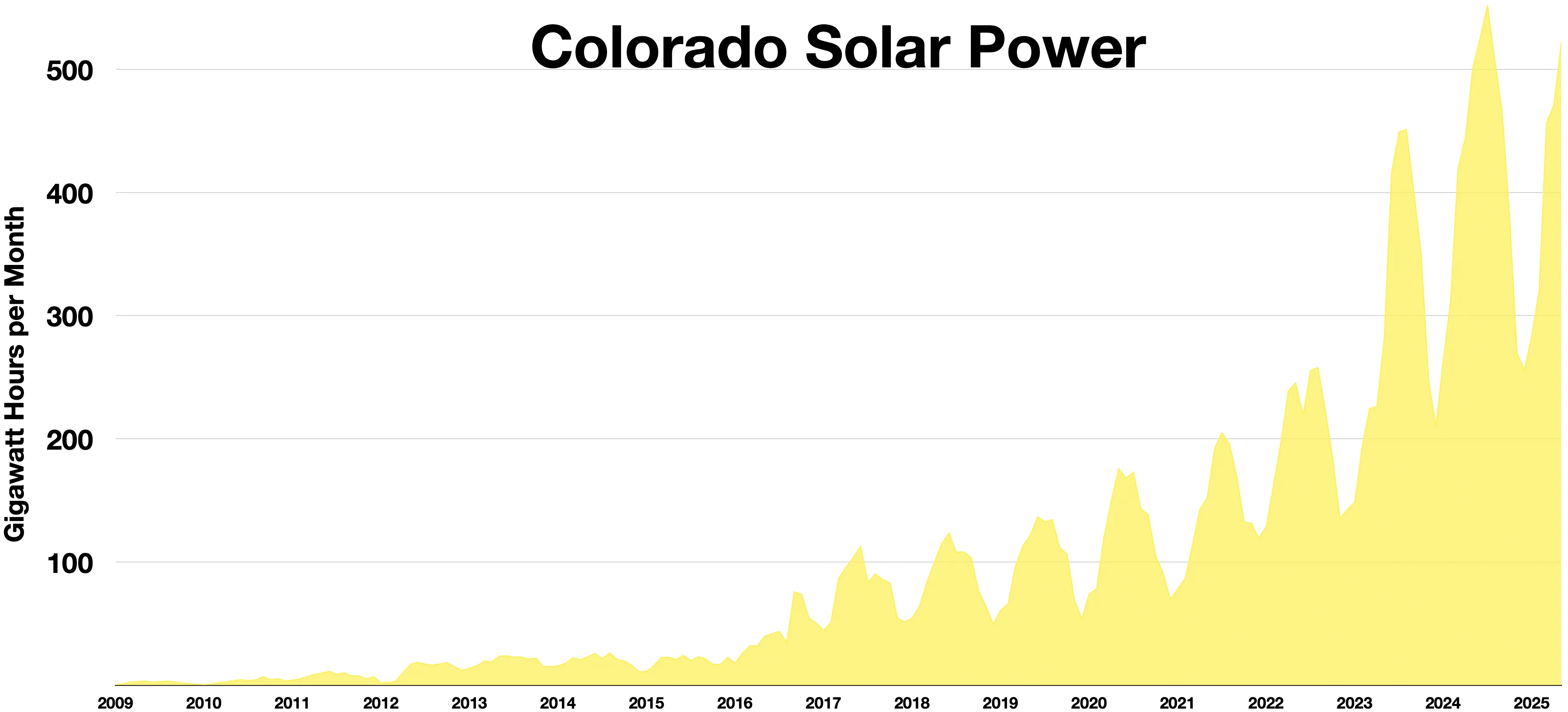
Colorado solar power from 2009 to 2025

Total solar generation in Colorado (GWh)
Year	Total	% growth	Jan	Feb	Mar	Apr	May	Jun	Jul	Aug	Sep	Oct	Nov	Dec
2014	606		38	40	52	53	58	61	57	61	54	52	44	36
2015	643	5.8%	34	39	57	59	58	66	62	64	60	51	45	48
2016	999	35.6%	47	57	71	74	87	91	92	80	120	115	87	80
2017	1,485	32.7%	75	85	132	146	159	169	138	143	134	128	91	85
2018	1,653	10.2%	91	101	137	156	175	185	169	166	158	124	104	87
2019	1,852	10.7%	100	106	152	173	186	204	201	199	172	158	110	92
2020	2,204	16.0%	117	121	179	213	249	241	245	212	203	166	143	116
2021	2,790	26.6%	132	143	196	227	242	307	312	304	276	231	224	198
2022	3,819	26.9%	217	250	318	368	391	373	395	383	347	310	238	229

== See also ==
- Wind power in Colorado
- Solar power in the United States
- Renewable energy in the United States
