= Wind power in Colorado =

Electricity from wind in one U.S. state

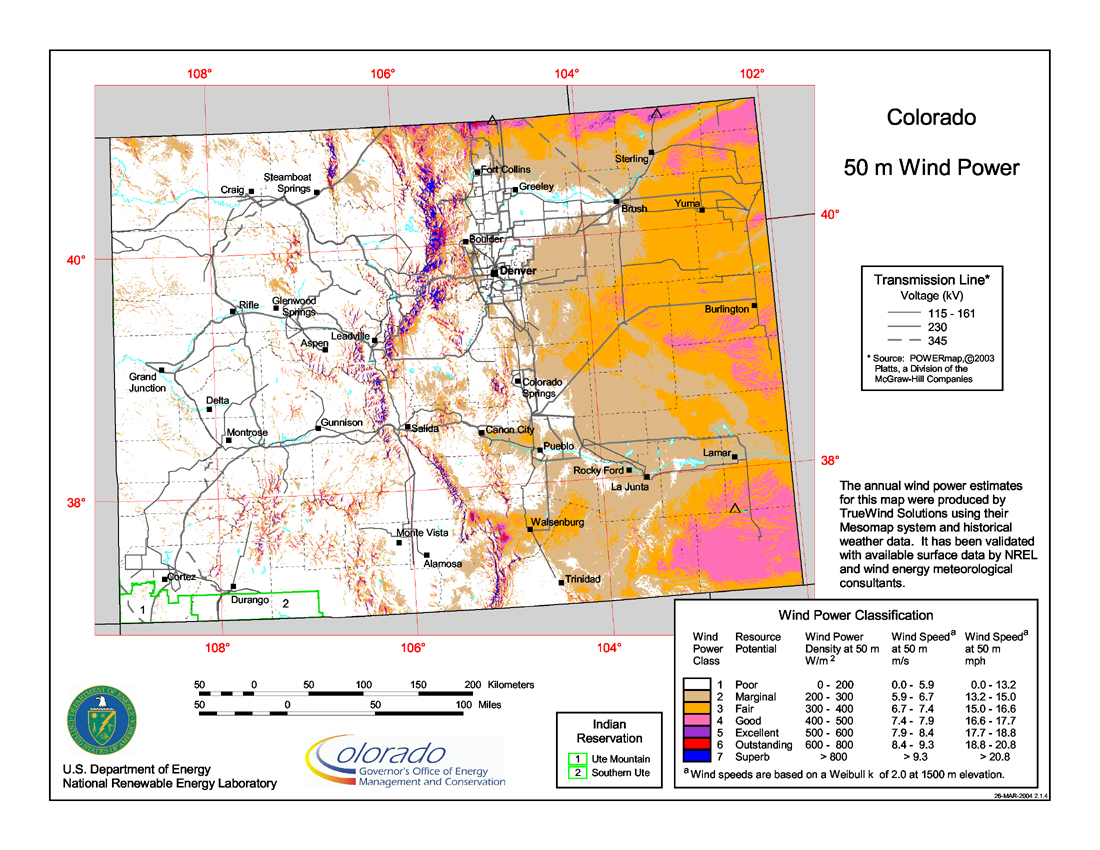
Colorado wind resources

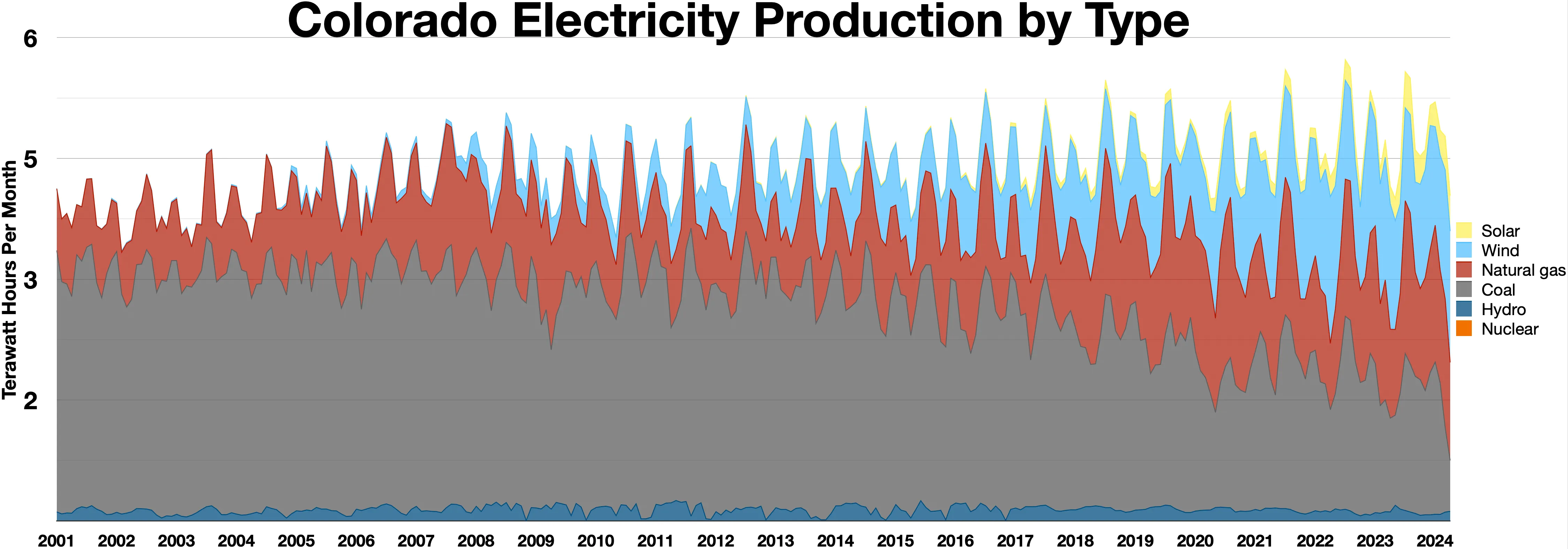
Colorado electricity production by type

The US state of Colorado has vast wind energy resources and the installed electricity capacity and generation from wind power in Colorado has been growing significantly in recent years. The growth has been sustained due to a combination of falling costs (69% reduction from 2009 to 2018), continuing federal incentives (similar to those supporting most other resource development), and the state's aggressive renewable portfolio standard that requires 30% of the state's electricity to come from renewable sources by 2020.

Wind power accounted for 14.2% of total electricity generated in Colorado during 2015. Its share increased to more than 17% for years 2016 through 2018. As of the end of 2018, more than three times as much power was produced by wind within the state as was produced from all other renewable sources combined.

The cities of Brighton and Windsor are home to three Vestas manufacturing facilities. Overall, it is estimated that each wind turbine deployed supports about 30 jobs over the course of its lifetime through its manufacturing, supply chain, construction, and operation.

== History ==
Colorado voters approved Amendment 37 which required the state's largest utilities to obtain 3 percent of their electricity from renewable energy resources by 2007, and 10 percent by 2015. More recently, in 2010, the state approved a renewable portfolio standard that requires 30% of the state's electricity to come from renewable sources by 2020.

== Growth in generating capacity and production ==
Colorado has the potential to install 387,220 MW of wind power generating capacity according to a 2010 U.S. DOE study. The graphs below show the growth in the installed capacity (measured in megawatts (MW) along with the growth in the actual electrical energy produced (measured in gigawatt-hours (GW·h) within the state for more than the past decade.

Colorado wind generating capacity by year
Megawatts of generating capacity

Colorado wind electricity production by year
Gigawatt-hours of electricity

Colorado wind generation (GWh, million kWh)
Year	Total	Jan	Feb	Mar	Apr	May	Jun	Jul	Aug	Sep	Oct	Nov	Dec
2001	48	4	2	2	3	3	2	1	3	2	5	5	16
2002	141	16	15	11	13	11	10	8	10	10	10	12	15
2003	147	17	11	17	13	11	9	8	9	10	12	14	16
2004	221	14	14	17	12	13	9	7	8	11	27	29	60
2005	776	106	85	98	48	44	58	63	40	64	55	58	57
2006	868	74	78	88	90	62	73	58	51	56	99	71	68
2007	1,292	80	62	84	82	50	55	55	56	126	201	221	220
2008	3,222	326	303	307	302	296	246	165	193	166	257	332	329
2009	3,164	426	278	267	321	231	150	147	204	248	311	277	304
2010	3,451	249	234	301	368	335	262	204	209	257	275	341	416
2011	5,202	415	387	392	465	513	426	310	348	332	507	551	556
2012	5,968	629	544	560	551	426	489	347	432	345	478	495	672
2013	7,205	669	714	688	555	570	588	505	381	543	662	624	706
2014	7,368	803	550	685	753	599	571	418	369	517	633	810	660
2015	7,474	765	628	684	668	630	425	447	558	473	668	657	871
2016	9,423	782	1,001	941	864	738	556	633	584	732	789	929	874
2017	9,316	835	804	875	907	850	628	501	618	577	921	837	963
2018	9,744	857	724	1,005	986	697	798	739	716	699	721	756	1,046
2019	10,854	942	848	924	1,014	867	781	896	789	1,041	923	940	889
2020	13,387	1,235	995	898	898	1,319	992	1,079	1,059	1,038	1,038	1,287	1,549
2021	15,030	1,302	907	1,406	1,364	1,281	1,103	1,071	1,190	1,135	1,260	1,350	1,661
2022	16,701	1,416	1,308	1,563	1,793	1,567	1,441	1,237	1,108	1,144	1,040	1,520	1,564
2023	4,243	1,283	1,464	1,496									

== Seasonal pattern of wind generation ==
Electricity production from wind power in Colorado tends to peak during the winter months, as shown in the graph below. This pattern complements the electricity production from solar power in Colorado, which peaks during the summer months.

Colorado wind generation in 2016

Sources:EIA Electric Power Monthly, EIA Electricity Data Browser

== Wind farms ==
The Ponnequin Wind Farm on the Colorado-Wyoming border in Weld County was the state's earliest large-scale wind farm built to a capacity of 25.3 MW during the 1990s and decommissioned starting 2015. It was surpassed in 2001 by the first phase of the Peetz Table Wind Complex at a capacity of just under 30 MW. The site west of the town of Peetz in northeastern Colorado grew to 430 MW in 2007 and consists of three farms: Ridge Crest (the original Peetz Table Wind), Logan, and Peetz Table. In 2009, the majority owner NextEra Energy Resources also completed the 174 MW Northern Colorado Wind Energy Center to the east of Peetz.

The Spring Canyon Wind Energy Center including the Spring Canyon Expansion - also east of Peetz - have a combined capacity rating of over 120 MW spread over 75 wind turbines. These two neighboring sites were built by Chicago-based clean energy company Invenergy LLC in 2006 and 2014, respectively. Invenergy continues operation of these sites which provide power to the Platte River Power Authority including the cities of Fort Collins, Loveland and Longmont in Colorado.

The Cedar Creek Wind Farm north of Grover, Colorado became the largest wind farm at 550 MW in 2011. Phase 1 was built in 2007 and has 300 MW of generation capacity from 274 wind turbines. Cedar Creek II was built in 2011 and has 250 MW of generation capacity from 60 Nordex and 63 GE wind turbines.

In 2014, the Limon Wind Energy Center became the state's largest wind facility, at just over 600 MW capacity. In 2018, it was nearly matched in capacity by the nearby Rush Creek Wind Project.

== See also ==
- Solar power in Colorado
- Environmental impact of wind power
- Wind power in the United States
- List of wind farms in the United States
- List of U.S. states by electricity production from renewable sources
