= TMEIC =

Japanese industrial systems company

TMEIC Corporation
- Native name: 株式会社TMEIC
- Type: Joint venture
- Industry: Industrial manufacturing plants
- Founded: 2003; 23 years ago
- Headquarters: Tokyo, Japan
- Area served: Worldwide
- Key people: Akira Kawaguchi (president and CEO)
- Products: Power electronics apparatus, large capacity electric motors and automation systems, uninterruptible power supplies.
- Revenue: ¥212.9 billion (Non-consolidated,2022)
- Owners: Toshiba; Mitsubishi Electric
- Number of employees: 2693 (Japan), 4505 (Global as of 31 March 2023)
- Website: www.tmeic.com

TMEIC Corporation (株式会社TMEIC) (/ˈtiːmaɪk/ TEE-myke) is a joint venture between Toshiba and Mitsubishi Electric headquartered in Tokyo, Japan, specializing in industrial electric and automation systems for industrial plants. The company develops and produces power electronics apparatus, electric motors, drives, and uninterruptible power supplies. TMEIC has worldwide operations with approximately 4500 employees.

== Divisions ==
- Industrial Systems
- Industrial Automation and Drive Systems
- Power Electronics Systems
- Rotating Machinery Systems

== History ==
Tokyo Electric Company, the predecessor of Toshiba Corporation, was founded in 1896.

Mitsubishi Electric Corporation was founded in 1921.

In 1999, Toshiba and Mitsubishi Electric established TMA Electric Corporation (TMAE), a joint venture specializing in rotating machinery. In 2000, Toshiba and General Electric Company formed Toshiba GE Automation Systems (TGAJ) operating in sales and engineering of industrial plant systems.

Toshiba and Mitsubishi Electric have decided to unify TMAE, TGAJ and their industrial systems division to form a joint venture named Toshiba Mitsubishi-Electric Industrial Systems Corporation (TMEIC). TMEIC started business on October 1, 2003. The official name of company was changed to TMEIC Corporation on April 1, 2024.

== Products ==
- Processing Board
- Control Board
- Uninterruptible power supply
- Power Converter Devices
- Drive Equipment
- Large Capacity Motors and Generators
- Motor for Metal Rolling Mill
- Wind Power Generator
- Ozone Gas Generating System
- Ozone Water Producing System
- Steel plant automation
- Photovoltaic Inverters

== Locations ==
=== Japan ===
- Head Office (Tokyo)
- Fuchu Works (Fuchu)
- Keihin Works (Yokohama)
- Kobe Works (Kobe)
- Nagasaki Works (Nagasaki)

=== Overseas Affiliated Companies ===
- TMEIC Corporation Americas (Roanoke, VA, United States; Branch: Houston Factory: Katy)
- TMEIC Sistemas Industriais da America do Sul Ltda (São Paulo, Brazil)
- TMEIC Europe Limited. (Middlesex, United Kingdom. Branch: Bari, Italy)
- TMEIC International Corporation (Istanbul, Turkey)
- Toshiba Mitsubishi-Electric Industrial Systems (China) Corporation (Beijing, China. Branch: Shanghai)
- Shanghai Bao-ling Electric Control Equipment Co., Ltd. (Shanghai, China)
- Guangzhou Toshiba Baiyun Ryoki Power Electronics Co., Ltd. (Guangzhou, China)
- TMEIC Asia Company Limited (Hong Kong. Branches: Singapore; Taiwan)
- TMEIC Industrial Systems India Private Limited (Hyderabad, Telangana India. Branch: Mumbai, Pune, Gurgaon, Bangalore, Chennai)
- TMEIC Power Electronics Systems India Private Limited, (Bangalore, India)
- TMEIC Process Technology Application Center, Ltd (Melbourne, Australia)
