= Renewable portfolio standard =

Policy requiring a minimum of electricity sources be zero-emissions

A renewable portfolio standard (RPS) is a regulation that requires the increased production of energy from renewable energy sources, such as wind, solar, biomass, and geothermal. Other common names for the same concept include Renewable Electricity Standard (RES) at the United States federal level and Renewables Obligation in the UK.

The RPS mechanism places an obligation on electricity supply companies to produce a specified fraction of their electricity from renewable energy sources. Certified renewable energy generators earn certificates for every unit of electricity they produce and can sell these along with their electricity to supply companies. Supply companies then pass the certificates to some form of regulatory body to demonstrate their compliance with their regulatory obligations. RPS can rely on the private market for its implementation. In jurisdictions such as California, minimum RPS requirements are legislated. California Senate Bill 350 passed in October 2015 requires retail sellers and publicly owned utilities to procure 50 percent of their electricity from eligible renewable energy resources by 2030. RPS programs tend to allow more price competition between different types of renewable energy, but can be limited in competition through eligibility and multipliers for RPS programs. Those supporting the adoption of RPS mechanisms claim that market implementation will result in competition, efficiency, and innovation that will deliver renewable energy at the lowest possible cost, allowing renewable energy to compete with cheaper fossil fuel energy sources. Since 2013, the levelized cost of electricity from wind energy has dropped below that of all fossil fuels, followed in 2015 by solar energy.

RPS-type mechanisms have been adopted in several countries, including the United Kingdom, Italy, Poland, Sweden, Belgium, and Chile, as well as in 29 of 50 U.S. states, and the District of Columbia.

== Policy by country ==
=== Australia ===
Renewable Energy (Electricity) Act 2000 (Cth)

=== China ===
China adopted a renewable energy target in 2006 and modified it in 2009 to the following targets:

- Renewable electricity – 500 GW by 2020 (300 from hydro, 150 from wind, 30 from biomass, and 20 from solar PV)
- Renewable energy – 15% by 2020 (15% non-fossil fuel, which includes nuclear)

=== European Union ===
The European Union passed the Directive on Electricity Production from Renewable Energy Sources in 2001 and expanded it in 2007 to the following EU-wide targets (although member states are free to pass more aggressive targets):

- Renewable electricity – 33% by 2020
- Renewable energy – 20% by 2020

==== Germany ====
The German Renewable Energy Act, since its adoption in 2000, is producing strong growth in renewable power capacity by encouraging private investors through guaranteed Feed-in tariffs. Germany adopted targets more aggressive than the EU mandated targets in September 2010:

- Renewable electricity – 35% by 2020 and 80% by 2050
- Renewable energy – 18% by 2020, 30% by 2030, and 60% by 2050

=== Japan ===
Based on the 1997 Act on the Promotion of New Energy Usage, 118 million KWh was targeted in 2012 (METI).

=== Republic of Korea ===
The Republic of Korea adopted the Act on the Promotion of the Development, Use, and Diffusion of New and Renewable Energy since 2012.

=== United Kingdom ===
The Renewables Obligation (RO) is designed to encourage generation of electricity from eligible renewable sources in the United Kingdom. It was introduced in England and Wales and in a different form (the Renewables Obligation (Scotland)) in Scotland in April 2002 and in Northern Ireland in April 2005, replacing the Non-Fossil Fuel Obligation which operated from 1990.

The RO places an obligation on licensed electricity suppliers in the United Kingdom to source an increasing proportion of electricity from renewable sources, similar to a renewable portfolio standard. In 2010/11 it is 11.1% (4.0% in Northern Ireland). This figure was initially set at 3% for the period 2002/03 and under current political commitments rose to 15.4% (6.3% in Northern Ireland) by the period 2015/16 and then it runs until 2037 (2033 in Northern Ireland). The extension of the scheme from 2027 to 2037 was declared on 1 April 2010 and is detailed in the National Renewable Energy Action Plan. Since its introduction the RO has more than tripled the level of eligible renewable electricity generation (from 1.8% of total UK supply to 7.0% in 2010).

=== United States ===
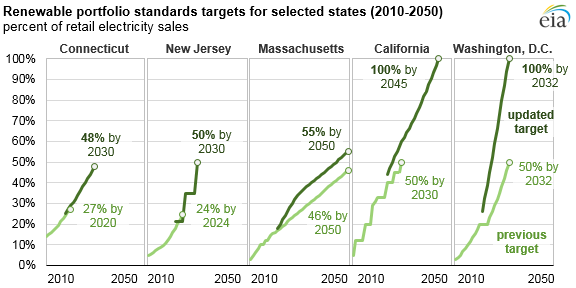
Selected state renewable portfolio standards with 2018 revisions. 29 states have adopted policies targeting a percentage of their energy to come from renewable sources.

The Public Utility Regulatory Policies Act is a law, passed in 1978 by the United States Congress as part of the National Energy Act. It was meant to promote greater use of renewable energy, mostly through feed-in tariffs, but contains little language declaring explicit renewable energy objectives or quotas.

In 2009, the US Congress considered Federal level RPS requirements. The American Clean Energy and Security Act reported out of committee in July by the Senate Committee on Energy & Natural Resources includes a Renewable Electricity Standard that called for 3% of U.S. electrical generation to come from non-hydro renewables by 2013, but the full Senate did not pass the bill.

Different state RPS programs issue a different number of Renewable Energy Credits depending on the generation technology; for example, solar generation counts for twice as much as other renewable sources in Michigan and Virginia.

The Lawrence Berkeley National Laboratory claims that RPS requirements were responsible for 60% of the total increase in American renewable electricity generation since the year 2000. However, the LBNL also reports that RPSs' role has been declining in recent years, from 71% of the annual American renewables builds in 2013, to 46% just two years later, in 2015.
