= Richard Cousins =

British businessman (1959–2017)

- Born: 29 March 1959; Leeds, England
- Died: 31 December 2017 (aged 58); Cowan, New South Wales, Australia
- Education: University of Sheffield; Lancaster University Management School
- Occupation: Businessman
- Spouse: Caroline Thorpe (1982–2015)
- Children: 2 (both deceased)

Richard John Cousins (29 March 1959 – 31 December 2017) was a British businessman, and the chief executive officer of the world's largest foodservice company, the Compass Group, based in Chertsey, Surrey.

== Early life ==
Richard Cousins was born on 29 March 1959 in Leeds. He was the son of Marian and Philip Cousins.

Cousins was educated at The Brakenhale School, a comprehensive school in Bracknell, Berkshire. He earned a bachelor's degree in mathematics from the University of Sheffield in 1980, followed by a master's degree in operational research from Lancaster University Management School.

== Career ==
Cousins began in the group operational research department of Cadbury-Schweppes in 1981, being involved in market research and investment projects. In 1984 he joined BTR Industries, again in operational research. He became corporate planning manager for Newey and Eyre (now part of Hagemeyer UK), one of its subsidiaries and an electrical components firm. In 1990 he moved to BPB plc, the British firm which is the world's largest manufacturer of plasterboard and now owned by the French company Saint-Gobain. He went on to be managing director of Abertay Paper Sacks in 1996, President and CEO of Westroc Inc in February 1998 and Group chief executive of BPB in April 2000.

Cousins joined Compass in May 2006 as CEO. In 2017, Cousins was named #11 on the 2017 100 Best Performing CEOs in the World by Harvard Business Review; in 2016 he placed 17. He is succeeded as CEO of Compass by Dominic Blakemore. Originally planned for 1 April 2018, the succession was brought forward to 1 January 2018.

== Personal life ==
Cousins married Caroline Thorpe in 1982; she died of cancer in 2015. Their two sons were William and Edward, both of whom died with their father. They resided in the Chilterns and Tooting, South London. The couple had previously lived at Wellington, Shropshire late in the 1980s, where Cousins was a player in the Cricket Club, of which he remained for some time chairman of the club committee.

== Death ==
Cousins was killed on 31 December 2017 when the light aircraft he was on crashed into the Hawkesbury River in Australia near Cowan, north of Sydney. His two sons, William Cousins (25) and Edward Cousins (23), his fiancée Emma Bowden (48) and her daughter Heather Bowden-Page (11) as well as pilot Gareth Morgan, were also killed in the accident. Emma Bowden was the daughter of Gerald Bowden, the former Conservative Member of Parliament for Dulwich. Cousins, a keen cricket fan, was to attend the Fifth Test of the Ashes series in Sydney with his two sons; the seats were left empty.

A year before his death, Cousins changed his will to include a "common tragedy clause", so that if he and his children were to die at the same time, the bulk of his fortune would go to charity. This resulted in the charity Oxfam receiving a £41 million bequest from his estate.

== See also ==
- Agustín Escobar

Business positions
Preceded by Mike Bailey	Chief Executive of Compass Group; May 2006 – December 2017	Succeeded by Dominic Blakemore
