= Michael Bailey =

Michael or Mike Bailey may refer to:

== Sports ==
- Mike Bailey (footballer) (1942–2026), English footballer
- Michael Bailey (swimmer) (born 1948), British Olympic swimmer
- Michael Bailey (cricketer) (born 1954), English cricketer
- Michael Bailey (Canadian football) (born 1982), Canadian former player in the Canadian Football League

== Other fields ==
- Michael Buckworth Bailey (1827–1899), British Anglican missionary to Japan
- Michael Bailey (businessman) (born 1948), British businessman; CEO of Compass Group
- Mike Bailey (weatherman), (1949–2021) Australian radio presenter and politician
- Michael Bailey (environmentalist) (born 1954), Canadian environmentalist; early member of Greenpeace Foundation
- J. Michael Bailey (born 1957), American psychologist, researcher of sexual orientation
- Mike Bailey (actor) (born 1988), English actor
- Michael G. Bailey, American attorney from Arizona
- Michael Bailey (editor) (born 1979), American writer and editor
- Mike Bailey (wrestler), a ring name of Canadian professional wrestler Émile Charles Baillargeon-Laberge (born 1990)

== Fictional characters ==
- Michael Bailey (Coronation Street), a fictional character from British soap opera Coronation Street
