= Peter R. Harris =

Peter R. Harris was formerly the CEO of the UK and Ireland, Middle East and Africa division of Compass Group before being dismissed in October 2005 for "improper conduct" in relation to practices with the United Nations procurement department. Although no documentation suggests any link between Compass Group or its subsidiary Eurest Support Services (ESS) (sometimes referred to as Eurest or Eurest Support Services, or even ESS Support Services Worldwide) to the Oil-for-Food Programme scandal, Fox News in particular alleged questionable conduct by Harris.

Fox News has been the most aggressive media outlet in pursuing the alleged corruption by Compass Group. They have reproduced a number of internal ESS documents which demonstrate possible illicit behavior on the part of ESS executives, U.N. officials and brokers.

In March 2006, Compass competitor Switzerland-based Supreme Foodservices AG filed a complaint/writ in the U.S. District Court, Southern District of New York, in relation to the allegations, although no additional information other than that previously published by Fox News appeared in the claim. Harris is named amongst the defendants. Another lawsuit was then filed by another Compass competitor, Es-Ko, citing specifically the possible involvement of Compass Group's CEO Michael Bailey.

Harris led ESS in a number of business deals. Among these have been contracts with BP for integrated facility management services in the Americas and the Caribbean in 2005 and with ChevronTexaco for catering and facilities management worldwide in 2002 for ten years.

Harris worked in South Africa for ten years. He met his wife there and had three children in the country. In 2004, the Compass Group South Africa website said that he planned to retire there.

== Sources ==
- Chevron homepage
- Compass Group
- Interim UN report
- Timesonline
