= Ruby Tuesday =

Ruby Tuesday may refer to:

- "Ruby Tuesday" (song), a 1967 song by the Rolling Stones
- Ruby Tuesday (restaurant), American multinational foodservice retailer and franchise
