= Newey and Eyre =

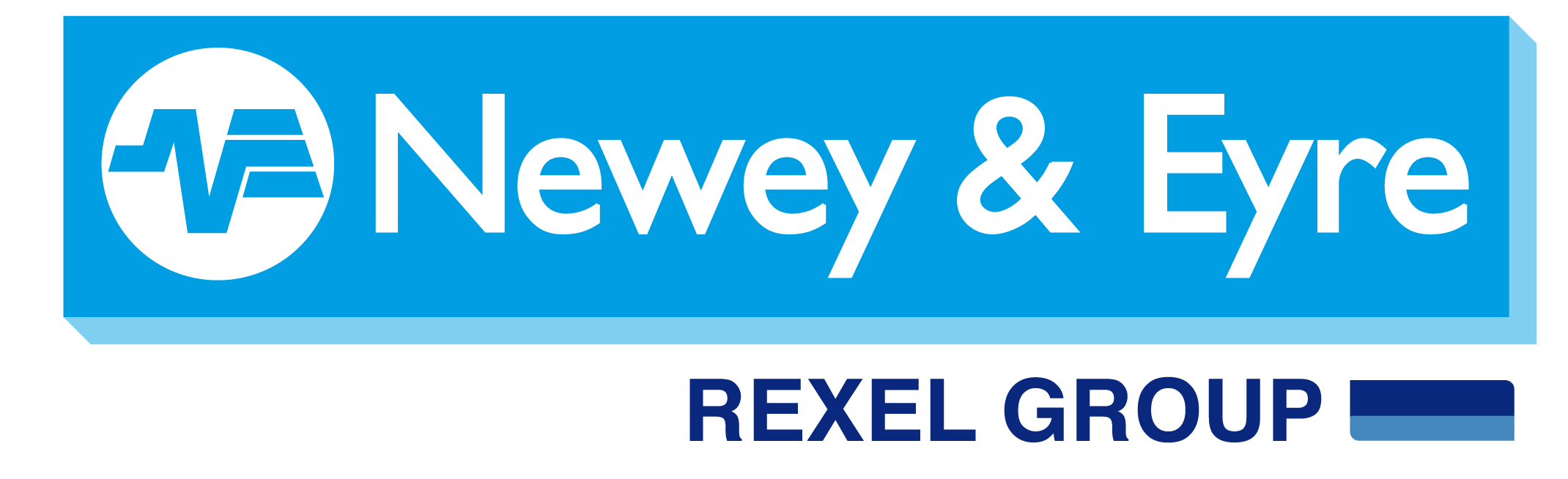
- Industry: Trade, Maintenance & electrical
- Headquarters: Luke Wayland, West Midlands
- Key people: Edgar Aponte- Rexel UK CEO Marcus Leek - Rexel UK CFO
- Products: Wiring, cable, HVAC, cable management, luminaries, circuit protection, sockets, Hand Tools, Fixings and Accessories, Lighting, LED, Safety and Workwear,
- Revenue: £630m GBP (2019)
- Number of employees: 2,135 (2019)
- Website: rexel.co.uk

Newey and Eyre was an electrical wholesaling company based in the United Kingdom. Founded in 1926, the company is now part of Rexel.

== History ==
Established in 1926, Newey & Eyre has been an electrical wholesale organisation for the duration of its existence. Over the years, the business has been acquired by a number of different holding company but has remained relatively unchanged by the corporate mergers.

In 1993, investor group Hagemeyer acquired Newey & Eyre Group Ltd from Invensys PLC, and, in 2008, Newey and Eyre was acquired by Rexel.

In 2009, Newey and Eyre launched an online store, Neweys Online.

Newey & Eyre operates in the United Kingdom through a national network of nearly 130 branches with a profiled stock range of more than 32,000 different lines. Another 140,000 products are available either from stock or to special order. Newey and Eyre also hold a range of over 3,500 branded products called Newlec.

Newey and Eyre's head office is based in Birmingham, West Midlands at Eagle Court.

In 2008, Newey & Eyre opened the capital's first dedicated facilities management centre.

Newey & Eyre rebranded to Rexel as part of the One Rexel transformation program in 2016.
