= Morrison's Cafeteria =

Southeastern US restaurant chain

Morrison's Cafeterias was a chain of cafeteria-style restaurants, located in the Southeastern United States with a concentration of locations in Georgia and Florida. Generally found in shopping malls, Morrison's primary competition was Piccadilly Cafeterias. It was especially popular in Florida, with its high proportion of retirees. At its peak, the company was a symbol of good Southern cooking and operated 151 restaurants under the Morrison's name in 13 states.

The company began as a single cafeteria opened in 1920 in Mobile, Alabama by J. A. Morrison. Morrison helped develop the cafeteria dining concept, which was unique at the time and would later become characteristic of the Southern United States. More than 100 food items were prepared "homemade" daily. By 1950, the company had 17 locations in Mississippi, Alabama, Louisiana, Georgia, Tennessee, and Florida, with the majority of them in Florida.

Morrison's opened 151 cafeterias across the Southeast over the next two decades, eventually becoming the nation's largest cafeteria chain. After winning a contract to cater to the cast and crew of the film The Greatest Show on Earth, Morrison's branched out into catering contracts for schools, including state universities such as Florida State University in Tallahassee, Stetson University in DeLand, corporate dining facilities, and hospitals.

Its effort to diversify into non-dining businesses in the 1960s was less successful, and those enterprises were sold off in the early 1980s by new management. In 1982, Morrison's acquired the 15-unit Ruby Tuesday chain. It used this acquisition to launch other casual dining concepts, such as L&N Seafood Grill, Silver Spoon Café, Mozzarella's, and Tia's Tex-Mex. It also acquired three other food-contract firms.

By the mid-1990s, the new restaurant concepts — particularly Ruby Tuesday — were doing far better than the original cafeteria chain, as customers' expectations and tastes had changed. Because of this, Morrison's decided to split the company into three new firms: Morrison's Fresh Cooking, the cafeteria chain; Ruby Tuesday, Inc., which also included the other casual dining concepts; and Morrison Health Care, which took over the food contracts for hospitals (the educational and business contracts had been previously sold to a competitor). Morrison Health Care is now part of Compass Group.

In 1998, Morrison's Fresh Cooking, unable to withstand the general decline in popularity of cafeterias, was sold to Piccadilly Cafeterias. Piccadilly has since closed numerous former Morrison's locations outside of Florida and Georgia.

Piccadilly went through Chapter 11 bankruptcy proceedings in 2012. As of April 2024, the company operates one location in Alabama. However, several locations remain in Georgia (the Metropolitan Atlanta area).
