= Alexander Yakovlev (diplomat) =

Russian United Nations official

Alexander Yakovlev is a former diplomat. He was a long-serving tenured member of the United Nations procurement department who was involved in the Oil-for-Food Programme scandal and had other allegations of impropriety.

== Diplomat activity ==
Yakovlev worked in the UN Secretariat starting in 1985. In 1993, Yakovlev signed a permanent contract with the UN as a private individual (without secondment by the Russian Federation).

Yakovlev resigned on June 23, 2005. On August 8, 2005, United Nations Secretary-General Kofi Annan waived Yakovlev's diplomatic immunity upon a request from the U.S. Attorney's Office, and Yakovlev was apparently taken into custody, according to Mark Malloch Brown, Annan's chief of staff. Yakovlev's case (1:2005-cr-00819) was assigned to the Southern District of New York.

The same day, he pleaded guilty to wire fraud under the Oil-for-Food Programme, making him the first UN official to face criminal charges in connection with the scandal-tainted operation. He was released under bond of $400,000.

Yakovlev also pleaded guilty in federal court to charges of wire fraud and money laundering for accepting hundreds of thousands of dollars in bribes from UN contractors in his work outside oil-for-food. He could have faced up to 20 years in prison for each of the three counts. His Brooklyn-based criminal lawyer Arkady L. Bukh said it could take several years until Yakovlev was sentenced. On December 22, 2010 he was sentenced to time served, two years of supervised release, and was ordered to forfeit $900,000.

== Controversies ==
The diplomat was accused by the investigators of taking nearly $1 million in bribes, which also includes alleged illicit dealings with Compass Group PLC's subsidiary Eurest Support Services (ESS) and its terminated CEO Peter R. Harris and senior executive Andy Seiwert.

Yakovlev is alleged to have conducted himself improperly in 1996 when he indirectly tried to get bribes from Société Générale de Surveillance S.A.
