= Ian Meakins =

British businessman (born 1956)

- Born: Ian Keith Meakins; 31 August 1956 (age 70)
- Education: St Catharine's College, University of Cambridge
- Occupation: Businessman
- Years active: 1977–present
- Title: CEO, Wolseley plc
- Term: 2009–present
- Predecessor: Chip Hornsby
- Successor: Incumbent
- Children: 3

Ian Keith Meakins (born 31 August 1956) is a British businessman. He was the chief executive of Wolseley plc, a British multinational building materials distribution company, from 2009 to 2016. He is the chairman of Unilever since December 2023, chairman of Compass Group since December 2020, and former chairman of Rexel.

== Early life ==
He was educated at St Catharine's College, University of Cambridge.

== Career ==
From 1978 to 1985, Meakins was a brand manager with Procter & Gamble, from 1985 to 1988, a senior manager with Bain & Company, and from 1988 to 1991 a Founding Partner at Kalchas Group (management consulting). From 1992 to 2004, Meakins was with Diageo plc, rising to President of European Major Markets and Global Supply. He was CEO of Alliance UniChem plc until its merger with Boots in July 2006. Meakins later was chief executive of Travelex Holdings Ltd.

Meakins was CEO of Wolseley plc from 13 July 2009 to August 2016, when he was succeeded by John Martin.

Meakins is also director of the Impetus Trust, and a non-executive director of Centrica plc.

Meakins replaced Paul S. Walsh as chairman of Compass Group in December 2020. He also chairs the board of Unilever since December 2023. He was the chairman of Rexel until August 2023.

== Personal life ==
Meakins is married, with three children.
