= Specialty Restaurant Group =

Specialty Restaurant Group, LLC.
- Company type: Private
- Founded: 2000; 25 years ago
- Headquarters: Maryville, Tennessee, United States
- Key people: James CarMichael (CEO)

Specialty Restaurant Group, LLC. (SRG) is a privately owned restaurant company, headquartered in Maryville, Tennessee, USA, that has, at one time or another, owned and operated four casual dining restaurant chains, including The American Café, Silver Spoon Café, the now defunct L&N Seafood Grill, and Tia's Tex-Mex. At one time, SRG controlled and operated more than 40 restaurants—all of which operated under its various nameplates.

Specialty Restaurant Group was created in 2000, when a group of investors bought the four restaurant chains from Ruby Tuesday. The investors, who were former employees of Ruby Tuesday, included the company's current CEO, James CarMichael, who is credited with having led the buyout from Ruby Tuesday. The American Café, Silver Spoon Café, L&N Seafood Grill, and Tia's Tex-Mex restaurants already existed before their new parent company was created. Similar to Ruby Tuesday, Applebee's, O'Charley's and Outback Steakhouse, SRG's restaurant concepts operate or operated in the casual dining industry.

Beginning at the time of the divestiture, the company continued to maintain its relationship with Ruby Tuesday, and operated its corporate headquarters inside the Ruby Tuesday worldwide headquarters.

In 2004, SRG divested its Tia's Tex-Mex restaurant concept and all of the existing Tia's locations to Maplewood Partners, LP.

== January 2007 closings ==
On January 2, 2007, SRG suddenly closed 20 of its remaining restaurants. The restaurant closings included eighteen American Café restaurants, one Silver Spoon Café restaurant, and the only remaining L&N Seafood Grill restaurant. In the same week, the company ended its seven-year relationship with Ruby Tuesday, relocating its corporate headquarters from the Ruby Tuesday office in which it has previously leased space.

Several of the sites on which the now-closed restaurants operated had been subleased from Ruby Tuesday. In a January 5, 2007 interview with Knoxville News Sentinel, Rick Johnson, senior vice president of Ruby Tuesday, indicated that he was aware of the closing but that Ruby Tuesday had "no immediate plans for space leased by SRG." After asked what his reaction was to the Tallahassee, Florida store closing, the then General Manager of that store Michael Stepp responded he would now have more time to lower his golf handicap in preparation for the Nationwide Tour. Another one of the managers at the Jacksonville Landing, Florida store, Allan Delrosario, expressed his shock as well to the surprising news because he was expecting for SRG to expand its restaurant operation in Las Vegas.

== Bankruptcy ==
On February 20, 2007, Specialty Restaurant Group filed for Chapter 11 bankruptcy reorganization in U.S. Bankruptcy Court for the northern district of Texas. The company's bankruptcy filings indicate that SRG owes millions of dollars to a variety of creditors across the United States, including former parent-company, Ruby Tuesday.

"SRG's debts include a $11.2 million bank loan, a $2.5 million debt to the Internal Revenue Service and $700,725 to Ruby Tuesday. In its filing, SRG lists assets of between $10 million and $50 million and a similar range of debts."

In a February 2007 letter to the company's creditors, SRG CEO James CarMichael stated: "This decision was not an easy one to make but based on the advice of our legal counsel and financial advisers, it is the right decision for the company and its employees."

In early 2007, Ruby Tuesday indicated in an SEC filing that it had learned that SRG had defaulted or was late at least once in rent payments for 17 restaurants that had been sub-leased by SRG from Ruby Tuesday. As a result, Ruby Tuesday anticipated taking a charge related to these 17 restaurants, although the company expects the actual charge to be "substantially less" than the $6.1 million remaining in scheduled payments for the various leases.
