= Morrison Management Specialists =

- Type: Private
- Industry: Foodservice
- Founded: 1920 in Mobile, Alabama
- Founder: James Arthur Morrison; George Cabel Outlaw
- Headquarters: 400 Northridge Road Suite 600; Sandy Springs, Georgia, U.S.
- Area served: Nationwide
- Key people: Tim Pierce - Morrison Healthcare (CEO); Scott MacLellan - Morrison Community Living & Touchpoint Support Services (CEO)
- Number of employees: 18,000 (2012)

Morrison Management Specialists, a member of the Compass Group, is a foodservice company headquartered in Atlanta, Georgia that provides food, nutrition, and dining services to healthcare and senior living communities through its two operating divisions: Morrison Healthcare Food Services and Morrison Senior Living. The company has more than 1,200 registered dietitians, 450 executive chefs, and 18,000 foodservice workers, as well as approximately 15,000 client employees who are managed by Morrison. The company serves more than 900 hospitals, integrated healthcare systems, and senior living communities throughout the United States.In 2011, Morrison Management Specialist divided into three sectors, under its parent company Compass Group (Morrison Healthcare, Morrison Senior Living, Touchpoint Support Services).

== History ==
Morrison's Cafeteria was founded in 1920 in Mobile, Alabama by James Arthur Morrison and George Cabel Outlaw.

=== Timeline ===
- 1950s – Morrison took on its first contract food service job, catering for the set of the movie The Greatest Show on Earth. Morrison obtained contracts to cater for Loyola University New Orleans, Mound Park Hospital in Florida, and Candler General Hospital in Georgia.
- 1988 – Morrison had around 700 accounts in the Business and Industry, Education, and Healthcare fields.
- 1990 – Business and Industry and the Education divisions of Morrison were sold, leaving Morrison with approximately 300 healthcare accounts, which became Morrison Health Care.
- 1992 – Morrison Inc. was renamed Morrison Restaurants Inc. to reflect the shift in importance of their restaurant division.
- 1996 – Morrison Restaurants Inc. officially split into three separate companies: Ruby Tuesday Inc., Morrison Fresh Cooking Inc., and Morrison Health Care Inc.
- 1998 – Morrison Senior Living founded as a division of Morrison. It consists of the acquisitions of Drake Management and Culinary Services Network.
- 1999 – Morrison Health Care officially became Morrison Management Specialists.
- 2001 – Compass Group purchases Morrison Management Specialists.
- 2011 - Morrison Management Specialist was divided into three sectors, under its parent company Compass Group (Morrison Healthcare, Morrison Senior Living, Touchpoint Support Services)
