= Cosa Liebermann =

Swiss trading company

- Company type: Private
- Industry: International trade
- Founded: 1912 (as Liebermann-Wälchli & Co. AG)
- Founders: Johann Wälchli; Ernst Liebermann
- Defunct: 1999
- Fate: Acquired by Hagemeyer
- Headquarters: Switzerland
- Area served: Asia, Europe
- Key people: Claude Barbey; Stephan Schmidheiny
- Products: Textiles, sporting goods, consumer goods

Cosa Liebermann was a Swiss trading company specializing in commerce between the Far East and Europe. The company was founded in 1912 in Japan as Liebermann-Wälchli & Co. AG and existed until its acquisition by the Dutch trading company Hagemeyer in 1999.

== History ==
Johann Wälchli and Ernst Liebermann founded Liebermann-Wälchli & Co. AG in Japan in 1912. The firm specialized in trade with the Far East.

In 1988, the company merged with Übersee-Handel AG (UHAG), which had been founded in 1927 by Julius Müller, to form Cosa Liebermann (Cosa standing for Commerce d'outre-mer SA, meaning Overseas Trading Corporation). The same year, the newly formed company acquired the German sporting goods manufacturer Puma.

In 1990, Claude Barbey and his family sold Cosa Liebermann to Anova, owned by Stephan Schmidheiny. From 1994, the company was jointly owned by the Dutch trading company Hagemeyer, which held a 50% stake. At the end of 1999, Hagemeyer acquired all remaining shares from Anova, resulting in complete absorption of the company.

== Operations ==
Prior to its complete absorption, the consortium was one of the major import and export companies operating between the Far East and Europe. Cosa Liebermann maintained offices in Asia, including in Hong Kong, the Philippines, and Thailand. The company represented Swiss firms such as Sulzer and Rieter, operated trading houses in Europe and Switzerland (including Lacorey in Geneva), and held the general representation in Switzerland for various consumer goods. The company's activities included the import of textiles and other products.

== Bibliography ==
- Übersee-Handel AG, 1977
- Bilanz, no 11, 1988
- Schweizerische Handelszeitung, no 36, 1994
