= Dominic Blakemore =

British businessman (born 1969)

Dominic William Blakemore
- Born: June 14, 1969 (age 57)
- Occupation: businessman
- Title: CEO, Compass Group
- Term: 2018-
- Predecessor: Richard Cousins

Dominic William Blakemore (born 14 June 1969), is a British businessman, the chief executive (CEO) of Compass Group. Originally due to take up the post on 1 April 2018, the appointment was brought forward following the death of the CEO Richard Cousins in a plane crash in Australia on 31 December 2017.

Yahoo News listed his annual compensation as totalling £4.7 million in 2019.

In 2019 he succeeded outgoing Chair of the Audit Committee, Paul Heiden and joined London Stock Exchange Group Board.

He trained at PricewaterhouseCoopers, then worked for Cadbury's from 2004 to 2006, then Iglo Foods (now known as Nomad Foods), rising to chief financial officer.

Blakemore joined Compass Group in April 2012 as finance director. He was appointed chief operating officer on 1 December 2015 and stepped down as finance director the same day. On 1 October 2017 he was appointed deputy CEO.

Blakemore was a non-executive director of Shire plc between January 2014 and April 2018 and a member of the academic council of University College London (a university he graduated from in 1991). He was appointed a director of London Stock Exchange Group in January 2020.

He attended Queen Mary's Grammar School and holds an undergraduate degree from University College London and is a member of the Institute of Chartered Accountants in England and Wales. He is a member of the Council of University College London.

Blakemore is married and has two sons.
