= Cenikor Foundation =

American drug rehabilitation non-profit organization

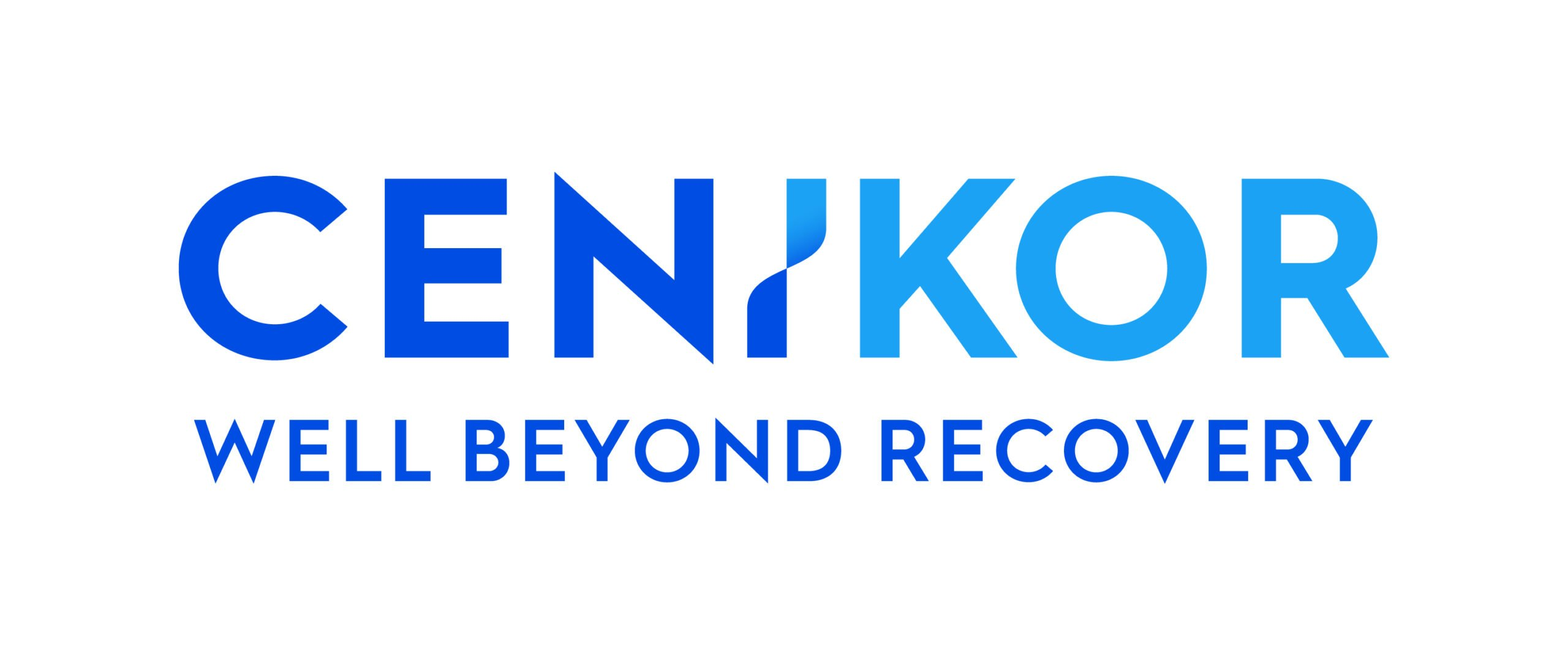
- Type: Non-profit
- Industry: Behavioral Health, Addiction Treatment, Long Term Care Facility
- Founded: Lakewood, Colorado, U.S. (1967)
- Headquarters: Houston, Texas
- Number of locations: 14 facilities (2025)
- Area served: Texas and New Mexico
- Key people: Bill Bailey (President and CEO) Kellee Webb (Chief of Staff) Matt Kuhlman (CFO)
- Services: Detoxification; Medication Assisted Treatment; Inpatient Residential; Partial Hospitalization; Outpatient; Aftercare; Recovery Housing
- Revenue: 21,514,981 United States dollar (2017)
- Total assets: 46,211,968 United States dollar (2022)
- Number of employees: 300 (estimate)
- Website: www.cenikor.org

The Cenikor Foundation is a nonprofit organization dedicated to providing drug rehabilitation and mental health services. Headquartered in Houston, Texas, Cenikor operates residential treatment centers and outpatient programs for adults and adolescents in Texas and New Mexico. Initially focused on the therapeutic community model, Cenikor now offers a range of services including detoxification, medically assisted therapies, short-term residential treatment, and outpatient care.

== History ==
=== 1960s ===
Cenikor was founded in 1967 by James "Luke" Austin while he was incarcerated at the Colorado State Penitentiary. Austin had previously worked at the new religious movement Synanon in California, and initially sought to start a Synanon spinoff group for Colorado prisoners. When his request to start a group under the Synanon name was rejected by prison leaders, Austin renamed the group Center of the Core of the Individual, shortened to "Cenikor," and reframed Synanon's confrontational attack therapy approach as reality therapy. The first Cenikor facility was established in a former Denver, Colorado bakery, supported by a donation from businessman Charles Kettering III.

=== 1970s ===
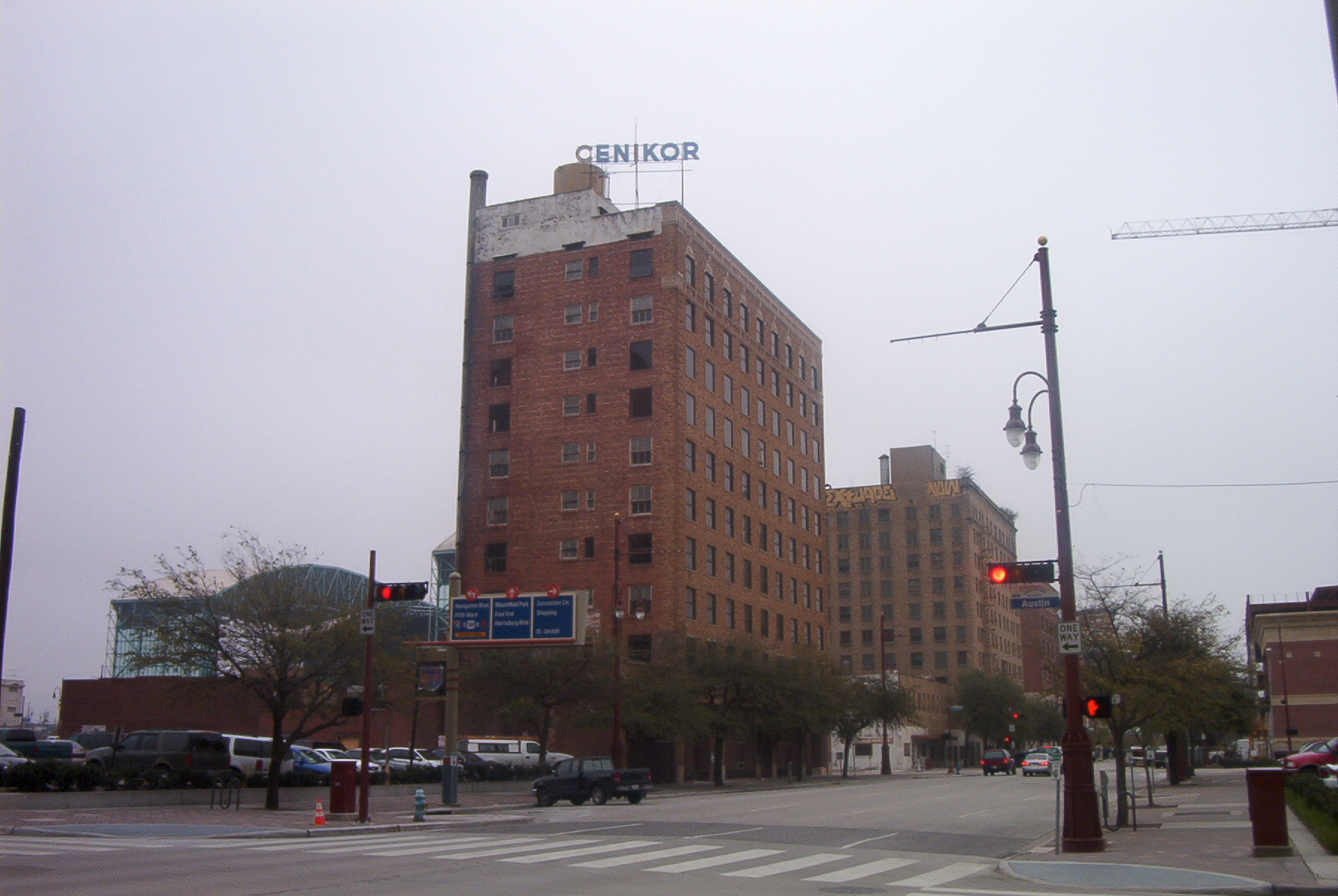
William Penn Hotel in downtown Houston

In 1972, Cenikor relocated to Houston, Texas, experiencing significant growth fueled by private philanthropy. The Houston facility initially operated at 1101 Elder Street in the Jefferson Davis Hospital before moving to the William Penn Hotel in the late 1970s. A partnership with the Astrodomain Corporation in 1977 created the Cenikor Astrodome Task Force, providing work experience for patients and contributing to a significant portion of the organization's budget. A substantial donation from Winn-Dixie Stores Inc. in 1979 enabled the establishment of a North Texas facility in Fort Worth.

After an investigation by the IRS, Houston district attorney, and a state senator found that the Austins had been misappropriating funds, Luke and Dottie Austin were fired in 1977. Board members Ken Barun, Doug Sadbury, and Edward Fresquez took over leadership of the organization. In July 1978, Luke Austin and several other individuals, including his mother Helen Thompson, were arrested for attempting a violent takeover of Cenikor's Houston and Denver facilities.

=== 1980s ===
Cenikor received national recognition in 1983 following a visit from President Ronald Reagan to the Houston facility. President Reagan commended Cenikor's success in operating without government funding and securing private sector support. First Lady Nancy Reagan also visited Cenikor facilities, demonstrating support for the organization's mission during the national anti-drug campaign.

=== 1990s ===
In 1994, Cenikor's Houston facility moved to a larger location in Deer Park. The organization further expanded its reach in 1995 by opening an outreach office in Baton Rouge, Louisiana, providing referrals to Texas facilities.

=== 2012-present ===
Between 2012 and 2022, the foundation opened new facilities in Waco (2012), Tyler (2015), Austin (2016), Corpus Christi (2018), Amarillo (2019), and Farmington, New Mexico (2022).

The foundation partnered with Charlie's Place Recovery Center in Corpus Christi in 2018 and opened Amarillo Recovery from Alcohol and Drugs (ARAD) in 2019. In 2023, Cenikor was recognition as one of the largest Houston-area nonprofits.

== Controversy ==
In 2019, an investigation by Reveal from the Center for Investigative Reporting, (affiliated to NPR and Public Radio Exchange) reported on coercive and dubious practices (including physical and psychological abuse) in conflict with Cenikor stated rehabilitating mission, including patients being assigned to perform physically demanding unfree labour for major companies including Exxon, Shell, and Walmart. Reveal reported that "tens of thousands" of patient-workers have worked without pay in Cenikor programs, and that this practice has resulted in nearly two dozen serious on-the-job injuries and a 1995 death. Following the report's release, state officials in Texas and Louisiana launched multiple probes into Cenikor's operations. In addition, the Compass Group and others who had employed Cenikor patients as low wage labor ended their contracts with Cenikor.

== Leadership ==
- James "Luke" Austin - Founder, 1967
- Bill Bailey, appointed President and CEO in 2004, and the first non-graduate to lead Cenikor.

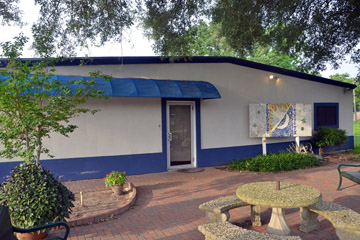
Odyssey House Texas, Houston, TX facility
