= Tia's Tex-Mex =

Restaurant information
- Closed: 2006
- Food type: Tex-Mex
- Location: Texas, United States

Tia's Tex-Mex was a chain of Tex-Mex themed casual dining restaurants founded in Lubbock, Texas in the 1970s that grew to encompass 25 locations in 7 states, half of which were located in Texas. Owned for several years by Ruby Tuesday, the chain was sold in 2000 to Specialty Restaurant Group and again in 2004 to Maplewood Partners before declaring Chapter 7 bankruptcy in 2006.

== See also ==
- List of Tex-Mex restaurants
