= Sonepar =

French distribution company

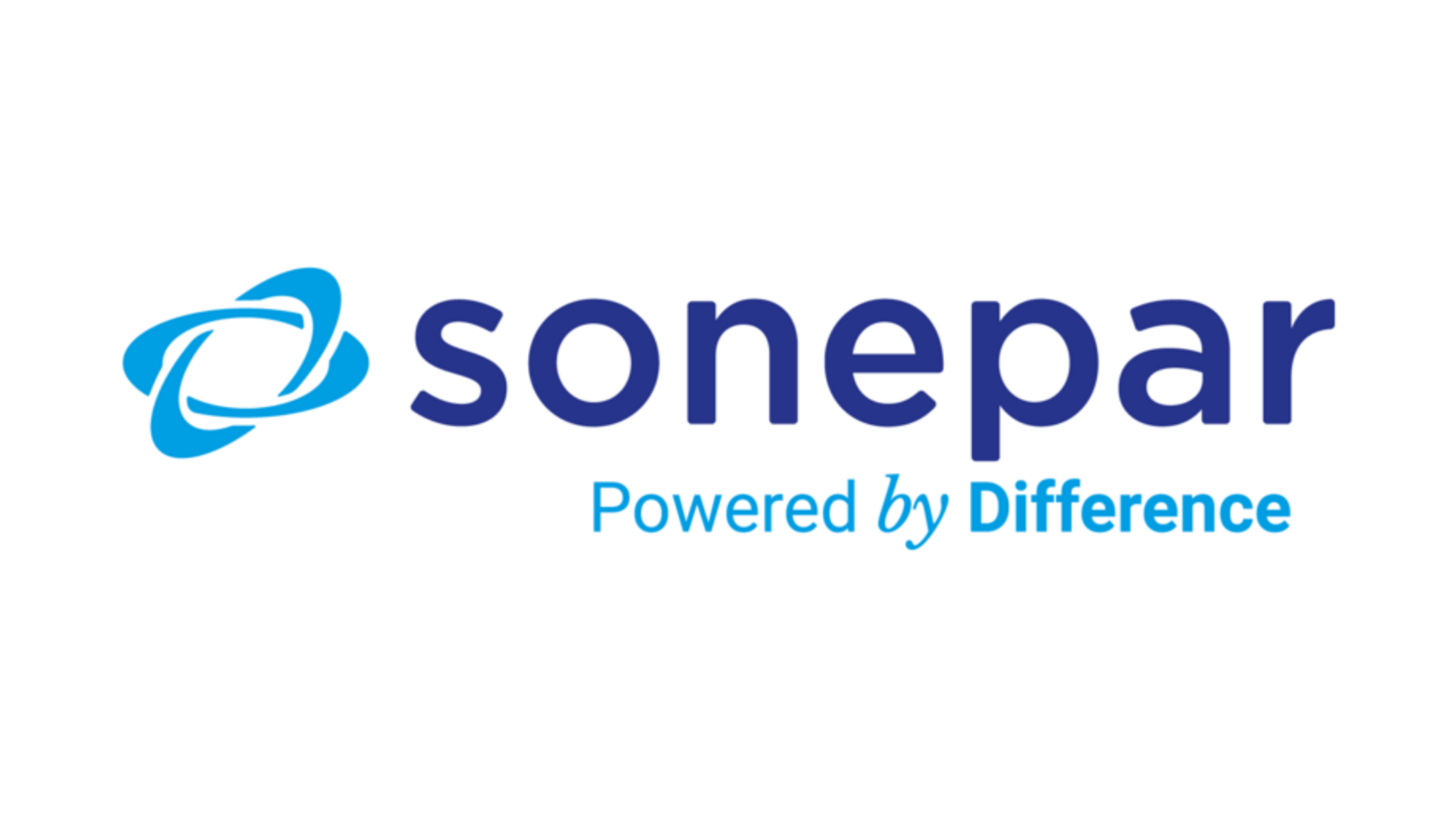
- Type: Private
- Industry: Distribution B2B
- Founded: 1969
- Headquarters: Paris, France
- Area served: Worldwide
- Key people: Philippe Delpech (President and CEO)
- Products: Electrical products and services
- Revenue: ▲€ 33.6 billion (2025)
- Website: www.sonepar.com

Sonepar (French: Société de Négoce et de Participation) is an independent electrical products distribution company headquartered in Paris, France. Operating in 40 countries, the group was founded in 1969 and made 33.6 billion euros in sales in 2025.

== History ==
Sonepar was founded in France in 1969 by the Coisne and Lambert families. Their first foray into electrical components was the acquisition of Comptoir d'Électricité Franco-Belge (CEFB), which sparked a series of similar acquisitions throughout the 1970s. In the 1980s, the company grew worldwide with acquisitions in the Netherlands (Technische Unie), Germany (Otto Kuhmann) and Canada (Lumen in Québec). The family holding Colam Entreprendre, owner of Sonepar and syndicating inheriting descendants of the Coisne and Lambert families, was created in 2000.

Development in the USA was announced as soon as 1986, but really started in 1998 with the acquisition of Boston's Eagle Electric. It was followed by a spree of small and medium acquisitions, building step-by-step Sonepar's US-based distribution network. By 2004, Sonepar USA reached $1 billion in sales. Sonepar's acquisition of Hagemeyer in 2007 significantly increased the group's presence in North America and Asia-Pacific. In 2009, Sonepar became the leading electrical components distribution company worldwide, and during the following years the USA became Sonepar's number one market.

== Activities ==
Sonepar is a multinational company specialized in the distribution of electrical products and services, operating in 40 countries. The group is headquartered in Paris, France and made €33.6 billion in sales in 2025. In the USA, Sonepar is headquartered in Charleston, South Carolina. The USA is the group's largest market with $16.5 billion in sales in 2025.

Named a 2025 Industry Titan by Modern Distribution Management magazine, Sonepar provides support for new construction and maintenance, repair and operations (MRO) of data centers. The company is establishing data center solutions hubs in key markets throughout the U.S.

== Governance ==
- 1998-2024: Marie-Christine Coisne-Roquette
- Since 2024: Philippe Delpech
