= Eurest Support Services =

Subsidiary of Compass Group

- Type: Subsidiary
- Industry: Catering, Facilities management, Remote site services
- Founded: 1941
- Headquarters: United Kingdom
- Area served: Worldwide
- Services: Large-scale food service; remote site catering; facilities management for military, security, mining, oil & gas, and construction sectors
- Parent: Compass Group

Eurest Support Services (ESS) is a subsidiary of the catering company Compass Group PLC specializing in harsh-environment large-scale food service and facilities management. Its primary clients are military forces and other security services, major defense contractors, and construction, mining, and oil exploration and production facilities worldwide.

ESS first came to wide public light in 2005 after being embroiled in the multibillion-dollar United Nations procurement scandal. It was reported that ESS used a broker company in New York City to get United Nations procurement contracts in West Africa with the help of a corrupt U.N. official, Alexander Yakovlev.

Separately, it was also the subject of a public hearing in 2007 by the United States House of Representatives Committee on Oversight and Government Reform for its role in security contract arrangements for its staff and equipment while providing dining services to the US Army in Iraq as a subcontractor to Halliburton subsidiary Kellogg Brown & Root (KBR).

== U.N. corruption ==
News reports in 2005 described a multimillion-dollar contract to provide food to U.N. peacekeepers in West Africa awarded to ESS days after Andy Seiwert, a senior executive at ESS, allegedly received confidential bid information. At the time U.N. officials estimated the total value of ESS food contracts with the United Nations in West Africa at $237 million, with renewals and add-ons that could reach $351 million.

Attached to the e-mail were commercially sensitive U.N. documents that no one outside of highly restricted circles within the U.N. was supposed to have access to; and that the contracts committee itself would not ponder for five more days.

- The first document was a draft of the official recommendation by the UN procurement department that a $62 million contract for U.N. peacekeepers in Liberia be awarded to Eurest Support Services.
- The second document was a detailed United Nations evaluation of the technical abilities of 12 different food supply firms to meet U.N. requirements for feeding separate UN peacekeeping missions.
- The third document was a detailed list of the price bids, that three of the five firms had submitted for the UN contract. The document showed that ESS had bested its nearest rival, a food services firm known as ES-KO, by literally pennies per ration unit, and had also underbid its competitors in virtually every other service category.

Such information is considered top-secret by the United Nations, and is submitted in a sealed-bid process that U.N. officials have touted as foolproof.

ESS's business development executive Andy Seiwert had a vital interest in it. Siewert was the ESS/Compass executive described by sources close to the U.N. as having the most frequent day-to-day contact with the scandal-plagued UN procurement department. That contact included frequent meetings with Alexander Yakovlev.

Alexander Yakovlev pleaded guilty to charges of corruption, wire fraud and money-laundering. Vladimir Kuznetsov Head of the U.N. Committee for Administrative and Budgetary Issues was also arrested and indicted after taking nearly $1 million in bribes from the Compass Group.

Competitors ES-KO and Supreme Food Services AG initiated lawsuits claiming violation of the Racketeer Influenced and Corrupt Organizations (RICO) Act, the Sherman Antitrust Act and New York State's Donnelly Act regulating free trade. Compass settled the claims and said that the total legal, professional and related costs associated with investigation, litigation and settlement was below £40 million although they did not admit legal liability. Federal investigations were announced to be underway and the case was referred to the UK Serious Fraud Office.

== Iraq and Kuwait contracting ==
As preparations for the invasion of Iraq were being made in early 2003, and continuing through 2006, ESS was contracted by the U.S. Marine Corps, the 82nd Airborne Division, the British Ministry of Defence, the Coalition Provisional Authority, and major defense contractors Fluor, RMS, Bechtel, and most notably KBR, a subsidiary of Halliburton under the U.S. Army troop support contract called LOGCAP III to provide dining and construction services at desert bases and encampments in Kuwait and Iraq. ESS, through its office in Kuwait, bid for, was awarded, and built and operated ten dining facilities in Kuwait and later thirteen facilities throughout Iraq, and routinely served meals to 50,000 U.S. and other Coalition service members each day. Over 100 Western managers and 1,500 Indian workers staffed the dining facilities, some open 24 hours per day, and lived in harsh conditions inside the camps for months at a time.

=== 2004 Fallujah ambush ===
On March 31, 2004, four Blackwater security contractors were killed in an ambush in Fallujah, a city west of Baghdad, while protecting an ESS convoy en route to a Fluor construction site elsewhere. It has been widely but erroneously reported that the convoy attacked had been destined for a KBR location. That prompted a further contention that the contract between ESS and Blackwater for Iraq road transport and personnel close protection security, through a joint venture business formed by Blackwater and Regency Hotels of Kuwait, was known to Halliburton and therefore violated Halliburton's contract with the U.S. Army.

== Sources ==
- Compass Group’s bid rigging scheme
- Lawsuit from competitor ES-KO
- Lawsuit from competitor Supreme Foodservices AG
- The stolen secret documents
