= Michael Bailey (environmentalist) =

Canadian conservationist, public speaker and documentary producer

- Born: 1954 (age 71–72); Vancouver, British Columbia
- Occupations: Conservationist, public speaker and documentary producer
- Years active: 1975–present
- Known for: Environmental activism

Michael Bailey, described as "one of the foremost eco-warriors of our times" according to Rex Weyler, is a founding member of Greenpeace, along with Paul Watson, Patrick Moore, David McTaggart and others. He supervised the original Greenpeace flagship, Rainbow Warrior.

== The Climate Summit ==
Presently serving as operations director for The Climate Summit, which uses interactive videoconferencing technologies provided by Cisco. Bailey conducts presentations and educates people on the growing issue of climate change and global warming. He is an authorized presenter of The Climate Project founded by Al Gore, who trained Bailey in the art of presentations pertaining to climate issues, ocean acidification and greenhouse gas emissions.

== Anti-whale hunt campaigning ==
As a conservationist and adventure program producer, he retains a special interest in Cetacea. Bailey joined Greenpeace in 1975 and volunteered to pilot a Zodiac inflatable boat in front of a Russian harpoon ship, resulting in iconic images of the whalers firing 90 mm harpoon cannons at activists that were to establish Greenpeace in the public consciousness. These actions earned him the nickname "Zodiac Mike" or "Generalissimo".

Bailey has played a major part in the raising of public opinion and government support against the whaling industry and as an official observer at the International Whaling Commission.

== Kuwait wildlife campaign ==
Featured on the cover of a National Geographic magazine, Earthtrust was the first environmental organization to enter Kuwait after the 1991 Gulf War, with Michael Bailey and Rick Thorpe assessing the environmental damage cause by the burning in Kuwait oil fields of Kuwait. They subsequently formed the Kuwait Environmental Information Center and deployed oil barriers to protect wetlands and took action resulting in the fires being extinguished more quickly. This was memorialized in the internationally broadcast Earthtrust documentary Hell on Earth and a five-part Canadian Broadcasting Corporation mini-series.

== Food campaigns ==
Bailey has also campaigned against food irradiation and was a director of the Conservation Council of Hawai'i.

== Other accomplishments ==
In 2005, he was awarded the Anuenue Award by the Conservation Council of Hawaii for being the 'volunteer of the year' for his dedication to "creating a better world for wildlife and future generations" by documenting plastic pollution, campaigning to protect the Arctic from oil drilling and for working with indigenous peoples such as the Gwich'in and Inupiaq; including organizing the Arctic Film Festival.

== Filmography ==
- Oil on Ice International Documentary Association’s 2004 Pare Lorentz Award for Democratic Sensibility and Activist Spirit. A Sierra Club Production
- ‘Great Adventures’ 1999- 2005. Producer, on-camera Host about mountaineering expeditions to the Antarctica.
- 'Wild Rescues' for Animal Planet TV Series.
- 'Effective Microorganisms' weekly television series

== Biography ==
- The Greenpeace story by Michael Harold Brown, Prentice-Hall (University of Michigan) Canada, 1989
- Men and Whales by Richard Ellis. Robert Hale, (University of Virginia) 1992

== See also ==
- Conservation movement
- Environmentalism
- Environmental movement
- Dolphin drive hunting
