= Ruby Tuesday (restaurant) =

American multinational foodservice retailer

Ruby Tuesday Operations LLC.
- Trade name: Ruby Tuesday Inc.
- Type: Private
- Industry: Restaurant
- Genre: Casual dining
- Founded: February 19, 1972; 54 years ago Knoxville, Tennessee, United States
- Founder: Samuel E. Beall III
- Headquarters: 333 East Broadway; Maryville, Tennessee, 37804; United States
- Number of locations: 187 (2026)
- Area served: Worldwide
- Key people: Shawn Lederman (CEO)
- Products: American cuisine (burgers • chicken • pasta • ribs • salad bar • seafood • soup • steak)
- Owner: NRD Capital
- Website: rubytuesday.com

Ruby Tuesday Inc. is an American multinational foodservice retailer that owns, operates, and franchises Ruby Tuesday restaurants. The concept was started in 1972 by Samuel E. (Sandy) Beall III.

The corporation was formed in 1996 as a reincorporation of Morrison Restaurants Inc. It is headquartered in Maryville, Tennessee, and has 209 locations worldwide after closing 185 locations following the COVID-19 pandemic.

Its flagship brand is an American cuisine casual dining restaurant chain with locations throughout the United States aside from the Pacific Coast states. Its greatest density of sites is along the eastern coast of the United States (aside from Boston) as it closed several locations in the Great Basin and Great Plains regions, including Chicago, in recent years. In 2016, Ruby Tuesday sold the Lime Fresh Mexican Grill rights to an undisclosed buyer to refocus on the main Ruby Tuesday brand. The company has closed all locations of Wok Hay and Marlin and Ray's. Additionally, it holds development rights to Truffles Grill.

On June 6, 2012, founder and CEO Sandy Beall announced he would leave the company. In October 2017, it announced that NRD Capital Management (owners of Frisch's Big Boy and Fuzzy's Taco Shop at the time) would be taking the company private through a $146 million deal in early 2018.

The company filed for Chapter 11 bankruptcy on October 7, 2020, stating it will permanently close 185 restaurants that had been shut down during the COVID-19 pandemic. After the closures, the company would have 236 company-owned and operated locations and an undisclosed number of sites run by ten franchisee groups. Ruby Tuesday emerged from bankruptcy on February 24, 2021, with 209 restaurants, having closed more restaurants than initially planned. As of 2026, 187 locations remain in operation.

== History ==
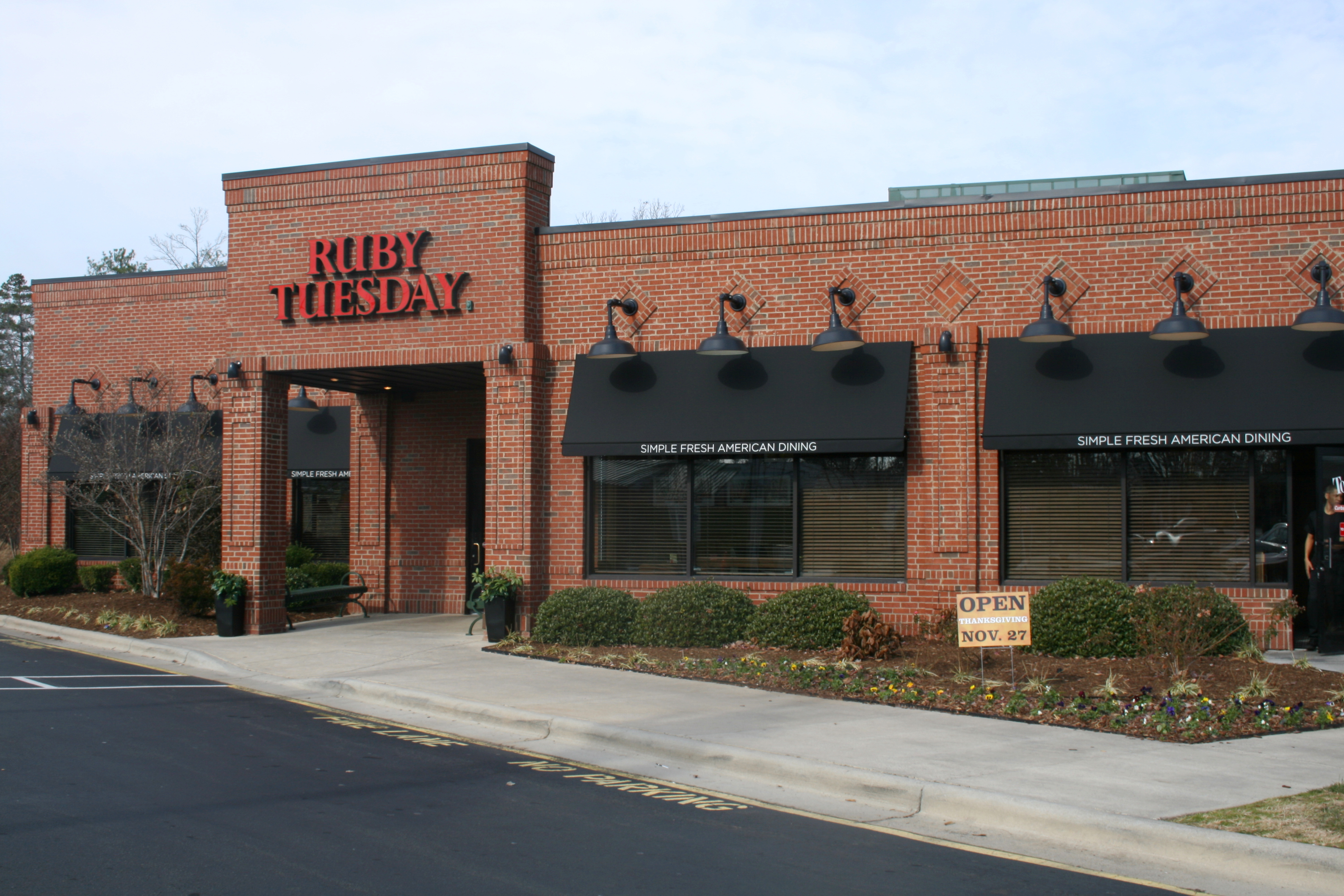
A Ruby Tuesday restaurant in Durham, North Carolina, August 2008. This location closed in March 2020.

Ruby Tuesday was born out of a $10,000 endowment Sandy Beall had received from a friend and operator of several Pizza Huts to open his own restaurant. Beall took the name from The Rolling Stones song "Ruby Tuesday", after a suggestion by one of several fraternity brothers who were co-investors. With that money, and another $10,000 put together with four of his University of Tennessee fraternity brothers, the first Ruby Tuesday restaurant was opened in 1972. The location was adjacent to the university's Knoxville campus, and although the building still stands, the restaurant has since closed.

Over the next decade, a new location opened about every nine months. In April 1982, Beall sold the expanded 16-unit Ruby Tuesday chain to Morrison Inc. for $15 million in cash and stock. The sale provided the rapidly growing restaurant chain with additional financial support. It also saw Sandy Beall become president of a newly formed Specialty Restaurant Division spearheaded by Ruby Tuesday. By 1985, the chain had grown to operate 35 locations and was a significant contributor to the renewed success of Morrison's.

Morrison Inc. was renamed Morrison Restaurants Inc. in 1992 to reflect the importance of its restaurant investments. Additionally, the company realigned its dining division with a new name, the Ruby Tuesday Group. That same year, Beall was named CEO of Morrison Restaurants Inc. On March 9, 1996, the shareholders of Morrison's approved distribution and dissolved Morrison Restaurants Inc. into three separate companies: Ruby Tuesday Inc., Morrison Health Care Inc., and Morrison's Fresh Cooking Inc.

Ruby Tuesday Inc. became the legal successor to Morrison Restaurants Inc. and was incorporated in Mobile, Alabama. At the time of the distribution, Ruby Tuesday Inc. operated many other restaurant brands in addition to their flagship Ruby Tuesday brand, including L&N Seafood Grill, Mozzarella's Café, Silver Spoon Café, and Tia's Tex-Mex. In November 2000, Ruby Tuesday Inc. completed the sale of all restaurant brands (except Ruby Tuesday) to Specialty Restaurant Group, LLC. This divestiture allowed Ruby Tuesday to concentrate exclusively on the growth and development of its namesake brand. On April 12, 2007, Ruby Tuesday Inc. changed its NYSE ticker symbol from RI to RT.

On October 7, 2020, Ruby Tuesday filed for Chapter 11 Bankruptcy protection.

=== Restaurant themes ===
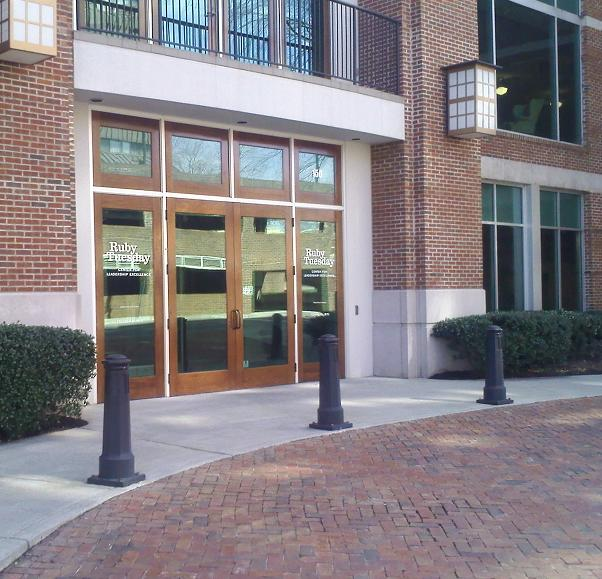
The main entrance of Ruby Tuesday Inc. headquarters in Maryville, Tennessee, February 2012

In August 2007, Ruby Tuesday Inc. ventured back into other concepts with their newly acquired Asian dining restaurant, Wok Hay. The company proceeded to convert the concept from self-service to full-service dining. In October 2008, a second location was opened in a former Ruby Tuesday restaurant building. The company's 2011 Annual Report noted an additional franchised Wok Hay restaurant in Trinidad, bringing the emerging chain to three operating restaurants.

In September 2010, Ruby Tuesday Inc. continued its venture into other concepts with an agreement to license the Lime Fresh Mexican Grill brand. Earlier the same year, Ruby Tuesday also acquired the development rights to Truffles Grill and introduced their home-grown Marlin & Ray's Seafood & Sunsets concept. As of 2011, the company was researching conversion of poorly performing Ruby Tuesday restaurants into some of these concepts. An excerpt from the 2011 Annual Report:

As of May 31, 2011, we owned and operated one Marlin & Ray’s, one Truffles, and two Wok Hay restaurants. We are currently evaluating the conversion of certain lower performing Ruby Tuesday concept restaurants to these concepts. We currently anticipate converting approximately six to eight company-owned Ruby Tuesday concept restaurants to the Marlin & Ray’s, Truffles, or Wok Hay concepts in fiscal 2012. Additionally, we anticipate opening one to two new restaurants and approximately seven to nine smaller, inline Lime restaurants in the fiscal year 2012.

The company has also experimented with the conversion with the Alabama-based Jim 'N Nick's Bar-B-Q chain. However, a year after remodeling a Ruby Tuesday restaurant into the company's first Jim 'N Nick's, company spokeswoman Meridith Hammond indicated they would no longer explore that concept. On April 4, 2012, Ruby Tuesday Inc. announced that it had purchased fast-casual chain Lime Fresh Mexican Grill for $24 million cash. The announcement by Sandy Beall added, "John Kunkel, Lime's founder, will be joining our Board of Directors following completion of the acquisition."

In 2013, after posting a second-quarter loss of $15.1 million, or 24 cents a share, Ruby Tuesday closed 13 Marlin & Ray's restaurants and one Wok Hay location, exiting from both concepts. It also sought a buyer for its two licensed Truffles Grill restaurants and closed two company-developed Lime Fresh restaurants.

Ruby Tuesday announced plans that it would be taken private through a purchase by NRD Capital Management, a private-equity firm based in Atlanta, Georgia. The $146 million deal was finalized on December 21, 2017.

== Headquarters ==
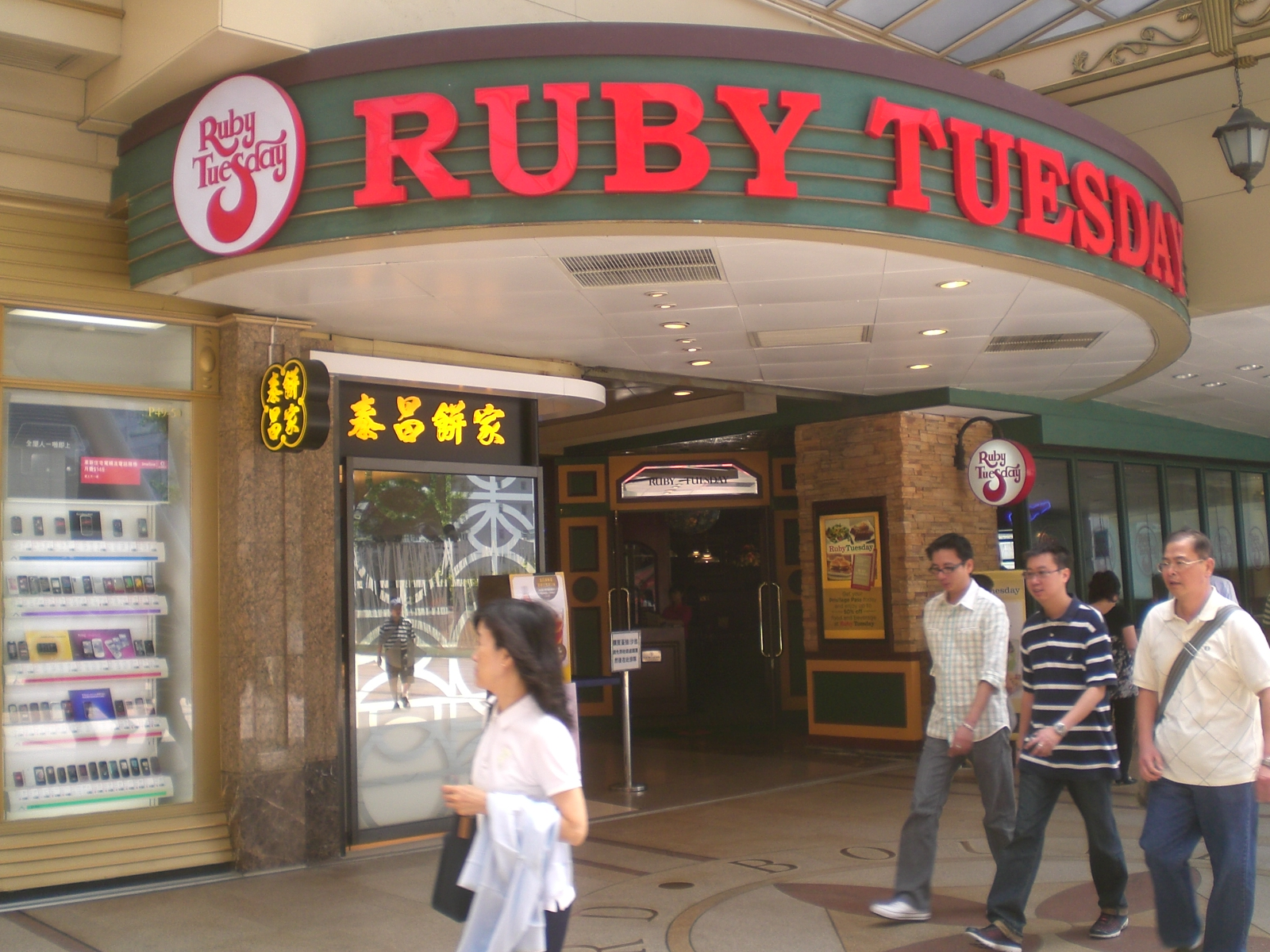
An international Ruby Tuesday in Telford Plaza, Kowloon Bay, Hong Kong, June 2009

In the summer of 1998, Ruby Tuesday relocated its main headquarters from Mobile, Alabama to Maryville, Tennessee, just 15 miles south of where the company had been founded. This location contains their Restaurant Support Center and an on-site training facility, called the Center for Leadership Excellence (formerly known as WOW-U). These facilities are used as an internal troubleshooting department, development center, test kitchen, and corporate office for the company's executives, restaurant managers, and chefs.

The company purchased a residential property at nearby Maryville College in 1997 to develop a corporate retreat, and renamed it the Ruby Tuesday (RT) Lodge. Additional guest buildings were added, and the company used the area to dine and house management during corporate training sessions.

== Distribution ==
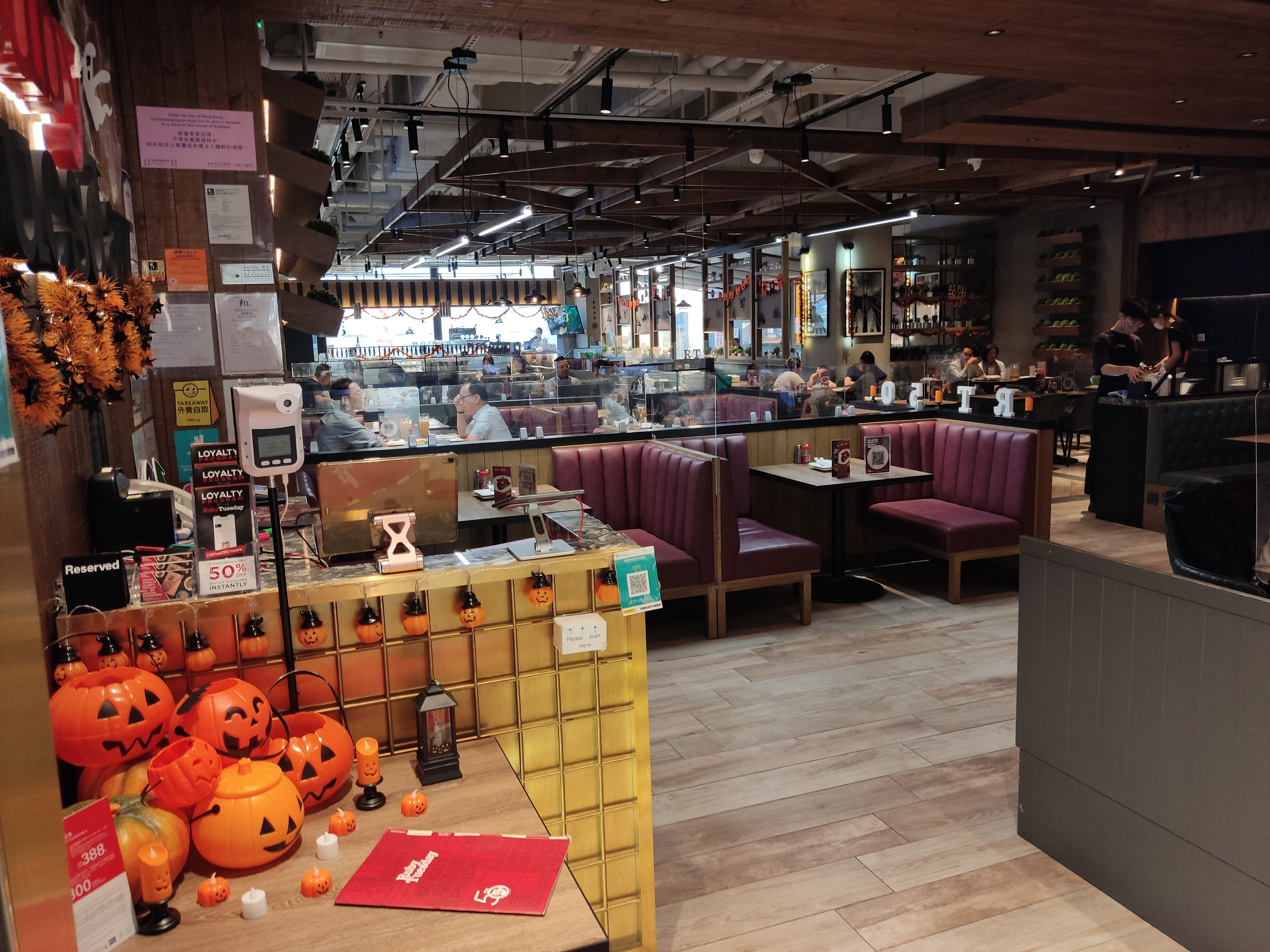
Inside of a Ruby Tuesday at Ocean Pride in Hong Kong

Throughout the first half of the company history, the chain mainly located itself in or near shopping malls. Starting in the early 1990s, the company adjusted its distribution strategy by including more freestanding locations.

As of August 13, 2019, Ruby Tuesday, Inc. has company-owned and/or franchised Ruby Tuesday brand restaurants in 43 states and 13 foreign countries. The company owned and operated 658 Ruby Tuesday restaurants, while domestic and international franchisees operated 29 and 49 restaurants, respectively. Their international locations include Canada, Chile, Egypt, El Salvador, Guam, Honduras, Hong Kong, India, Kuwait, Romania, Saudi Arabia, Trinidad and Tobago, and Panama.

== Marketing ==
For much of its history, Ruby Tuesday had little, if any, advertising. By 2002, the company found itself combating traffic and sales losses at many of its locations. This caused the company to change course and introduce coupons at selected sites. By June of the following year, Ruby Tuesday had expanded on this strategy by testing television, radio, and billboard advertising in select locations. The company also began offering a curbside carryout service originally dubbed "TueGo!"

=== New identity ===
The former Ruby Tuesday logo and slogan, used until December 2006

In 2007, the company began a series of significant changes to its brand identity. The changes were made to move the brand's customer perception out of the "bar-and-grill" segment of the casual dining industry, and were showcased in the opening of their Times Square location the same year. As part of the changes, Pentagram design studios were hired to help construct a new public visual identity for the brand. The design team created a new logo set in Clarendon, altered the standard color scheme, and created all new packaging to promote the renamed "Ruby TueGo" carryout service. Ruby Tuesday also began remodeling its entire suite of restaurants via the removal of their novelty wall artifacts, faux Tiffany lamps, and dated furnishings. The update went on to bring a new menu with higher-quality food and beverages, revamped service techniques, high-definition televisions, and a free guest-accessible Wi-Fi network.

=== "Implosion" ===
In 2008, Ruby Tuesday marketed an advertising campaign to show how radical their recent changes were. On August 5, over "live" streaming internet video, a demolition crew was supposed to implode the final "old Ruby Tuesday" to cap off the brand's commitment of change in front of a small crowd in Mount Holly, Ohio. However, to the crowd's shock, the "restaurant" next door (Cheeky's Bar and Grill, which looked like a typical casual dining chain) was demolished.

Following the events, the senior VP of marketing for Ruby Tuesday (in actuality, an actor) posted a written apology on the company's website and videotaped a formal apology that was broadcast on television. As it turned out, the idea was merely an elaborate marketing ploy to raise attention to the newly remodeled restaurants. The implosion was actually done on a miniature set staffed by a Hollywood special effects crew, and the "live" event had been pre-recorded in Harriman, Tennessee. The two films were then edited together to make it look like an accident.

=== Changes continue ===
The remodel and its accompanying changes came at an inopportune time for the chain. The Great Recession was underway, and the casual dining segment of the industry was financially suffering. To address these issues, the company debuted made-from-scratch garlic cheese biscuits, a Sunday brunch program, and a steak-and-lobster deal night. Despite all of this, financial analysts have been highly critical of the company's actions regarding the ever-changing shift in strategies.

In 2012, yet another advertising campaign was announced to analysts to boost guest perception. It included a reintroduction of television advertising and a continued shift to convert under-performing stores.

In 2014, returning to the more family friendly casual restaurant chain, Ruby Tuesday changed the employees' uniform to more colorful attire of blue jeans and shirts in a variety of colors, changing the menus to a chalkboard theme, adding more current top 100 hit songs to the internal music system and updating their logo to a more modern font style. Continuing the trend in 2015, the chain updated their dated children's menu with the addition of cheese pizza and corn dogs, more colorful plastic beverage cups, and colorful twisty straws.

To promote the more family friendly feel, the chain introduced a Kids Eat Free night on their flagship day, Tuesday. At all company owned restaurants, a child's meal is free with the purchase of an adult entree.

In August 2016, Ruby Tuesday announced that it would close 95 restaurants as sales slid.

=== Sponsorships ===
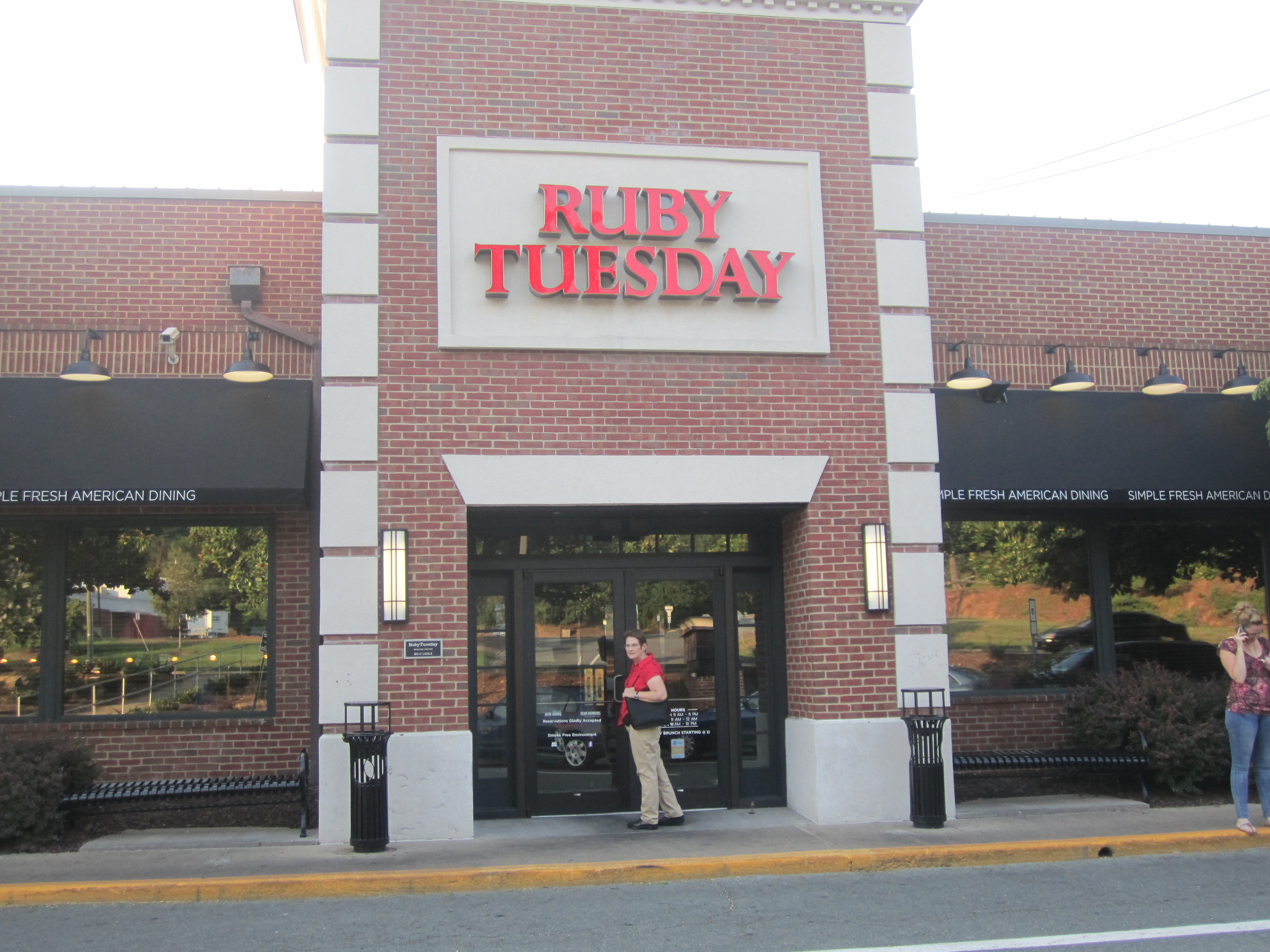
A Ruby Tuesday location near the University of Virginia campus in Charlottesville, Virginia, July 2011. This location closed on September 29, 2016, and is now subdivided into Chopt Creative Salad Co. and First Watch

From 2006 until 2009, Alex Job Racing and Ruby Tuesday partnered to form the Ruby Tuesday Championship Racing Team. The team drove the No. 23 Porsche-powered Daytona Prototype in the GRAND-AM Rolex Sports Car Series.

In 2009, Eddie Sharp Racing announced a long-term partnership agreement with Ruby Tuesday as the sponsor of the No. 2 Toyota, driven by Tim George Jr. in the ARCA Racing Series.

==== NASCAR ====
Starting with the 2010 NASCAR Nationwide Series, Ruby Tuesday has had a partnership with Penske Racing to sponsor Brad Keselowski in the No. 22 Dodge Challenger. The 2010 season saw them appear in six races, while the 2011 season saw nine races. The company was also advertised on the rear deck lid of Brad's No. 2 Dodge Charger in the 2011 NASCAR Sprint Cup Series.

Prior to the beginning of the 2011 Daytona 500, Ruby Tuesday was added as a last-minute one-race sponsor for Brian Keselowski, older brother of Brad Keselowski.

In 2012, Ruby Tuesday dropped sponsorship on Brad Keselowski's car.

== Menu ==
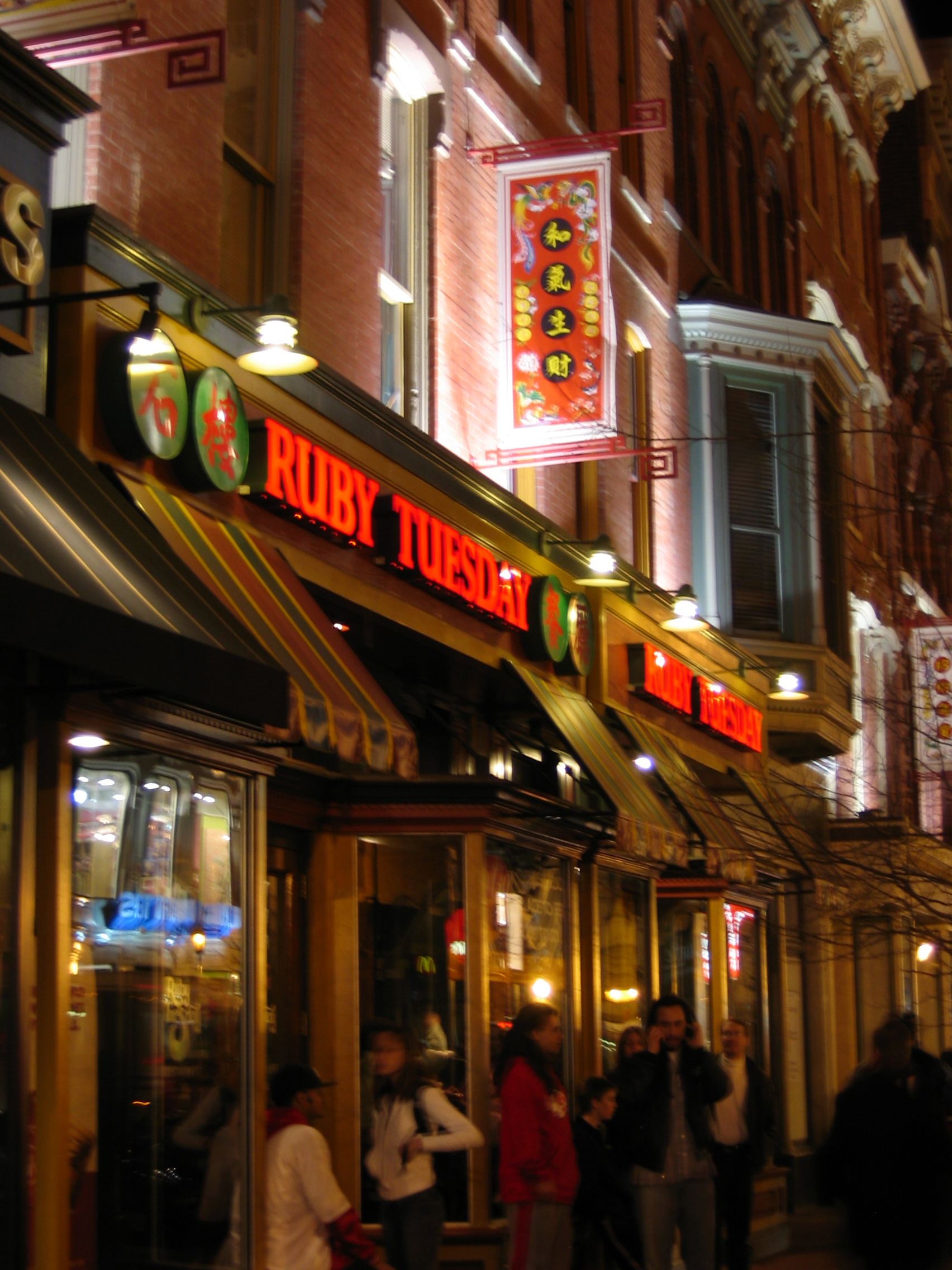
Ruby Tuesday in Washington, D.C.'s Chinatown neighborhood, January 2006. This location closed on April 24, 2013 and a portion of this space is now FroZenYo.

Ruby Tuesday offers primarily American cuisine, including all-natural chicken, pasta, pork ribs, soups, steak, and seafood. However, the brand is still commonly recognized for their salad bar and hamburgers, which have been staples to the chain since its creation. All of the restaurants also offer a full bar that serves cocktails, beer, and wine. The wine menu was most recently changed in November 2011 to introduce what the brand is calling "Cultivate Wines".

A separate menu is available for placing bulk take-out or catering orders. On January 25, 2012, the company announced their partnership with ezCater to help boost the company's catering sales.

From 2009 to 2016, Peter Glander, former sous-chef at The Modern restaurant inside the Museum of Modern Art in New York City, was the executive chef for the chain. He was responsible for the addition of the pretzel bun to their menu, along with the removal of the brand's long-standing dessert, the chocolate tallcake.

=== Dietary concerns ===
The company was the first large national casual dining chain in the country to post specific nutritional information on their menus. After initially posting this information for all menu items, they reduced the inclusion to a more subtle item-specific format, called the "Smart-Eating" section (also labeled as "Fit & Trim"). Nutritional and allergen-sensitivity information for the entire menu is available upon request.

Early 2011 saw the company revise and rewrite a portion of their drink recipes to encompass trendy "skinny" cocktails. This shift included changing drink recipes to incorporate healthier liquor and mixer alternatives and labeling the new creations with their "under 150 calories" tagline. VeeV Açaí Spirit, Absolut Berri Açaí Vodka, St-Germain elderflower liqueur, and Minute Maid Light Lemonade are the key products used in these drinks.

=== Cookbook ===
Ruby Tuesday released a cookbook by Jeff Morgan on October 25, 2011, titled Simply Fresh: Casual Dining at Home. It contains recipes that have been inspired by the menu, and even recipes that are signature to the brand.

== Restatement of financials ==
On April 11, 2005, the company and its audit committee determined the company would restate previously issued historical financial statements to properly account for leases.
