= Hagemeyer =

Business-to-business distribution company

HAGEMEYER Deutschland GmbH & Co. KG
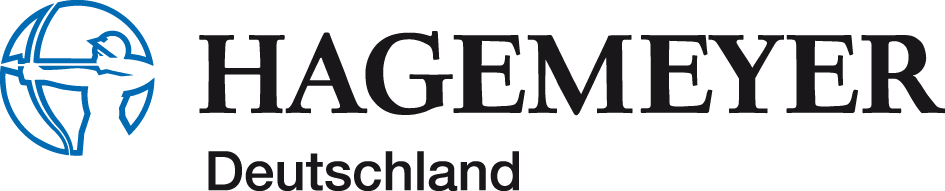

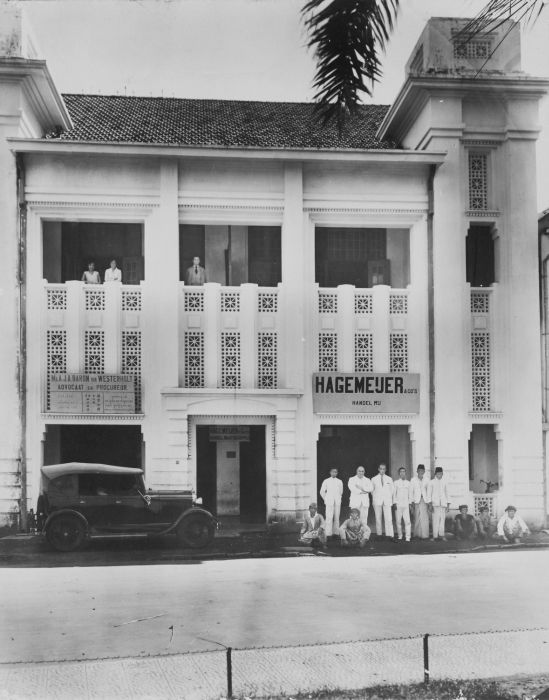
- Hagemeijer & Co's Trade Company building, between 1900 and 1940
- Industry: Distribution and services
- Predecessor: N.V. Borneo Sumatra Maatschappij
- Founded: 1905
- Fate: Acquired by Rexel
- Successor: Units divided between Rexel and Sonepar
- Headquarters: Munich, Germany
- Key people: Stephan Strauss, Tabea Götz
- Revenue: ▲€826 million (2016)
- Number of employees: 1,700 (2016)
- Parent: Rexel
- Website: www.hagemeyerce.com

Hagemeyer is a business-to-business (B2B) distribution services group focusing on the markets for electrical materials, safety and other maintenance, repair and operations (MRO) products in Europe, North America and Asia-Pacific. It was based in the Netherlands and acquired by French rival Rexel in 2008, with its units in certain countries subsequently being divested to Sonepar. Following the purchase, the Hagemeyer brand disappeared in some countries but remained in others.

== History ==
In 1994, Hagemayer acquired a 50% stake in the Swiss trading company Cosa Liebermann, and acquired all remaining shares from Anova in 1999.

In January 2004, Hagemeyer sold Elektro Fröschl electronic, its wholesale division, to Media-Saturn, thus reinforcing its focus on retail.

On 23 November 2007, the board of Hagemeyer agreed to a €3.1 billion takeover offer from larger French rival Rexel. Upon completion of the bid, some of Hagemeyer's units were then sold on to Sonepar, a privately held French company in the same sector. Sonepar had previously had its own lower bid for Hagemeyer rejected. Hagemeyer was removed from the AEX index on 7 March 2008 as Rexel declared its offer unconditional. Delisting of the firm's shares from the Amsterdam Stock Exchange took place on 21 April.

In 2010, Hagemeyer North America gets accredited to distribute its products to the aerospace industry.

== Acquisition and split ==
Following the 2007 acquisition by Rexel, the international branches of Hagemeyer became :

Controlled by Rexel

- Australia: No change
- Belgium: Breva
- Czech Republic: No change
- Estonia: Elektroskandia
- Finland: Elektroskandia
- Germany: Rexel
- Latvia: Elektroskandia
- Lithuania: Elektroskandia
- Norway: Elektroskandia
- Poland: Elektroskandia
- Russia: Elektroskandia
- Spain: Rexel
- Netherlands: Hagemeyer
- United Kingdom: Rexel

Controlled by Sonepar

- Australia: No change
- Austria: No change
- Canada: Century Vallen
- China: Hagemeyer and Elektroskandia
- Mexico: No change
- Sweden: Elektroskandia
- Switzerland: Winterhalter Fenner
- United States: No Change

== Activity ==
More than 90% of Hagemeyer's total revenue was generated by its core Professional Products and Services (PPS) business, which focused on the value-added business-to-business distribution of electrical parts and supplies, safety goods (such as hard hats and work boots) and other MRO products in some 25 countries across Europe, North America and Asia-Pacific. The remaining part of Hagemeyer's revenues was realised by its Agencies/Consumer Electronics (ACE) business, which distributes consumer electronics and branded products in the Netherlands and Australia and luxury goods in a number of countries in Asia.

In Australia, Hagemeyer was the principal distributor and marketer of home appliance and lifestyle brands such as Omega, Blanco, & De Dietrich cooking appliances along with Omega Altise seasonal products. Shriro Australia acquired Hagemeyer Brands Australia in 2011.
