= Rexel =

French company

Rexel S.A.
- Type: Public
- Traded as: Euronext Paris: RXL; CAC Next 20 component
- ISIN: FR0010451203
- Industry: Distribution of electrical supplies
- Founded: 1967 (under the name CDME: Compagnie de Distribution de Matériel Electrique)
- Headquarters: Paris, France
- Area served: Worldwide
- Key people: Guillaume Texier (CEO) Agnès Touraine (Chairwoman of the board of directors)
- Revenue: €19.414 billion (2025)
- Operating income: €1.06 billion
- Net income: €591 million (2025)
- Total assets: €14.36 billion (2025)
- Number of employees: 26,306 (2025)
- Website: rexel.com

Rexel S.A. is a French company specializing in the distribution of electrical, heating, lighting and plumbing equipment, but also in renewable energies and energy efficiency products and services.

The group has 1,876 points of sale in 17 countries and employs more than 26,306 people. Rexel is listed on the Paris Stock Exchange.

== History ==
The Rexel Group is the descendant of Compagnie de Distribution de Matériel Électrique (CDME), which was created in 1967 by Compagnie Lebon. CDME was the result of the merger of four companies: Revimex, Facen, Sotel and Lienard-Soval. It specialized in electrical equipment sales and grew in France through the acquisition of regional family businesses. In 1978, the company launched a professional electronic and computer equipment distribution branch and diversified into the industrial supplies business.

Beginning in the 1980s, CDME began its expansion into European and international markets by setting up in Cyprus, Saudi Arabia, Portugal, Benelux, West Germany, Singapore and Canada.

In 1983, CDME joined the unlisted securities market of the Paris Stock Exchange. The company then held more than 20% of the market share in France and 6% worldwide. In 1986, it began doing business in the United States. At that time, it had 350 points of sale, 65 of which were abroad. In 1987, Compagnie Française de l'Afrique Occidentale (CFAO) became the main shareholder of CDME (68%).

=== Rexel Group ===
The Pinault Group acquired CDME in December 1990 and became its main shareholder. The electrical equipment distribution subsidiary accounted for 38% of the Pinault Group's total sales. CDME was then the leading distributor of electrical equipment in France (30% market share), Belgium and Portugal.

In June 1993, CDME joined forces with Groupelec Distribution. That is when the group took on the name Rexel.

In the 1990s, the group continued to strengthen its business in France, Europe and the United States. The company re-centered its operations on the distribution of electrical equipment. In 1988, it had sold most of its professional electronics distribution interests and in 1994 it separated from its subsidiary GDFI, France's largest distributor of industrial supplies.

The group's subsidiaries gradually adopted the Rexel brand identity abroad. Willcox and Gibbs in the United States became Rexel Inc. in 1995; Rexel Italia was born in 2000 from the merger of 10 Italian subsidiaries; and the first joint venture was formed in China under the name Rexel Hailongxing.

=== Evolution of the group ===
The PPR (Pinault-Printemps-Redoute) Group announced the sale of Rexel, which was finalized on March 16, 2005, with the Ray Investment consortium acquiring shares in the company. The consortium members included Clayton, Dubilier & Rice, Eurazeo and Merrill Lynch Global Private Equity. Rexel was de-listed from the Paris Stock Exchange on April 25, 2005. The Rexel Group continued refocusing on its core business. It disposed of certain assets while embarking on a series of acquisitions. In addition to the 29 small and medium-sized acquisitions it made over the period, in 2006 the group bought the American distribution subsidiary of General Electric, GE Supply, which it renamed Gexpro. That moved Rexel into the number one position in North America and Asia-Pacific. Gexpro reinforced the group's provision of services to major industrial accounts.

In 2007, Rexel teamed up with the Sonepar Group to make a joint offer to purchase the Hagemeyer Group which was then number 3 worldwide. In 2007, Rexel changed its legal status to become a French public limited company (société anonyme) with a management board and supervisory board. The company was listed on the Paris stock exchange on April 4, 2007 on the Euronext market. In March 2008, Rexel acquired the majority of Hagemeyer's European assets (Elektroskandia in Scandinavia, ABM in Spain and Newey & Eyre in the United Kingdom). Following that acquisition, Rexel doubled its total sales in Europe, increased the number of points of sale by 50%, and entered the markets of five new countries (Finland, Norway and the Baltic States). Rexel was the largest or second-largest market player in Germany, Spain, United Kingdom, Norway, Sweden and Finland. In 2008, Rexel held around 9% of the world market for the distribution of professional electrical equipment. With 2,500 points of sale in 34 countries, the group was a leading player in this sector.

In 2011, the company began seeking acquisitions in emerging markets. As a result, Rexel strengthened its position in China with the acquisition of Lucky Well Zhineng and notably penetrated markets in Brazil (Nortel Suprimentos Industriais), India (Yantra Automation) and Peru (where it bought V&F Technologia, a Lima-based distributor of electrical equipment distributor). In early 2012, the group acquired the companies Delamano and Etil, becoming a leader in the Brazilian market. It also continued expanding in the United States by acquiring the independent electrical equipment distributor Platt Electric Supply and Munro Distributing Company for 115 million Euros, which bolstered its presence in the American energy efficiency market across the pond. The year 2012 also marked the start of Rudy Provoost's tenure as chairman of the management board. He succeeded Jean-Charles Pauze. The company launched the Energy in Motion project in 2012 which put customers at the heart of its strategy.

In June 2013, the group created the Rexel Foundation to harness its know-how and expertise to fight energy poverty. In 2014, the group announced it was purchasing Esabora, a software company that publishes sales and administrative management tools for electricians. In 2015, the Group strengthened its position in the multi-energy sector in France with the acquisition of Sofinther, a distributor specializing in thermal, heating and control equipment. On April 30, 2015, Rexel announced the sale of its businesses in Latin America. In January 2016, Rexel announced it was selling its interests in Poland, Slovakia and the Baltic countries to Würth.

In January 2016, the group sold its interests in Poland, Slovakia and the Baltic States to the Würth Group. In February 2016, as part of its acquisition policy, Rexel purchased Brohl & Appell, an American company specialized in industrial automation and MRO (Maintenance, Repair and Operations) services. In July 2016, Rexel changed its governance structure and separated the functions of Chairman of the Board of Directors and Chief Executive Officer. Patrick Berard was appointed Chief Executive Officer and Ian Meakins was named Chairman of the Board of Directors. In February 2017, Rexel announced a new strategic plan intended to refocus its activity on the most promising countries and market segments in order to accelerate the group's organic growth, by promoting the digital transformation of electrical equipment and hardware, including connected objects. In December 2017, the group announced it would sell its activities in South-East Asia to American Industrial Acquisition Corporation Group.

In 2020, the group parted ways with its Gexpro Services business to devote its resources to the crux of its strategy: the distribution of electrical equipment in the United States and the digital transformation of that equipment. The group reasserted its commitment to evolve toward a data-driven business model. In February 2021, the group acquired the Canadian operations of Wesco International and in March 2021 announced the acquisition of Freshmile Services, an independent charging station operator that offers monitoring services and software. The group also gained a 25% minority stake in Trace Software International, a software company specializing in electrical design. These two moves were intended to build the group's electromobility capacity.

In November, 2021, Rexel closed on the acquisition of Mayer, a major distributor of electrical products and services operating in the Eastern part of the United States. This followed their announcement in February to resume bolt-on acquisitions to strengthen positioning in the United States. The Mayer business added 68 points of sale for Rexel generating $1.2B in annual sales as of August, 2021.

Rexel turned down an offer to be acquired by QXO Inc., an American building materials company led by Brad Jacobs, for $9.6 billion in September 2024.

In May 2026, the Group acquired Revere Electrical Supply, a U.S. distributor specializing in industrial automation solutions.

In September 2026, Rexel announced the acquisition of GCG, a Chicago-based American distributor specializing in cables and connectivity solutions, for an enterprise value of approximately $1.4 billion (EUR 1.23 billion). GCG, owned by Audax Private Equity, operates 16 sites in the United States with around 950 employees and was expected to exceed $1.1 billion in revenue in 2026, with over 60% of its sales derived from high-growth segments including data centers, electrical infrastructure, networks, telecommunications, defense and public services. The deal, subject to regulatory approvals, was expected to close by the end of 2026. To finance the acquisition, Rexel planned to raise approximately EUR 500 million through an accelerated placement with institutional investors, alongside EUR 800 million in new debt.

== Activities ==
Rexel supplies equipment for the installation and use of electricity, mainly in residential, tertiary and industrial buildings. The group is also positioned on industrial infrastructure projects (mines, hydroelectric power stations, natural gas).

The products marketed by Rexel relate in particular to medium voltage electrical circuits in buildings: secure meters (general circuit breaker), current carriers (wires and cables), attachments and protections (baseboards, cable trays), as well as equipment that protects circuits (auxiliary circuit breakers, kill switches) and that connects and controls devices (sockets, contactors, switches). In addition, the group offers equipment for low voltage circuits (internet, stereos, television, telephone) and technical building management (home automation and building automation) with its own multi-protocol and multi-brand smart home solution.

The company also markets electrical appliances: lighting equipment, heating, ventilation, air conditioning, motors, telephones and audiovisual equipment and so on. In recent years, Rexel has developed low consumption solutions (lighting, high-efficiency motors) and products that use renewable energies: solar, wind, geothermal and aerothermal (heat pumps, solar water heaters, climate engineering solutions).

=== Services ===
The services marketed by the Rexel Group can be divided into 7 categories:

- Infrastructure and network services in which there is an infrastructure and network educational offer, as well as an infrastructure and network maintenance after-sales service
- Industrial process services, integrating an industrial process educational offer, an industrial process maintenance after-sales service and industrial process technical assistance
- Heating, electricity, air conditioning and ventilation services
- Lighting services
- Building outfitting and building control services including an educational outfitting and building control offer, application and building control training, and application and building control commissioning.
- Energy distribution and management services comprising an educational energy distribution and management offer, technical assistance, energy distribution and management training, and distribution training.
- Audit, pre-sales consulting and recycling and waste collection services.

=== Software ===
In 2014, the group bought Esabora, originally an e-commerce software publisher, which has become the name of a customer-oriented digital solution offering administrative, commercial and technical assistance. This Cloud-based software suite allows companies to access studies (3D blueprints, BIM), site management, personalized pricing and online purchase monitoring.

In 2021, the group launched a new application, BtoB EConnect Pro, which enables remote maintenance and diagnostics at connected sites. The group is positioned on the smart grid and smart building market.

=== Data/AI ===
The company launched a single web and data platform for all its brands, offers and customers in the United States, a region whose sales account for more than 30% of total revenue.

In September 2020, the group and four other major French companies made a joint commitment to "Hi! Paris", an interdisciplinary research and teaching center created by HEC and Institut Polytechnique de Paris dedicated to artificial intelligence and data sciences.

=== Distribution ===
The Rexel Group's sales as of December 31, 2025, totaled 19.414 billion Euros. The geographical breakdown of its revenue is as follows: Europe (48%), North America (46%), and Asia Pacific (6%).

The sales breakdown by segment is as follows: 50% for the tertiary market, 26% for the industrial market and 24% for the residential sector. The group's net income from operations amounted to 575 million Euros in 2021.

== Corporate governance ==
Since 2014, the Rexel Group has existed as a French public limited company with a board of directors. Its Board of Directors works through three specialized committees, whose composition and powers it defines: the Audit and Risks Committee, the Nominations Committee and the Remuneration Committee. It is made up of 12 members, 50% of whom are women, and 80% of whom are independent directors. In parallel, an executive committee manages the group's activities.

In 2016, the Rexel Group continued updated its governance structure by separating the functions of Chairman of the Board of Directors and Chief Executive Officer. Patrick Berard was appointed Chief Executive Officer of the Group and Ian Meakins was named Chairman of the Board of Directors.

On September 1, 2021, Guillaume Texier was appointed to succeed to Patrick Berard as Chief Executive Officer of Rexel. The Executive Committee comprises 9 members who report directly to the group's CEO. In 2023, Agnès Touraine was named Chairwoman of the Board of Directors.
