= Compass Group =

British foodservice company

Compass Group plc
- Formerly: Compass Demerger Limited (September–November 2000)
- Type: Public limited company
- Traded as: LSE: CPG; FTSE 100 Component
- Industry: Foodservice
- Founded: 1941; 85 years ago
- Headquarters: Chertsey, England, UK
- Key people: Ian Meakins (Chairman); Dominic Blakemore (CEO)
- Revenue: ▲£46.070 billion (2025)
- Operating income: ▲£2.964 billion (2025)
- Net income: ▲£1.880 billion (2025)
- Number of employees: 590,000 (September 2025)
- Website: www.compass-group.com

Compass Group plc is a British multinational contract foodservice company headquartered in Chertsey, England. It is the largest contract foodservice company in Europe, employing over 590,000 people as of September 2025. It serves meals in locations including offices and factories, schools, universities, hospitals, major sports and cultural venues, mining camps, prisons and offshore oil platforms. Compass Group is listed on the London Stock Exchange, as a constituent of the FTSE 100 Index. As of July 2025, it has one of the highest market capitalisations on the London Stock Exchange. It is also a Fortune Global 500 company.

== History ==
=== Origin ===
Compass Group has its origins in a company which was founded by Jack Bateman in 1941 as Factory Canteens Limited; subsequently, the company became known as Bateman Catering. Bateman Catering and Midland Catering were acquired by conglomerate Grand Metropolitan in 1967 and 1968 respectively and a management buy-out from Grand Metropolitan followed in 1987 when the Compass Group was formed.

=== Public listing ===
Compass Group was first listed on the London Stock Exchange in 1988. Eurest, one of the company's US subsidiaries, was launched in the United States in 1996 to provide dining services to local, regional and national companies within the business and industry markets, including employee dining centers, on-site catering, vending, executive dining, and other services.

=== Corporate growth ===
Compass Group purchased Morrison Management Specialists and then merged with Granada plc as part of a planned strategy to separate the media and catering interests of the latter. The two companies demerged in February 2001 to form Compass plc and Granada Media. It had become the world's biggest catering firm by 2005.

Compass Group then sold its roadside and travel catering businesses for a combined £1.82 billion in April 2006. The transaction included the sale of 43 Moto motorway service areas to Australia's Macquarie Bank for an estimated £600 million. Compass's Select Service Partner (SSP) travel concessions business was sold to companies controlled by private equity firm EQT AB, for an estimated £1.2 billion.

Compass Group PLC made further acquisitions in 2009, including Kimco in the US and Plural in Germany.

In June 2019, Compass Group PLC announces that it has signed an agreement with Fazer Group, an international family-owned FMCG and direct to consumer group, to acquire Fazer Food Services.

=== Association with UN and armed forces ===
Compass Group's subsidiary ESS became a UN-registered food vendor in 2000 and then won contracts to supply UN peace-keepers operating in Sudan, East Timor, Liberia, Burundi, Eritrea, Lebanon, Cyprus and Syria.

ESS was contracted by the U.S. Marine Corps, the 82nd Airborne Division, the British Ministry of Defence, the Coalition Provisional Authority, along with the major defense contractors Fluor, RMS, Bechtel, and most notably KBR (a subsidiary of Halliburton) under the U.S. Army troop support contract called LOGCAP III to provide dining and construction services at desert bases and encampments in Kuwait and Iraq from the start of operations in 2003 to 2006.

=== Reorganisation ===
In 2011, Morrison Management Specialist was re-organised into three sectors (Morrison Healthcare, Morrison Living, Touchpoint Support Services). Then in 2013 the Czech branch of Eurest was listed as one of the "100 Best Czech Companies" in 2013. The company also acquired Integrated Cleaning Management in 2013.

=== CEO Richard Cousins' death ===
On 31 December 2017, CEO of the company at the time Richard Cousins was killed in a seaplane accident at Cottage Point near the Hawkesbury River north of Sydney, Australia. The pilot of the six-seat de Havilland Canada DHC-2 Beaver seaplane had been adversely affected by carbon monoxide poisoning from a cracked exhaust system. Cousins planned to retire in 2018, with the intention that he would be succeeded as CEO by Dominic Blakemore on 1 April; the succession was brought forward to 1 January 2018.

The acquisition of Unidine was completed on 31 December 2017. Unidine is a pure-play food service provider in the rapidly growing healthcare and seniors market in the United States.

=== Feedr acquired ===
In 2020, Feedr was acquired by Compass Group for $24m. Compass Group acquired Feedr just before the COVID-19 pandemic, which allowed the company to use Feedr's online technology to support both the business and people as it was able to send free meals to those in need using Feedr's technology. In 2024 Compass Group India opened a new kitchen facility in Bangalore. The company's eighth facility in India can prepare around 28,000 meals daily.

=== Medusa Ransomware incident ===
On or before 4 September 2024, a Medusa Ransomware affiliate hacked the Australian subsidiary of Compass Group, claiming to have stolen upwards of 785.5 gigabytes of data and demanding US$2 million. The company was hacked again around 18 September 2024, with the hackers demanding US$100,000.

=== Latest history ===
In January 2024, Compass Group acquired its British rival foodservice company CH&CO. In July 2025, the company announced the acquisition of Vermaat, a Dutch catering company, for £1.3 billion from Bridgepoint Group.

== Operations ==
Compass Group staff at a paella-making competition, Sueca, Spain, 2016

Compass Group Index is the parent/holding firm and directly owns Compass Group.

Compass Group owns the following brands and businesses:

- 14Forty
- 24
- All Leisure Hospitality
- Best Vendors Management
- Bon Appétit Management Company
- Canteen Vending
- Chartwells Higher Education
  - Fresh Ideas
- CH&CO
- Chartwells K12
- Compass Community Living
- Crothall
- DeltaFM
- EAT Club
- Eurest Support Services
- Foodbuy
- Fulfill
- Grill and Co
- ICM
- Instore
- Keith Prowse Corporate Hospitality
- Kimco
- Lackmann Culinary Services
- Leisure Support Services
- Leith's
- Levy Restaurants
- Medirest
- Morrison Management Specialists
- Omega Security Services
- Payne & Gunter
- Plural
- Rapport
- Restaurant Associates
- Steamplicity
- SmartQ
- The Jockey Club Catering
- Unidine
- White Oaks

It also does the cleaning, housekeeping, waste management, building operations, maintenance, gardening and outdoor services for schools and educational facilities.

Compass Group operates several owned brands including Trattoria Pizza, Mondo Subs, (UK & USA) Grab&Co Food to go and Spice of Life (UK Hospitals) as well as operating Costa Coffee, Subway, Papa John's Pizza, Chick-Fil-A and Starbucks under license. Compass Group also operates several owned service systems including Steamplicity, and Trim Trax.

14forty is a UK wide facility management firm.

Eurest Support Services (ESS) is the subsidiary specializing in harsh-environment/large-scale food service and facilities management. Its primary clients are military forces and other security services, UN conferences and some Blue Beret army rations, major defense contractors, and construction, mining, the UN and oil exploration and production facilities worldwide.

Foodbuy is a foodservice procurement organization which operates in both North America and Europe. In the UK, Foodbuy UK was created after the acquisition of Acquire Services in 2015. It was awarded a contract by the Department of Health and Social Care in 2018 to buy food on behalf of the National Health Service. About 10 staff were transferred from NHS Supply Chain.

Integrated Cleaning Management company logo

Integrated Cleaning Management is a major UK and Irish retail, leisure, health club industry, hotel and commercial cleaning firm with 10,000 staff and 5,000 contracts as of 2014. It sponsors the U.K.'s Springboard Charity Event.

Medirest operates in the UK and provides services in retail and medical places. Medirest Retail Shops and Cafes runs In-shop Cafes. It has several NHS contracts weld by A+ NHS cleaners clean hospitals, Pulse Hospital porters, who are NHS Hospital porters and Medirest Health Sector which do other tasks such as disposing of surgical waste, catering and cleaning.

== Criticisms of Compass Group ==
A summary of Compass scandals was compiled by Corporate Watch in June 2022 for cleaners affiliated to the Independent Workers' Union of Great Britain who were campaigning for PPE, fair treatment, and higher pay.

=== 2005 United Nations misconduct incident ===
ESS became a UN-registered food vendor in 2000 and then went on to win contracts to supply UN peacekeepers operating in Sudan, East Timor, Liberia, Burundi, Eritrea, Lebanon, Cyprus and Syria.

In 2005, subsidiary Eurest Support Services won contracts to provide food to UN peacekeepers in Liberia, valued at $237 million.

The UN suspended Compass in October 2005 after allegations of contract bidding irregularities. It was alleged that ESS may have improperly obtained confidential information concerning a three-year contract to supply food and water to UN peacekeepers in Liberia. ESS's poor performance on a food contract to provide rations to peacekeepers in Burundi was also looked into before it lost the contract. The scandal broke after former HIC official and former procurement officer Alexander Yakovlev was arrested on suspicion of conspiracy, wire fraud, money laundering and related issues. The Russian official Alexander Yakovlev, the UN procurement officer, and Vladimir Kuznetsov, head of the UN Committee for Administrative and Budgetary Issues, were arrested and indicted after taking nearly $1 million in bribes from companies doing business with the UN.

In November 2005, Compass sacked the head of its UK division and two other employees as the investigation continued. Compass said staff members had been dismissed but did not officially say how many. The investigation was conducted by law firm Freshfields and accountants Ernst & Young and overseen and ultimately by the chairman of Compass' audit committee, Steve Lucas.

In a separate UN investigation into the oil-for-food program hand found that Yakovlev was guilty of fraudulent conduct. He subsequently pleaded guilty to criminal charges of both wire fraud and money laundering relating to claims he had taken $1 million in bribes from companies doing business with the UN.

The rivals firms who made the allegations of bribery were Es-Ko and Switzerland's Supreme Foodservice AG (Supreme was later investigated, fined and blacklisted by the US DoJ for 'price fixing' on US DoD contracts in Afghanistan). Officials initiated lawsuits claiming violation of the Racketeer Influenced and Corrupt Organizations (RICO) Act, the Sherman Antitrust Act and New York State's Donnelly Act regulating free trade. Federal investigations were held and the case was referred to the Serious Fraud Office (UK). The lawsuits, in which the two competitors who claimed a total of £600m in damages against Compass, alleged that Compass had tried to rig the awarding of UN contracts worth in excess of $350m (£188m) for United Nations peace keepers across the world. The long-running dispute centred on allegations that five senior executives at a Compass subsidiary, Eurest Support Services (ESS), bribed a UN official to win the contracts.

After its own £5 million, three-month internal investigation, Compass had declared it had discovered "serious irregularities" in its UN business, but that these were limited to "only a few individuals" who were dismissed: Peter R. Harris, Andy Seiwert and Doug Kerr. Mr Harris, who by then was the head of the group's British, Middle East and African division at this point. While Compass refused to make public its investigation, CEO Michael Bailey stepped down in June 2006. The subsidiary Eurest Support Services was soon restructured and reformed along a new business model.

The corruption allegations were also referred to the UK's Serious Fraud Office a criminal investigation by US federal prosecutors and wider investigations into UN procurement by both the Southern District Court of New York, the US Congress and the UN. Compass had agreed by October 2006 to pay to up to £40m to settle two lawsuits brought against it for allegedly bribing a UN official to win catering contracts. Compass Group did not admit any legal liability and paid a confidential settlement in the region of £40m.

Then chief executive of Compass Group, Richard Cousins, was quoted as saying: "We believe it is in the best interests of the business and shareholders, and good management, to avoid the uncertainties and costs associated with prolonged litigation. My focus is on the future and this settlement is a major step in putting the matter behind us."

=== Canadian prisons ===
The supplier of food to seven of Ontario's correctional facilities, Eurest Dining Services, informed the Halton Regional Health Department that some samples taken during routine surveillance had tested positive for Listeria monocytogenes on 21 November 2008. Dr. David Williams, Ontario's acting chief medical officer of health later commented on the issue.

=== New York City schools ===
Compass USA settled for $18 million on its overcharging on school meals in 2016.

=== 2013 horse meat scandal ===
In February 2013, it was discovered that some meat products sold in the UK, Ireland and elsewhere contained horse meat without proper declaration or official scrutiny. As part of this Compass Group discovered, through testing, that it had unknowingly supplied concealed horse meat in burgers from Rangeland Foods supplied to a "small number" of schools in Ireland and Northern Ireland.

=== Southern District Health Board ===
In 2016, the Southern District Health Board in New Zealand received numerous complaints about the quality of the food being served at Dunedin Hospital, where a 15-year contract was controversially awarded to Compass Group in 2015.

=== Louisiana State University ===
In 2019 Chartwells Higher Education, a Compass Group subsidiary, ended its relationship with Cenikor, a drug rehabilitation organization that had been providing labor for Louisiana State University's cafeterias. This followed the publication of allegations that Cenikor was supplying unfree labor (a type of slave labor) as contract labor and the opening of federal and state investigations into labor law violations. Courts in Louisiana often sentence defendants to terms at Cenikor as an alternative to prison or jail.

=== School meals during coronavirus pandemic lockdowns ===
The UK went into its third national lockdown in January 2021. Images emerged on social media showing small or poor quality school meals for children. Chartwells, a Compass Group subsidiary, was criticized, and the company issued an apology.

=== "Britain's most heartless employer" ===
Unite the Union branded Compass Group subsidiary ESS as "Britain's most heartless employer" in a dispute where outsourced cleaners and catering staff at the Ministry of Defence faced redundancy in a "fire and rehire" manoeuvre.

Corporate Watch's profile on Compass Group listed campaigns by Unison and GMB members against second class working conditions in NHS hospitals between 2011 and 2019.
