= Michael Bailey (businessman) =

British fraudster (born 1948)

Michael Bailey (born 14 October 1948 in the United Kingdom) was the chief executive officer of the Compass Group, a British food service company in the FTSE 100 Index. He stepped down on 31 May 2006.

== Background ==
Michael Bailey joined the Compass Group in 1993 as a Group Development Director. He became CEO of the business in July 1999. He stood down in 2006.

== Sources ==
- Compass Group PLC - Official site
