= List of Sukhoi Superjet 100 orders and deliveries =

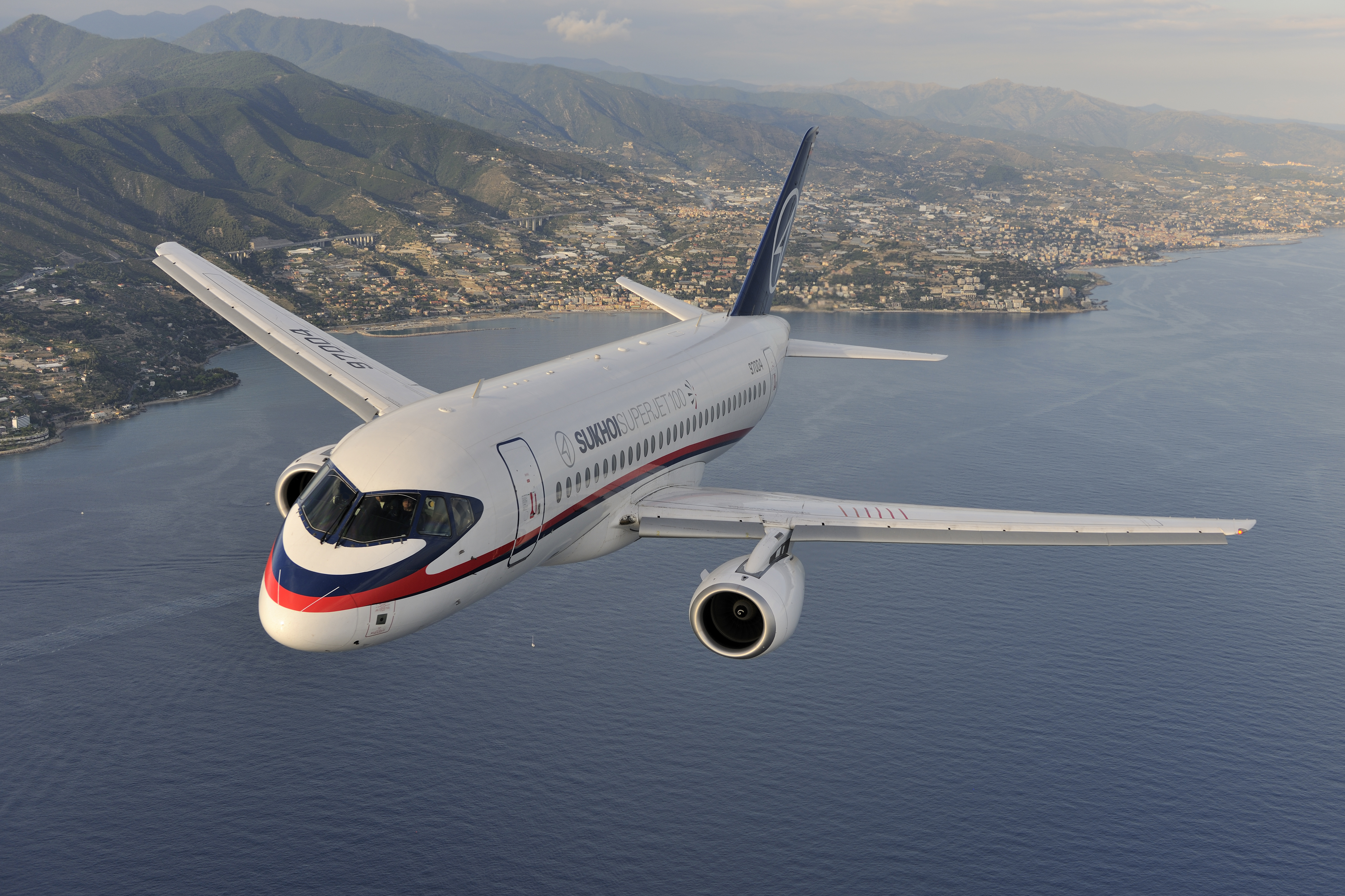
A Superjet 100 flying off the coast of Italy near Sanremo during its 2010 promotional tour.

This article lists firm orders and deliveries for the Superjet 100, currently in production by the United Aircraft Corporation division Irkut (until November 2018 by the Sukhoi Company).

It is impossible to confirm the accuracy of the Superjet order backlog as the manufacturer does not provide up to date order information, and there have been no updates on many longstanding orders.

As of April 2023, there were reportedly around 160 Superjet 100 aircraft in service, up from 146 aircraft delivered with 116 operating in 2016.

== Orders and deliveries ==
=== Overview ===
Net orders and deliveries by year (as of 30 April 2018)
	2005	2006	2007	2008	2009	2010	2011	2012	2013	2014	2015	2016	2017	2018	Total
Orders	30	0	0	0	15	0	22	0	2	13	58	28	28	106	301
Deliveries	-						5	8	14	27	21	21	25	26	147

Net orders and deliveries
As of 1 January 2023

=== Timeline ===
- Aug 2005 – Finance Leasing Company and Sukhoi Civil Aircraft sign a sales contract for 10 aircraft of the new RRJ family for $262 million at MAKS-2005.
- Dec 2005 – Aeroflot signs the contract for the delivery of 30 Sukhoi Superjet 100s, thus becoming the program's launch customer. The total deal is valued at approximately $820 million.
- 19 December 2006 – Sukhoi Civil Aircraft wins a $170 million order from Dalavia Far East Airways.
- May 2007 – Aeroflot and Sukhoi Civil Aircraft Company announces the signature of the Letter of Intent to purchase 15 aircraft of Sukhoi Superjet 100 family. Earlier, Aeroflot had already signed the contract for delivery of 30 SSJ-100s. According to the letter, the airline will purchase 15 SSJ100/95s in basic configuration with deliveries to start in May 2011. The airline also holds an option for another five aircraft of the family. The deal amounts at over $400 million.
- Sep 2007 – Armavia signs a multimillion-dollar agreement to buy four SSJ-100-95LR Superjets for regional flights.
- Jul 2008 – Avia Leasing acquires 24 Sukhoi Superjet 100 aircraft in basic configuration with an option for 16 additional aircraft on the second day of the 2008 Farnborough Airshow. The order has a total value of over $630 million. Order firmed at Paris Airshow on 16 June 2009.
- Jul 2008 – SuperJet International announces an order by an undisclosed renowned European customer for a fleet of 20 new Sukhoi Superjet 100 aircraft valued at approximately $600 million.
- 5 December 2008, Jakarta – Sukhoi Civil Aircraft Company and Kartika Airlines sign the Heads of Agreement for 15 Sukhoi Superjet 100s and another 15 optional aircraft. The order is valued at $448 million. Kartika Airlines was to be the first SSJ100 customer in Southeast Asia. But ultimately no aircraft were delivered and Kartika ceased all operations by 2010.
- 17 June 2009, Paris Airshow – Gazprom orders 10 Superjet 100 aircraft.
- 21 August 2009 – Yakutia Airlines orders 2 Superjet 100 aircraft.
- May 2010 – Laos-based newcomer Phongsavanh Airlines plans to launch services in 2012 and buy three Sukhoi RRJ95 SuperJet 100s.
- 23 June 2010 – European Aviation Safety Agency certification for the Superjet Engine SaM146.
- 19 July 2010 – Sukhoi Civil Aircraft and Indonesia's regional carrier Kartika Airlines sign $951 mln deal on 30 SSJ100s.
- 20 July 2010 – Orient Thai Airlines to buy at least 12 Superjet 100s from Sukhoi.
- 21 July 2010 – SuperJet International scores order for 30 Superjets, 15 options.
- 1 September 2010 – Aeroflot announced that as part of its plan to order additional domestic aircraft it planned to purchase an additional 10 aircraft in addition to its 30 prior orders.
- 2 September 2010 – SuperJet International signs agreement up to US$300 million.
- 24 November 2010 – Thailand's Orient Thai Airlines announced the purchase of 12 Sukhoi Superjet-100/95Bs civilian aircraft.
- 17 January 2011 – Mexico's third largest airline Interjet signed a $650 million deal for 15 Sukhoi Superjet-100 civilian aircraft, with an option to purchase five more. It is the North American launch customer and is the first and, so far, the only airline of the Americas to order a Sukhoi Superjet 100.
- 3 February 2011 – Sukhoi Superjet 100 obtained IAC AR Type Certificate
- 19 April 2011 – The first production aircraft was delivered to Armavia, celebrated with a ceremony in the Armenian capital Yerevan.
- 21 April 2011 – The first commercial flight of Sukhoi SuperJet 100 with 90 passengers from Zvartnots International Airport, Yerevan, Armenia to Sheremetyevo International Airport, Moscow.
- 16 June 2011 – Aeroflot Russian Airlines's Superjet 100 completed its first passenger flight operating from Sheremetyevo International Airport, Moscow, to Pulkovo International Airport, St. Petersburg.
- 17 June 2011 – Aeroflot Russian Airlines's Superjet 100 completed its first schedule flight operating from Sheremetyevo International Airport, Moscow, to Nizhny Novgorod International Airport, Nizhny Novgorod.
- 9 October 2011 – Comlux becomes the launching customer of SuperJet International for this new type of VIP aircraft
- 19 March 2012 – All seven SuperJet planes in service grounded to have landing gear defect repaired. "Within a week the whole fleet will have repairs conducted," said a company spokesman, three days after an Aeroflot SuperJet made an unscheduled landing at Moscow's Sheremetyevo Airport.
- 9 May 2012 – Crash during a demonstration flight in Indonesia, with 45 fatalities and no survivors.
- 10 May 2012 – Pakistan's Air Indus allegedly showed an interest in buying 8 SSJ-100 planes.
- 21 June 2012 – Transaero, Russia's number two carrier, signs a deal to buy up to 16 SSJ100 with delivery date starting 2015.
- 18 June 2013 – Mexico's Interjet received its first Superjet 100 by Sukhoi at the Paris Air Show, another 19 Superjet 100s are due to be delivered in the coming months.
- 26 August 2015 – Russian leasing company State Transport Leasing Co. (STLC) has signed a firm order for 32 Sukhoi Civil Aircraft Sukhoi Superjet 100 (SSJ100) aircraft at the MAKS (air show). The aircraft will be leased to Russian (Yamal Airlines 25 aircraft) and foreign operators.
- 27 August 2015 – President Vladimir Putin announces at the MAKS air show, an international military exhibition held in the Russian city of Zhukovsky, with Egyptian President Abdel Fattah el-Sisi attending the exhibition, that it seeks to sell 12 Superjet 100 by Sukhoi to Egypt.
- 3 February 2016 – Egypt's Air Leisure signed a letter of intent in buying 4 SSJ-100 aircraft with an option of 6 more.
- 23 July 2017, MAKS (airshow) – 2017, Among MAKS’ biggest deals were a contract for the supplies of 20 Sukhoi Superjet 100 planes to Aeroflot.
- 25–28 Apr 2018, Eurasia Airshow – Four orders of 92 SSJ-100 aircraft made in letters of intention made with S7, Iran Air Tours, Aseman Airlines, and Aero Mongolia.
- 10 September 2018: Aeroflot reached an agreement for 100 Superjets in a two-class layout with 12 business seats and 75 in economy, to be delivered from 2019 to 2026.
- 28 October 2025: India's Hindustan Aeronautics Limited (HAL) signed a memorandum of understanding with Russia's United Aircraft Corporation.

=== Orders and current operators ===
This is a list of sourced orders and current operators of the Superjet 100. However, as Sukhoi last updated its official order overview in 2012 and secondary sources are either outdated or contradicting, it is not possible to determine a fully complete and currently correct overview.

Date	Airline	EIS	Orders	Options	Deliveries	Operated	Notes	References
7 December 2005 (first of several orders)	(Russia) Aeroflot / Rossiya Airlines	2011 / 2016	150	—	65*	4 / 73	*Ten light versions with only two lavatories were replaced after one year with full version. Some of the ten were sold to Centre-South and Red Wings Airlines. All remaining SSJs started to be transferred to Rossiya Airlines, which ordered 20 Superjets on its own in 2016. This might be obsolete due to Aeroflot's recent own new order.	
17 June 2009	(Russia) Gazpromavia	2013	10	—	10	10	One crashed as Gazpromavia Flight 9608	
21 August 2009	(Russia) Yakutia Airlines	2012	5	—	5	3	1 taken over from Red Wings Airlines.	
27 August 2013	(Russia) Rosoboronexport	2013	1	—	1	1		
20 December 2013	(Russia) Russian Ministry of Internal Affairs	2014	1	—	1	1	Aircraft taken over from Aeroflot.	
8 September 2014	(Russia) Russian Ministry of Emergency Situations	2016	8	—	2	2		
21 November 2014	(Thailand) Royal Thai Air Force for the Thai Government	2016	3	—	3	3		
8 December 2014	(Russia) Russian Presidential Administration	2015	2	—	2	2	Both aircraft originally destined for Lao Central Airlines.	
7 August 2015	(Kazakhstan) Kazakh Border Patrol	2016	1	—	1	1		
25 August 2015	(Russia) Yamal Airlines (leased via GTLK)	2016	25	—	15	15		
18 April 2016	(Russia) IrAero (leased via GTLK)	2016	8	—	8	8	4 taken over from Red Wings Airlines.	
29 March 2017	(Russia) Azimuth (leased via GTLK)	2017	13	13	13	11		
28 April 2018	(Russia) Severstal Air (leased via IFC)	2018	6	—	3	3		
28 February 2019	(Thailand) Kom Airlines	2019	6	—	—	—	Planned delivery scheduled from 2019 not kept as airline not commenced operations yet.	
2020	(Russia) Red Wings Airlines (leased via IFC)	2020	60	—	21	17	4 aircraft already taken over from Moskovia Airlines and operated until 2016.	
Total:			299	13	150	145		

== Letters of Intention signed and lessor/lessee agreements ==
The following airlines and leasing companies signed letters of intent to order Superjet aircraft or lease them. Not included are contracts which are known to have been cancelled. Several of these entries might be no longer current as there is a lack of updates for several long-standing announcements.

Date	Airline	Planned EIS	Orders	Options	Notes	References
22 November 2005	(Russia) Finance Leasing Company (Lessor)	2012	10	—	Status unknown.	
17 June 2013	(Russia) Ilyushin Finance (Lessor)	2015	20	—	Leasing contract for 2 aircraft signed with defunct VLM Airlines; status unknown.	
27 August 2013	(Russia) Sberbank Leasing (Lessor)	2014	20	—	Leasing contract for 10 aircraft signed with Aeroflot in 2016, status unknown.	
25 April 2018	Iran Aseman Airlines	2020	20	—	Planned delivery schedule starting in 2020 not kept.	
25 April 2018	Iran Air Tours	2020	20	—	Planned delivery schedule starting in 2020 not kept.	
28 April 2018	Aero Mongolia	2019	2	—	Planned delivery schedule starting in 2019 not kept.	
15 November 2018	(United Arab Emirates) Alexcina (Lessor)	unknown	12	—	To be used by Alexcina Airways or to be leased out to other airlines.	
26 November 2018	(Russia) ALROSA	2019	2	—	Planned delivery schedule starting in 2019 not kept.	

== Former operators and cancelled orders/agreements ==
The following airlines and lessors either cancelled their orders/letters of intent for Superjet 100 aircraft or ended operating them for various reasons:

Date	Airline	EIS	Orders	Options	Deliveries	Operated	Notes	References
14 September 2007	(Armenia) Armavia	2011	2	—	1	—	Airline ceased operations.	
5 December 2008	(Indonesia) Kartika Airlines	2012–2014	15	15	—	—	Airline ceased operations.	
15 July 2008	(Russia) UTair Aviation (via VEB Leasing)	2012–2014	24	16	—	—	6 were produced up to the end of 2014, not delivered due to payment difficulties.	
15 June 2009	(Hungary) Malév Hungarian Airlines	2011–2015	30	—	—	—	Order suspended in 2011. Airline ceased operations in 2012.	
21 May 2010	(Laos) Lao Central Airlines	2012–	1	6	1	1	One of 3 produced delivered, the other two have been taken up by the Russian Presidential Administration.	
20 July 2010	(Thailand) Orient Thai Airlines	TBD	12	12	—	—	Airline ceased operations.	
18 August 2011	(India) Aviotech	unknown	10	10	—	—	Ordered business jet version was still in planning stages 10 years later.	
17 January 2011	(Mexico) Interjet	2013	30	10	22	—	Airline ceased operations.	
21 June 2011	(Indonesia) Sky Aviation	2012–2015	12	—	3	3	Airline ceased operations.	
22 June 2011	(Italy) Blue Panorama Airlines	2013	8	4	—	—	Order cancelled.	
16–21 Aug 2011	(Tajikistan) Tajik Air	2013	2	2	—	—	MoU with lessor never fulfilled.	
19 August 2011	(Russia) Kuban Airlines	2012	12	—	—	—	Airline ceased operations.	
19 August 2011	(Russia) Moskovia Airlines	2013	1	2	1	—	Airline ceased operations. 3 were operated. 1 was built for Armavia but delivered new to Moskovia. 2 were used ex Aeroflot aircraft. 3 aircraft sold to Red Wings Airlines.	
9 October 2011	(Switzerland) Comlux	2015	2	2	1	1	No longer operated, 1 relocated to RusJet in 2022.	
21 June 2012	(Russia) Transaero Airlines	2015	16	10	—	—	Airline ceased operations.	
2014	(Nepal) Bishwo Airways	TBD	5	—	—	—	Airline never commenced operations.	
25 August 2015	(Russia) Bural (via GTLK Leasing)	2016–2018	13	—	—	2	Airline ceased operations.	
25 August 2015	(Russia) Tuva Airlines (via GTLK Leasing)	2016–2018	10	—	—	—	Airline ceased operations.	
29 September 2015	Sky Greenland	2016–2018	5	—	—	—	Airline ceased operations.	
25 August 2015	Air Armenia	2016–2018	4	—	—	—	Order cancelled, airline since ceased operations.	
3 February 2016	(Egypt) Air Leisure	TBD	4	—	—	—	Airline ceased operations.	
2 March 2016	(Belgium) VLM Airlines	2016	4	10	—	—	Order cancelled, airline since ceased operations.	
25 August 2015	(Russia) Orenburzhye	2016–2018	8	—	—	—	Order cancelled in favor of Embraer 195s.	
8 October 2015	(Republic of Ireland) CityJet	2016	15	16	7	—	Aircraft pulled from service due to insufficient reliability.	
14 October 2015	(Armenia) Alliance Air	2016–2017	6	—	—	—	Airline ceased operations.	
26 April 2018	(Russia) S7 Airlines	2022	50	25	—	—	Letter of intent for the 75-seat version expired in 2018, this model has been meanwhile postponed indefinitely.	
16 July 2018	(Peru) Peruvian Airlines	2020S	10	—	—	—	Airline ceased operations.	
5 April 2019	(Slovenia) Adria Airways	TBD	15	—	—	—	MoU cancelled, airline since ceased operations.	
21 July 2010	(United States) Pearl Aircraft Corporation (Lessor)	2012–	30	15	—	—	Status of longstanding contract unknown, can no longer be fulfilled due to US sanctions.	
2 September 2010	(United States) Willis Lease Finance (Lessor)	2012–	6	4	—	—	Status of longstanding contract unknown, can no longer be fulfilled due to US sanctions.	
23 May 2013	(United States) Aerolease (Lessor)	unknown	4–5	—	—	—	Status of longstanding contract unknown, can no longer be fulfilled due to US sanctions.	
28 August 2013	(Lithuania) AviaAM Leasing (Lessor)	2014	5	—	—	—	Contract cancelled.	

== See also ==
Similar aircraft

- List of Airbus A220 orders and deliveries
- List of Boeing 737 MAX orders and deliveries
- List of Embraer E-Jet operators
