= Yamburg (disambiguation) =

Yamburg was the name of the town of Kingisepp, Russia, from 1703 to 1922

Yamburg may also refer to:

- Yamburg, Yamalo-Nenets Autonomous Okrug, a settlement in Yamalo-Nenets Autonomous Okrug, Russia
  - Yamburg Airport located nearby
  - Yamburg gas field
