= Kuningan Botanical Garden =

Botanical garden in Indonesia

Coordinates: 6.815555°S 108.406612°E

- Kebun Raya Kuningan
- Location within Indonesia
- Type: Botanical Garden
- Location: Kuningan Regency, West Java, Indonesia
- Nearest city: Cirebon
- Area: 156 hectares (390 acres; 1.56 km^{2})
- Created: 2005
- Operator: Indonesian Institute of Sciences
- Status: Open

Kuningan Botanical Garden (Indonesian: Kebun Raya Kuningan) is a botanical garden located at Padabeunghar village in Kuningan Regency, West Java, Indonesia. The botanical garden has a land area of 156 hectares, which is the largest in Indonesia. Kuningan Botanical Garden also served as nature-based ecotourism. The garden located near Mount Ciremai National Park opened in 2015, but closed down in 2016 due to unfinished construction projects.

== History ==
Kuningan Botanical Garden is an implementation of the Ministry of Environment and Agenda 21, for developing each region with one botanical garden. This is apparently in line with the vision and mission of Kuningan Regency sustainable development. In an effort to implement this, the development of this region carried out by the Local Government District Kuningan cooperate with the Indonesian Institute of Sciences (Lembaga Ilmu Pengetahuan Indonesia/LIPI) through the Center for Plant Conservation Bogor Botanical Garden. Botanical Garden is located in the village of Gandamekar, Kuningan northern district, West Java. Initiation of the Botanical Kuniningan Garden regional development started in 2005. The development process of Kuningan Botanical Garden annually continues to increase, both the increase in the provision of infrastructure such as building managers, means of road vehicles, road tracks, and irrigation facilities, and conservation management as nursery management, plant collection, data collection and registering plant collections, and increase in the number of plant nurseries and collection, as well as an increase in human resources is done through training activities.

== Geography ==
Kuningan Botanical Garden has an area of about 175 hectares, and is divided into nine zones. Topography of Kuningan Botanical Garden ranging from rolling hills, with a height of 490–870 meters above sea level, the expanse of volcanic rock and steep banks of water flow. Kuningan Botanical Garden have a source of water from the river in the southern Cipari Kuningan and Botanical Gardens in the central part of the basin area there is a lake or a region called the Situ, the Situ Cibuntu. Kuningan Botanical Garden is an outdoor recreation park at the same time a scientific locus for tourists as well as the surrounding community.

== Tourism and recreation ==
The number of collections vegetation has been planted in the Botanical Gardens there are 250 species, 8540 specimens as well as the number of plants in the nursery 345 species and 16 937 spesime. Some plant species are developed include Tree Jamblang, Longan, Kedoya, Pangsor, Aren, Durian, Walnuts, Cloves and Lame. In the botanical garden there are also facilities like a thematic park designed Awi Parks and Gardens rocks.

== See also ==
- List of botanical gardens
