= Mount Salak =

Eroded stratovolcano in West Java, Indonesia

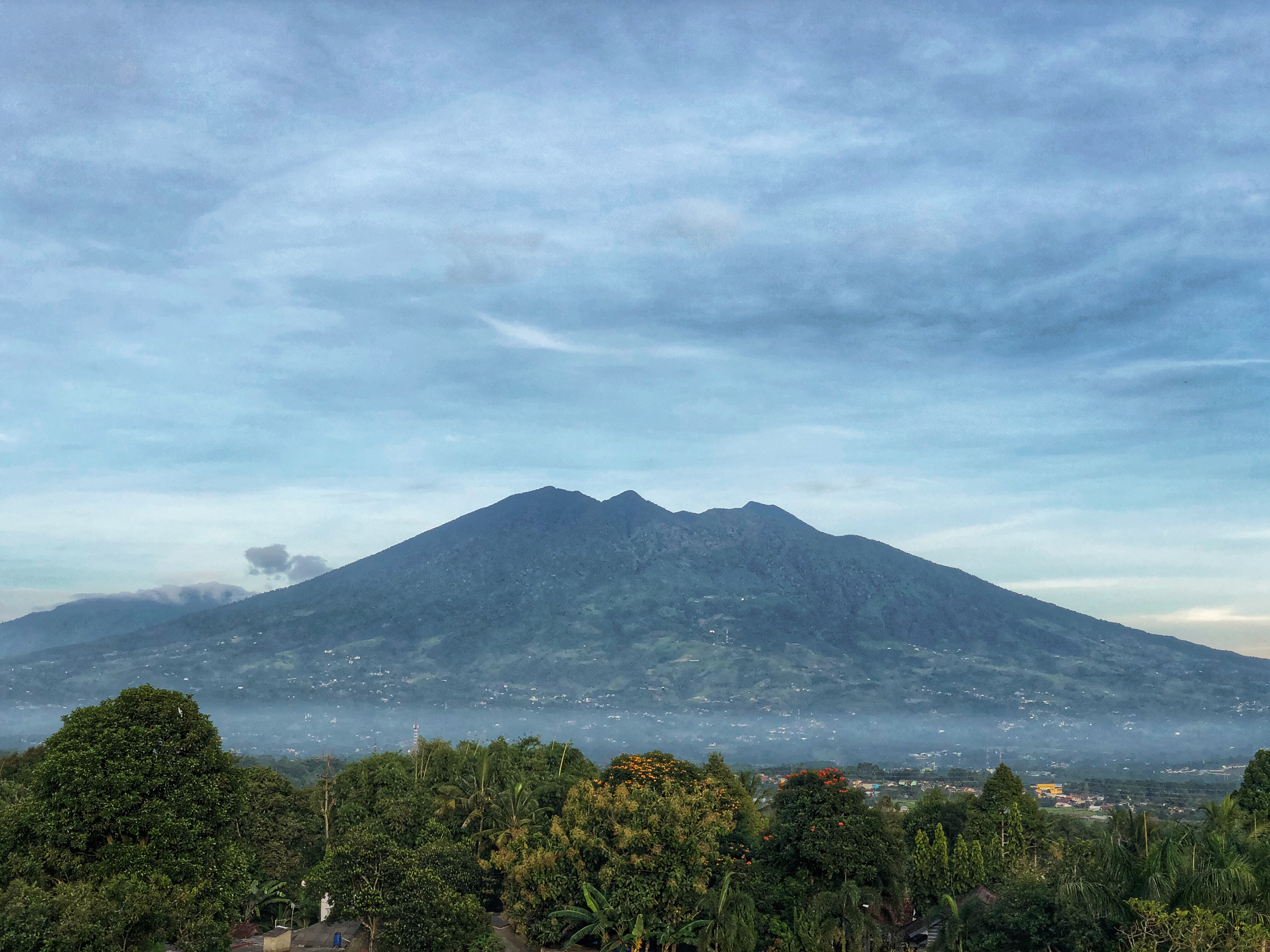
- Mount Salak as seen from Caringin District, Bogor Regency

Highest point
- Elevation: 2,211 m (7,254 ft)
- Prominence: 1,678 m (5,505 ft)
- Listing: Ultra; Ribu
- Coordinates: 06°42′57″S 106°44′01″E

Geography
- Location within Java
- Location: Java, Indonesia

Geology
- Mountain type: Stratovolcano
- Volcanic arc: Sunda Arc
- Last eruption: January 1938

Mount Salak (Indonesian: Gunung Salak, Sundanese: ᮌᮥᮔᮥᮀ ᮞᮜᮊ᮪, romanized: Gunung Salak) is an eroded volcano in West Java, Indonesia. It has several satellite cones on its southeast flank and the northern foot, along with two additional craters at the summit. Mount Salak has been evaluated for geothermal power development. According to a popular belief, the name "Salak" is derived from salak, a tropical fruit with scaly skin; however, according to Sundanese tradition, the name was derived from the Sanskrit word Salaka which means "silver". Mount Salak can be translated to "Silver Mountain" or "Mount Silver".

== Geology ==
Mount Salak is a stratovolcano with its last recorded eruption in January 1938. On October 10, 2018, there was a false alarm, as the VAAC in Darwin said that there was a sudden eruption and that an ash plume from the volcano had risen to 15 km, or 50,000 feet. It was eventually determined that no eruption had taken place.

== Hydrology ==
The complex area of Mount Salak serves as the headwater for two river basins and acts as a boundary between basins that flow towards the northern and southern coasts of Java. The Cisadane River Basin directs its flow towards the northern coast of Java and flows into the Java Sea, while the Cimandiri River Basin directs its flow towards the southern coast of Java and flows into Pelabuhan Ratu Bay in the waters of the Indian Ocean. Compared to the Cimandiri River Basin, the Cisadane River Basin encompasses more than 50% of the catchment area on the northern slope, as well as parts of the eastern and western slopes of the Mount Salak complex, located in the Bogor Regency.

== Climbing routes ==
Mount Salak offers several routes for climbing. The route most often climbed is Curug Nangka, in the northern part of the range. Peak I is visited via easier routes from the east, through Cimelati and Cicurug. Peak I also can be reached by more challenging routes, from Peak II via Sukamantri and Ciapus. An additional alternate route is "the back way" through Cidahu, Sukabumi, and Kawah Ratu near Bunder Mount.

Mount Salak is popular for many mountain climbing clubs, especially Route II, because of the difficulty involved in reaching the peak. Climbers bring water with them, especially through Post I at Kawah Ratu Route. A water source, supplied by rain, exists at an altitude of 2,211 m (7,254 ft) on this route.

Cimelati can be reached from Cibuntu Village. Water is scarce in parts of this region. An irrigation system ensures that water is plentiful until Post/Shelter III. Beyond this point, travelers must carry water. The route itself is scenic, with several waterfalls as well as a large villa appearing before reaching Post/Shelter I.

== Animals ==
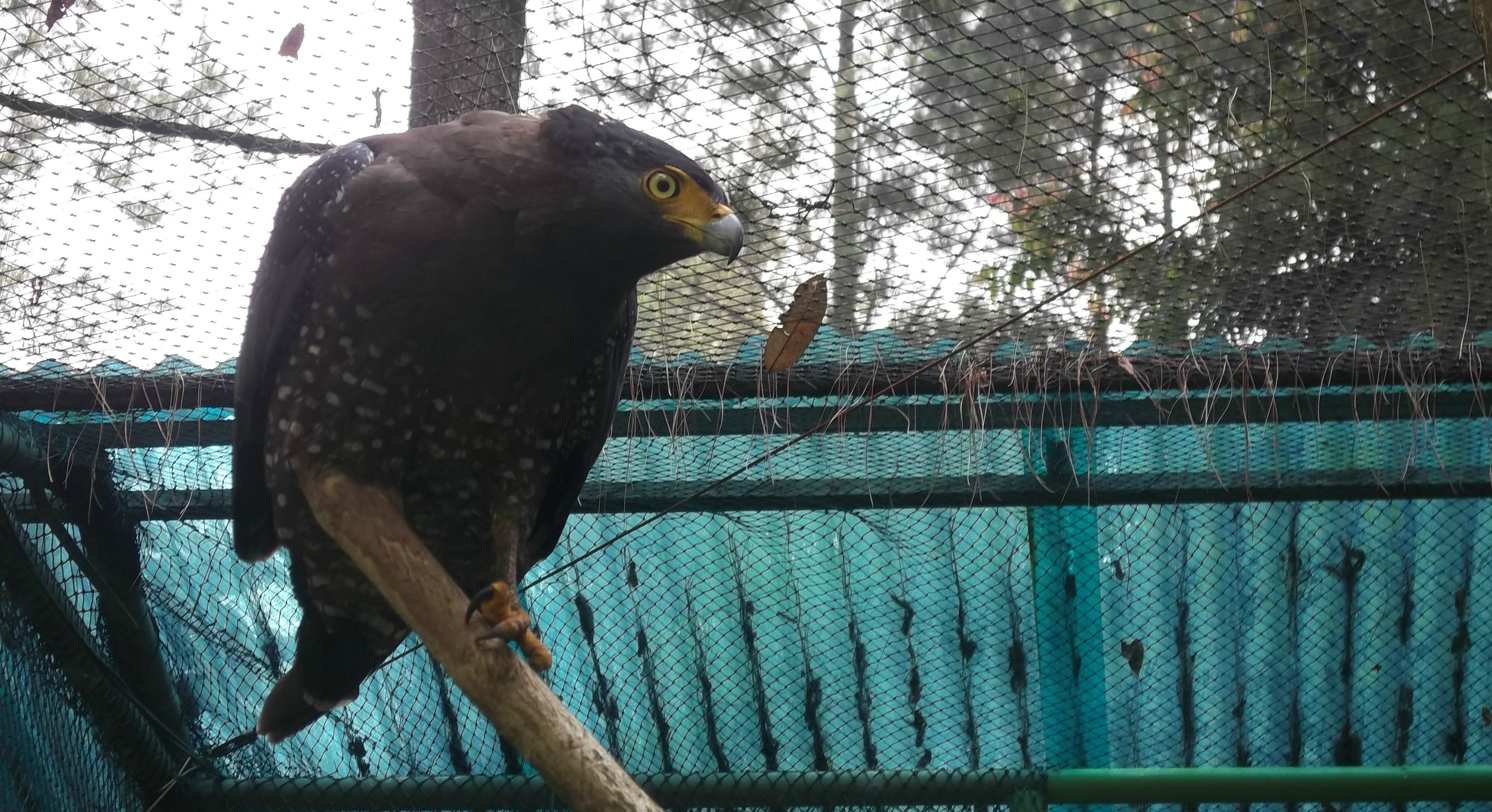
Crested Serpent Eagle (Spilornis cheela) at Eagle Sanctuary, Loji, Cigombong, West Java, on the slope of Mount Salak, ready to be released.

Mount Salak is a habitat for a variety of animal species, including frogs, toads, reptiles, birds, and mammals. During research, D. M. Nasir (2003) from KSH forest faculty IPB found 11 frog and toad species in Lingkungan S (Environment S) at Ciapus Leutik, Desa Taman Sari, Bogor Residency. They are the Asian giant toad, the Asian common toad, the Java spadefoot toad, the Indian cricket frog, Huia masonii, Limnonectes kuhlii, Limnonectes macrodon, Limnonectes microdiscus, Rana chalconota, Rana erythraea, and Rana hosii. The findings did not include tree toads and other mountain toads that might also be found there. At Cidahu, bangkong bertanduk (Megophrys montana) and katak terbang (Rhacophorus reinwardtii) were found.

Many reptiles, including lizards and snakes, live on Mount Salak. These include the chameleons Bronchocela jubata, Bronchocela cristatella, Kadal Kebun (Mabuya multifasciata), and Biawak Sungai (Varanus salvator). Some snakes living in Mount Salak are Ular Tangkai (Calamaria sp.), Ular Siput (Pareas carinatus), Ular Sanca Kembang (Python reticulatus), and many more. Mount Salak has become famous for its habitat for birds; there are at least 232 birds species in total. The most notable birds are Elang Jawa (Spizaetus bartelsi), Crested Serpent Eagle (Spilornis cheela), Ayam Hutan Merah (Gallus gallus), Cuculus micropterus, Phaenicophaeus javanicus, Phaenicophaeus curvirostris, Sasia abnormis, Dicrurus remifer, Cissa thalassina, Crypsirina temia, Burung Kuda (Garrulax rufifrons), Hypothymis azurea, Aethopyga eximia, Aethopyga mystacalis, and Lophozosterops javanicus. The notes about mammals indicate that there are not many living on Mount Salak, aside from leopards, silvery gibbons, Javan surilis, and sunda pangolins.

== Aircraft accidents ==
In 2012, The Jakarta Post dubbed Mount Salak an "airplane graveyard". High turbulence and fast-changing weather conditions of the mountainous terrain are cited as contributing factors to multiple aviation crashes in the area. There were seven aviation crashes around Mount Salak between 2002 and 2012.

One person was killed in the crash of a small aircraft in October 2002, seven in October 2003, two in April 2004, and five in June 2004. Eighteen people were killed in the crash of an Indonesian Air Force military plane in 2008.

In 2012, three people were killed in a crash of a training aircraft not long before the SSJ-100 crash, which occurred on May 9, 2012, when a Sukhoi Superjet 100 crashed into the mountain during a demonstration flight, killing all 45 people on board.

== See also ==
Media related to Mount Salak at Wikimedia Commons

- Mount Halimun Salak National Park
- List of ultras of the Malay Archipelago
- List of volcanoes in Indonesia
