= Ostafyevo International Business Airport =

Airport in Moscow, Russia

Ostafyevo Остафьево

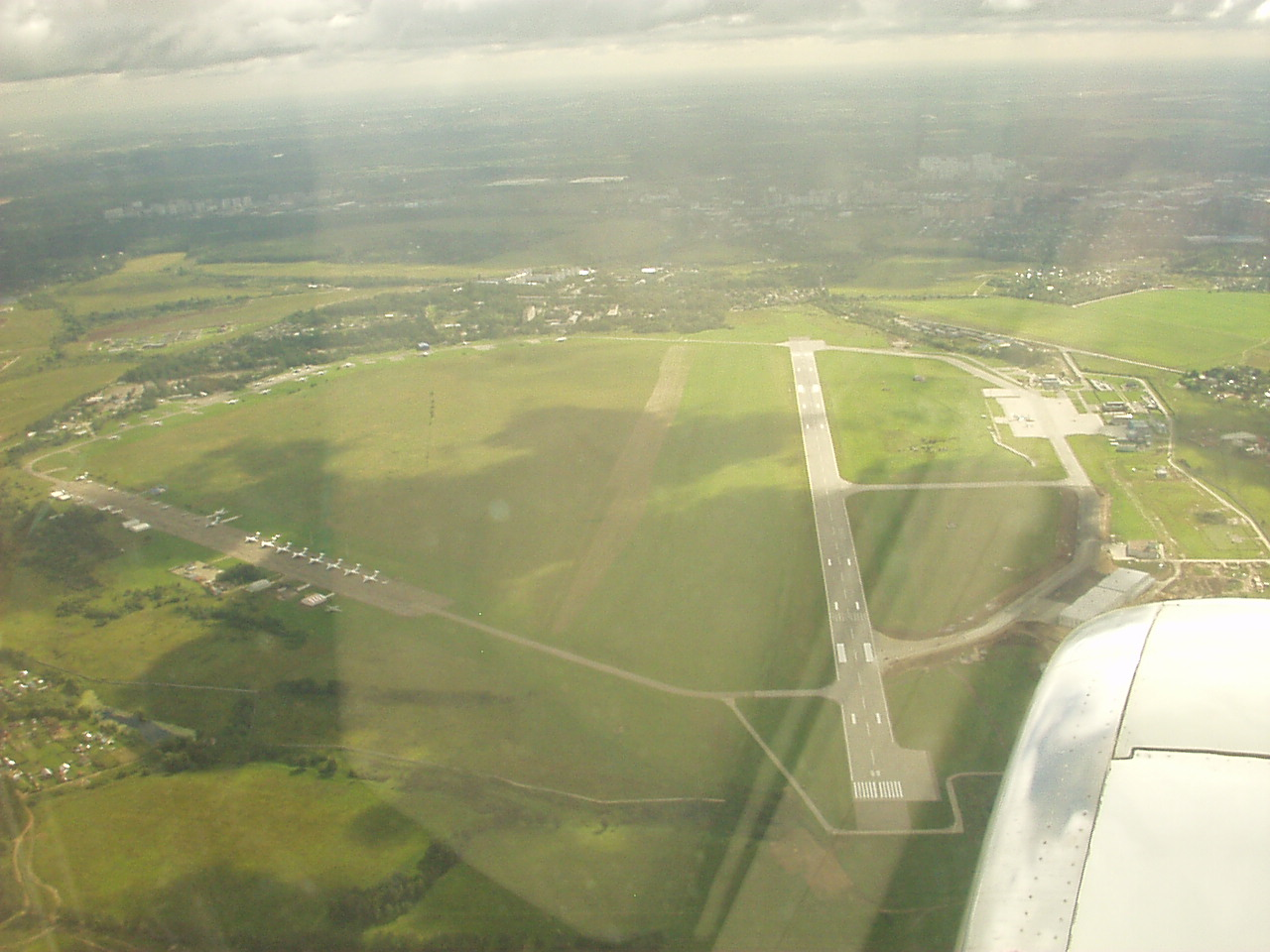
- IATA: OSF; ICAO: UUMO; LID: ОСФ

Summary
- Airport type: Public
- Operator: Gazpromavia
- Location: Moscow
- Time zone: EEST (UTC+03:00)
- Elevation AMSL: 564 ft (172 m)
- Coordinates: 55°30′42″N 37°30′26″E
- Website: https://ostafyevo.gazprom.com/
- Interactive map of Ostafyevo

Runways
Direction	Length		Surface
Direction	ft	m	Surface
08/26	6,725	2,050	Concrete

Ostafyevo (Russian: Остафьево) (IATA: OSF, ICAO: UUMO) is a former "B" class international airport, located 14 km (8.7 mi) to the south of Moscow Ring Road in Novomoskovsky administrative okrug of Moscow. The airport was owned by Gazpromavia company, a division of Gazprom until 2025, when it was sold to the City of Moscow. It was renovated and opened for civilian flights in 2000 on the grounds of a former military airbase. Ostafyevo featured a new modern glass terminal, and catered primarily to business aviation.

It could handle aircraft such as the Boeing 737-700, Bombardier Global Express, Dassault Falcon 2000, Antonov An-12, Ilyushin Il-18, Yakovlev Yak-42, Tupolev Tu-134 and smaller, as well as helicopters of all types.

== Description ==
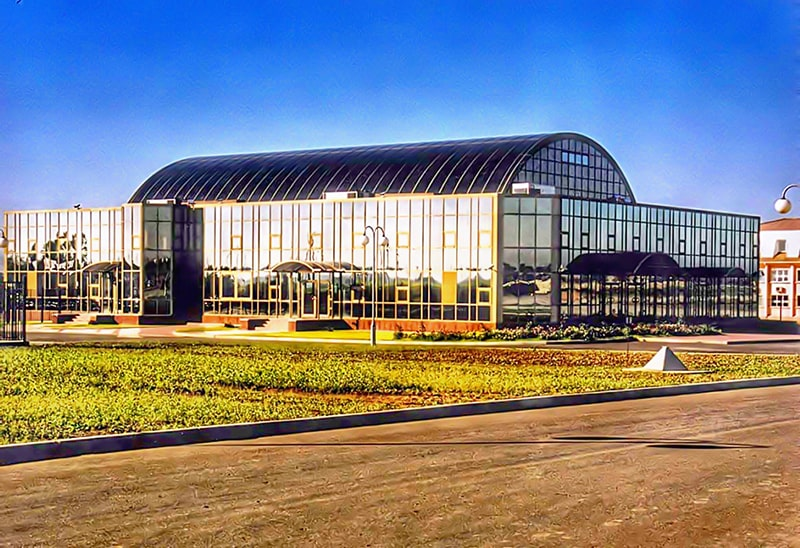
The building of the Ostafyevo Airport

The airport belonged to the Russian Ministry of defence and was operated jointly with Gazpromavia. It was home to Gazpromavia and the cargo airline Shar Ink. The only authorized handler was Aviapartner LLC.

The airport was opened for international flights in 2007. It fully met the modern standards of safety and service organization of international and domestic flights, all types of collateral obtained certificates of conformity.

Ostafyevo was positioned as an international business airport, providing ground handling services, parking (both on apron and in hangars), refuelling, catering, transfer and accommodation for crew, customs assistance, aeronautical information and organizational support, including navigational support for foreign aircraft flying in the Russian Federation.

Certified maintenance centres for business jets were on the grounds of Ostafyevo (certified by Dassault Aviation for Falcons) and helicopter EC-120B Colibri. The airport complex had 26 aircraft parking spaces, 12 of them were within walking distance from the terminal. There were two heated hangars for four aircraft. Places in the hangars were equipped with all the necessary equipment, tow bars were available. Aircraft cleaning services were available. The passenger terminal of the airport could handle up to 70 passengers per hour on domestic routes and 40 passengers per hour on international flights.

The airport was closed in October 2026 with the intention of building apartments and a technology park on the grounds.

== Interesting facts ==
- In 1803, a balloon carrying the first Russian woman to fly in a balloon, Princess P. Gagarina, landed at the Ostafyevo estate, then belonging to Prince A. Vyazemsky (son of P. Vyazemsky). The famous balloon was kept at the Ostafyevo estate for a long time.
- In the second half of the 1940s, the Ostafyevo airfield was used as an airport: Li-2 planes performed regular postal passenger and cargo-passenger flights to various cities in the USSR.

== See also ==
- List of airports in Russia
