= Gazpromavia Flight 9608 =

2024 aviation accident in Russia

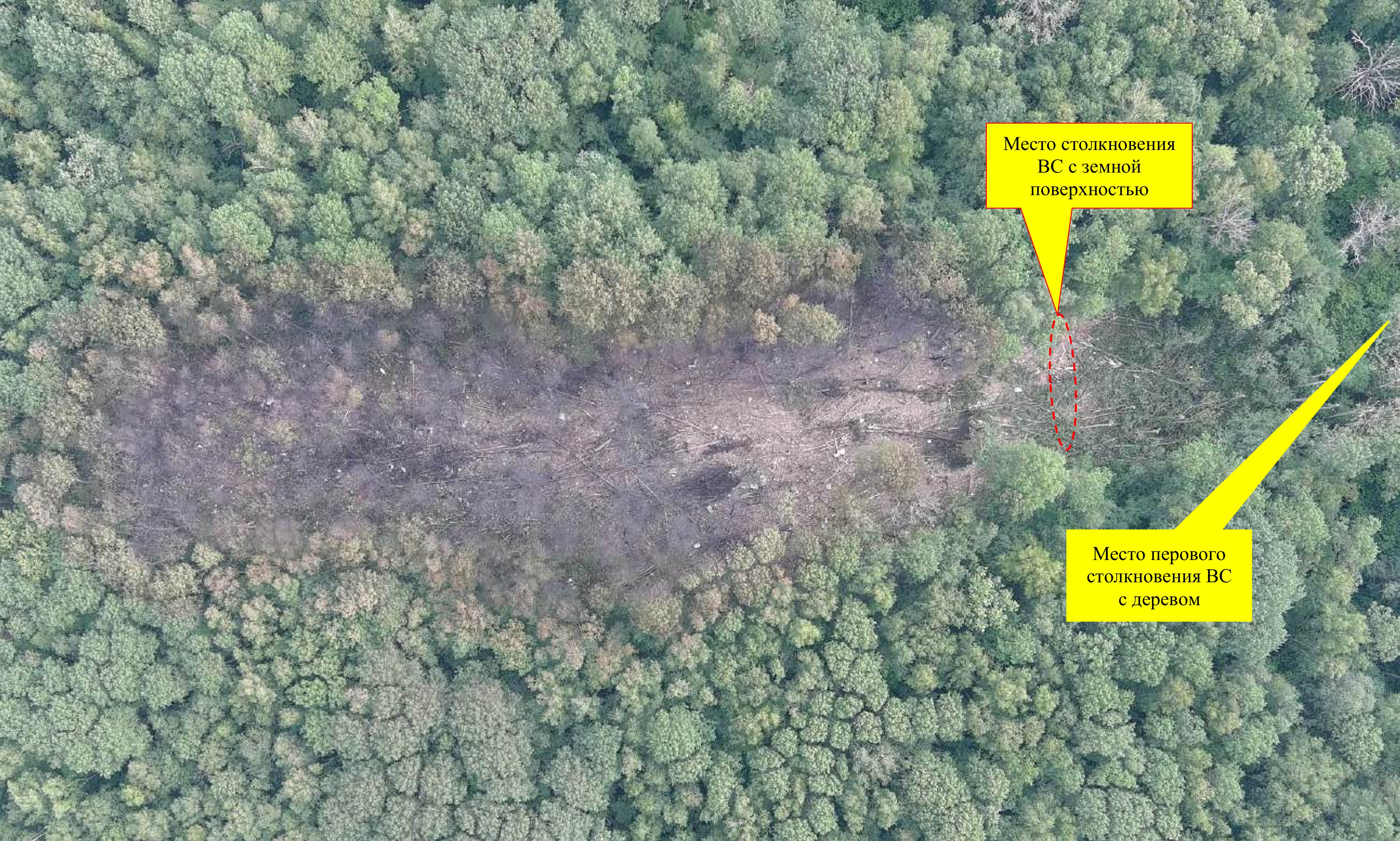
- Aerial view of the crash site

Accident
- Date: 12 July 2024
- Summary: Crashed during a ferry flight due to faulty angle-of-attack sensors
- Site: Near Tretyakovo Airport, Kolomna, Ozyory, Moscow Oblast, Russia; 54°59′31.7″N 38°39′52.3″E

Aircraft
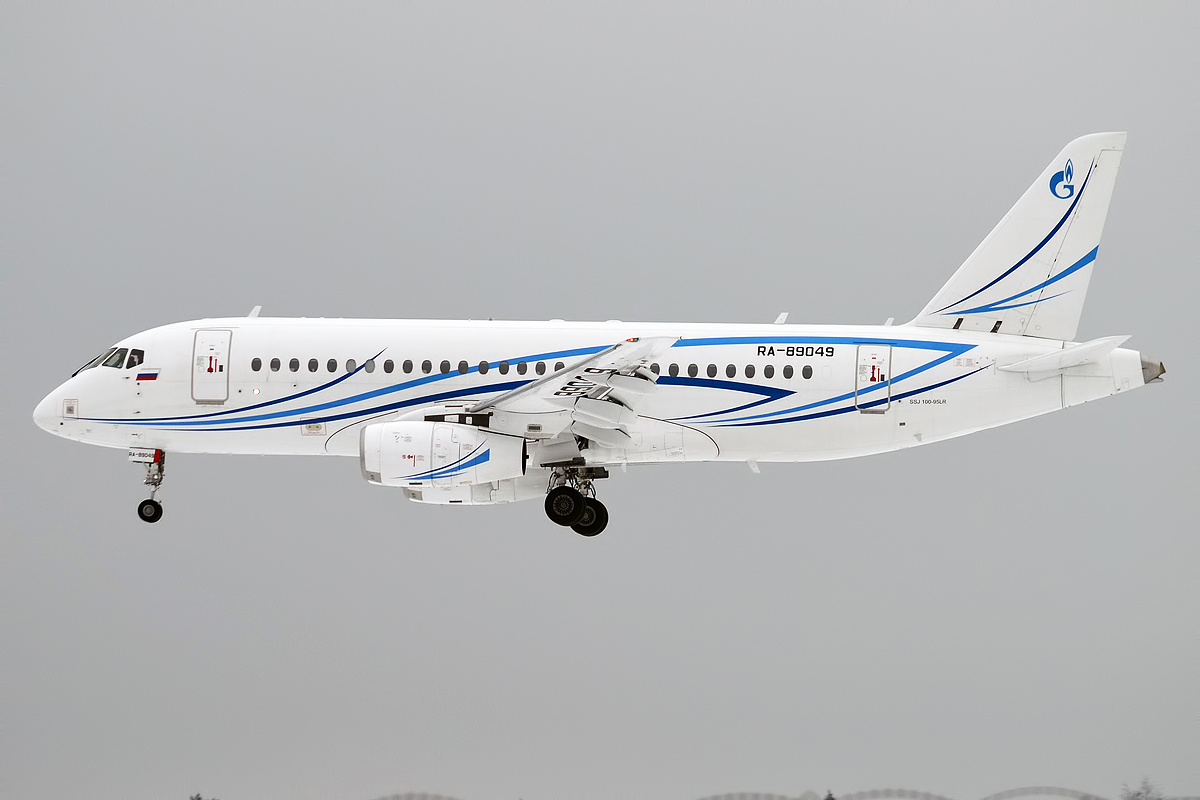
- RA-89049, the aircraft involved in the accident, seen in 2016
- Aircraft type: Sukhoi Superjet 100-95LR
- Operator: Gazpromavia
- IATA flight No.: 4G9608
- ICAO flight No.: GZP9608
- Call sign: GAZPROM 9608
- Registration: RA-89049
- Flight origin: Tretyakovo Airport, Moscow Oblast, Russia
- Destination: Vnukovo International Airport, Vnukovo District, Russia
- Occupants: 3
- Crew: 3
- Fatalities: 3
- Survivors: 0

On 12 July 2024, a Sukhoi Superjet 100 operated by Gazpromavia as Gazpromavia Flight 9608 crashed during a ferry flight from Tretyakovo Airport to Vnukovo International Airport. All three crew members, who were the only occupants on board, were killed.

== Accident ==
The aircraft was operating a ferry and test flight from the Lukhovitsy Aviation Plant after some maintenance. Four minutes after takeoff the aircraft made its last contact with the air traffic controller, and reached its maximum altitude of about 900 metres (2,953 ft).

The aircraft crashed seven minutes after takeoff, about 80 kilometres (50 mi; 43 nmi) south-east of its destination airport, near the city of Kolomna, in a wooded area killing all three crew members, the two pilots and a flight engineer, all employees of Sukhoi. According to Novaya Gazeta, the aircraft sent a distress signal and circled to burn fuel preparing to perform an emergency landing, before crashing.

According to sources cited by Izvestia, the probable cause of the crash were malfunctioning angle of attack sensors installed during maintenance. This was the fifth hull loss and third fatal accident of the Superjet since its introduction in 2011.

== Aircraft ==
The aircraft involved was a Sukhoi Superjet 100-95LR, MSN 95078, and registered as RA-89049. The aircraft was manufactured in 2014 and the flight consisted of three crew members, composed by Captain Evgeniy Bulavko, First Officer Vladislav Kharlamov, and flight attendant Maxim Lukmanov.

== Investigation ==
The investigation is being carried out by the Interstate Aviation Committee. On the evening of 12 July, both flight recorders were found. On 30 August 2024, the Interstate Aviation Committee released the preliminary report on the accident. The Ministry of Transport said that the aircraft did not have permission to fly.

=== Preliminary report ===
According to the preliminary report, the aircraft was flying at 5,000 feet (1,524 m) with a nose pitch angle between 5 and 6 degrees, the Air Data Computer 1 indicated an angle of attack between 10 and 11.5 degrees, while the second computer indicated an angle of attack between 11 and 13.5 degrees. The aircraft was cruising at a speed of 230 knots (426 km/h; 265 mph; 118 m/s). The crew received the clearance to climb at 15,000 feet (4,572 m) (FL 150), but the aircraft initially seemed to climb, but then it started to descend. To correct it, the first officer tried to pull the nose of the aircraft up to nearly 14 degrees, causing the autopilot to disconnect. Then the captain took control of the aircraft and accelerated to 270 knots (500 km/h; 311 mph; 139 m/s), arresting the descent. At 4,500 feet (1,372 m), as the aircraft starting to ascend again, the crew turned off the autothrottle and, as a consequence, the aircraft's airspeed reached 308 knots (570 km/h; 354 mph; 158 m/s), activating the overspeed warning.

The crew then reported the unreliable airspeed to the ATC. Due to the excessive airspeed, the aircraft initiated a nose-up manoeuvre and activated the speed brakes to slow the airframe down. The ascent was arrested at around 4,800 feet (1,463 m), but then the elevator automatically lowered the nose down to prevent an excessive angle of attack (AOA), so the aircraft started to descend again. At 3,000 feet (914 m), the crew attempted to arrest the descent, but the elevators did not respond and the aircraft impacted with terrain in a wooded area with a velocity of 365 knots (676 km/h; 420 mph; 188 m/s).

=== Final report ===
On 25 July 2025 the IAC released its final report. The accident had been caused by incorrect element installation of the speed and AOA protection systems. This caused the aircraft to dive into an uncontrolled dive with the pilots unable to regain control. The IAC also made some recommendations.

A source familiar with the situation told Izvestia that one of the engineers at the Lukhovitsy Aviation Plant installed two of the four angle-of-attack sensors with a deviation of approximately five degrees. This would have led to an (incorrect) activation of the stall warning system.

== See also ==
- Ethiopian Airlines Flight 302
- 2012 Mount Salak Sukhoi Superjet crash
