= Gazpromavia =

Russian airline

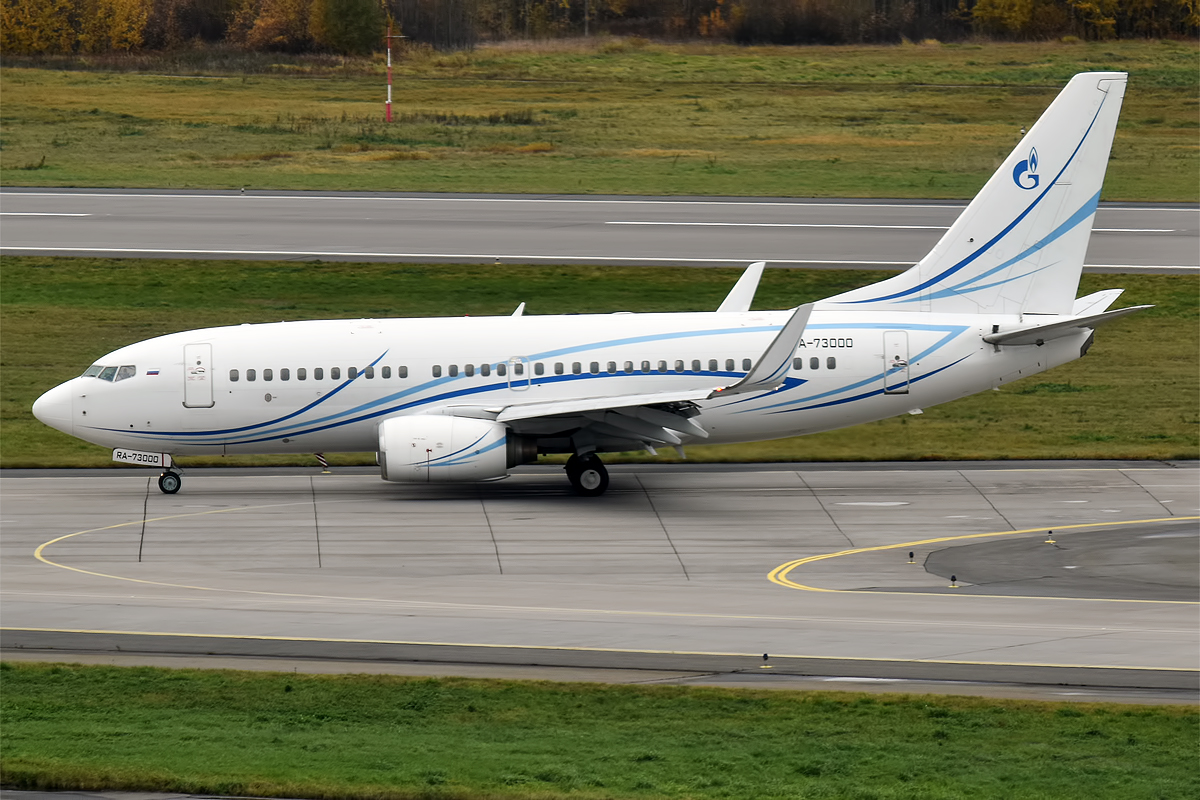
- Gazpromavia Boeing 737-700
IATA	ICAO	Call sign
4G	GZP	GAZPROM
- Founded: 1995; 31 years ago
- Hubs: Vnukovo Airport
- Fleet size: 123
- Destinations: 18 and Charters
- Parent company: PJSC Gazprom
- Headquarters: Moscow, Russia
- Key people: Andrei S. Ovcharenko, Director-General
- Website: gazpromavia.ru

Gazpromavia (Russian: Газпром авиа, lit. 'Gazprom Aviation') is an airline based in Moscow, Russia. It operates passenger and cargo charters, mainly in support of the oil and gas industry. It also operates regular domestic flights from Moscow and international charter passenger and cargo services.

The airline's head office is on the property of Ostafyevo Airport, Ryazanovskoye Settlement, Novomoskovsky Administrative Okrug. As of June 2025, the airline is banned from flying into the EU like all other Russian airlines.

== History ==
The airline was established in March 1995 and started operations on 16 April 1995. It is wholly owned by Gazprom JSC and has 2,736 employees (at March 2007).

== Airports ==
Gazpromavia owns and operates the following two Class B airports which accommodate aircraft such as the Tu-154, Il-76, An-74 and all types of helicopters:

- Gazpromavia base Ostafyevo International Airport, located near Moscow
- Yamburg airport located in Yamburg, Yamalo-Nenets Autonomous Okrug

== Destinations ==
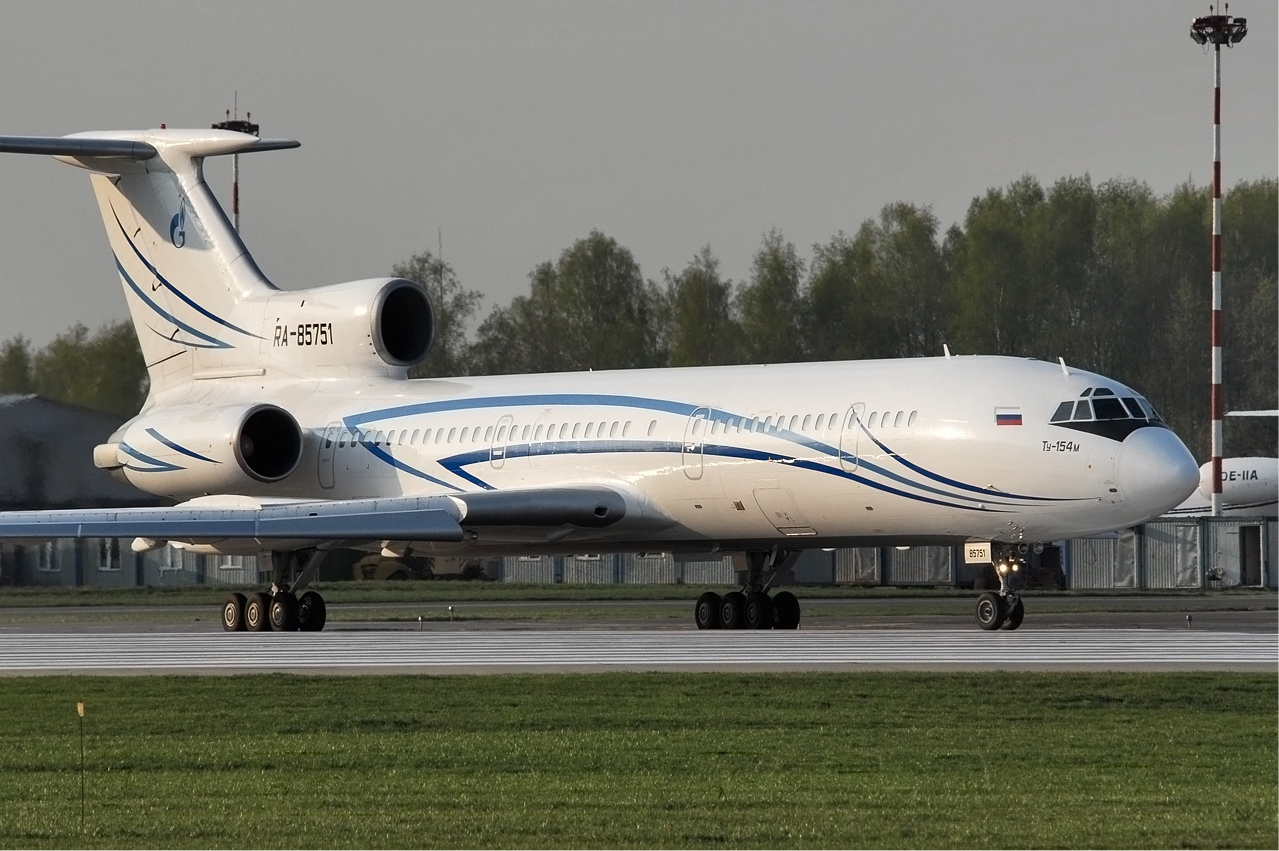
Gazpromavia Tupolev Tu-154M

Gazpromavia offers scheduled flights to the following destinations (as of December 2012):

Russia

- Barnaul – German Titov Barnaul International Airport
- Belgorod – Belgorod International Airport
- Beloyarsk – Beloyarsk Airport
- Gelendzhik – Gelendzhik Airport
- Makhachkala – Uytash Airport
- Moscow – Vnukovo Airport hub
- Nadym – Nadym Airport
- Novosibirsk – Tolmachevo Airport
- Novy Urengoy – Novy Urengoy Airport
- Saint Petersburg – Pulkovo Airport
- Samara – Kurumoch International Airport
- Sochi – Sochi International Airport
- Sovetsky – Sovetsky Airport
- Tyumen – Roschino International Airport
- Ulyanovsk – Ulyanovsk Baratayevka Airport
- Yekaterinburg – Uktus Airport

Serbia

- Belgrade – Belgrade Nikola Tesla Airport

Uzbekistan

- Nukus – Nukus Airport

=== Codeshare agreements ===
- UTair Aviation

== Aerial services ==
Gazpromavia also provides the following services:

- Aerial prospecting, monitoring and patrolling of works in regions that are difficult to access
- Aerial delivery of the working shifts
- Aerial logistical support of construction material, equipment, products, and medical supplies
- Aerial construction and installation work, Air rescue and Air Ambulance services

== Accidents and incidents ==
- December 23, 1995: The left-hand main undercarriage of an Antonov An-72 cargo aircraft (registration RA-74058) collapsed during taxi at Novy Urengoy Airport. The aircraft was substantially damaged, but was subsequently repaired.
- November 15, 2010: Gazpromavia Flight 9643, a Yakovlev Yak-42 suffered a runway excursion upon landing at Novy Urengoy Airport. The aircraft sustained damage to the left wing.
- July 12, 2024: Gazpromavia Flight 9608, a Sukhoi Superjet 100-95LR, crashed near the city of Kolomna, seven minutes after taking off from Tretyakovo Airport. All three crew members died.

== Fleet ==
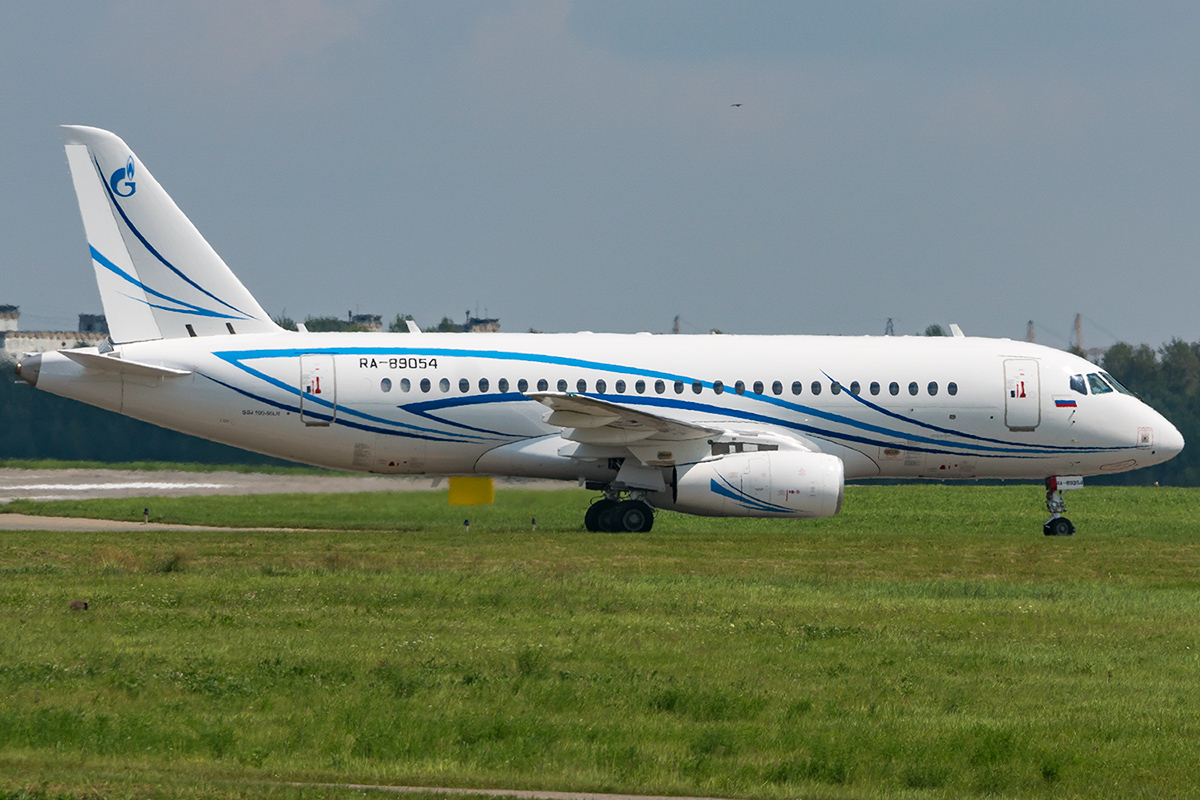
SSJ100 of Gazpromavia

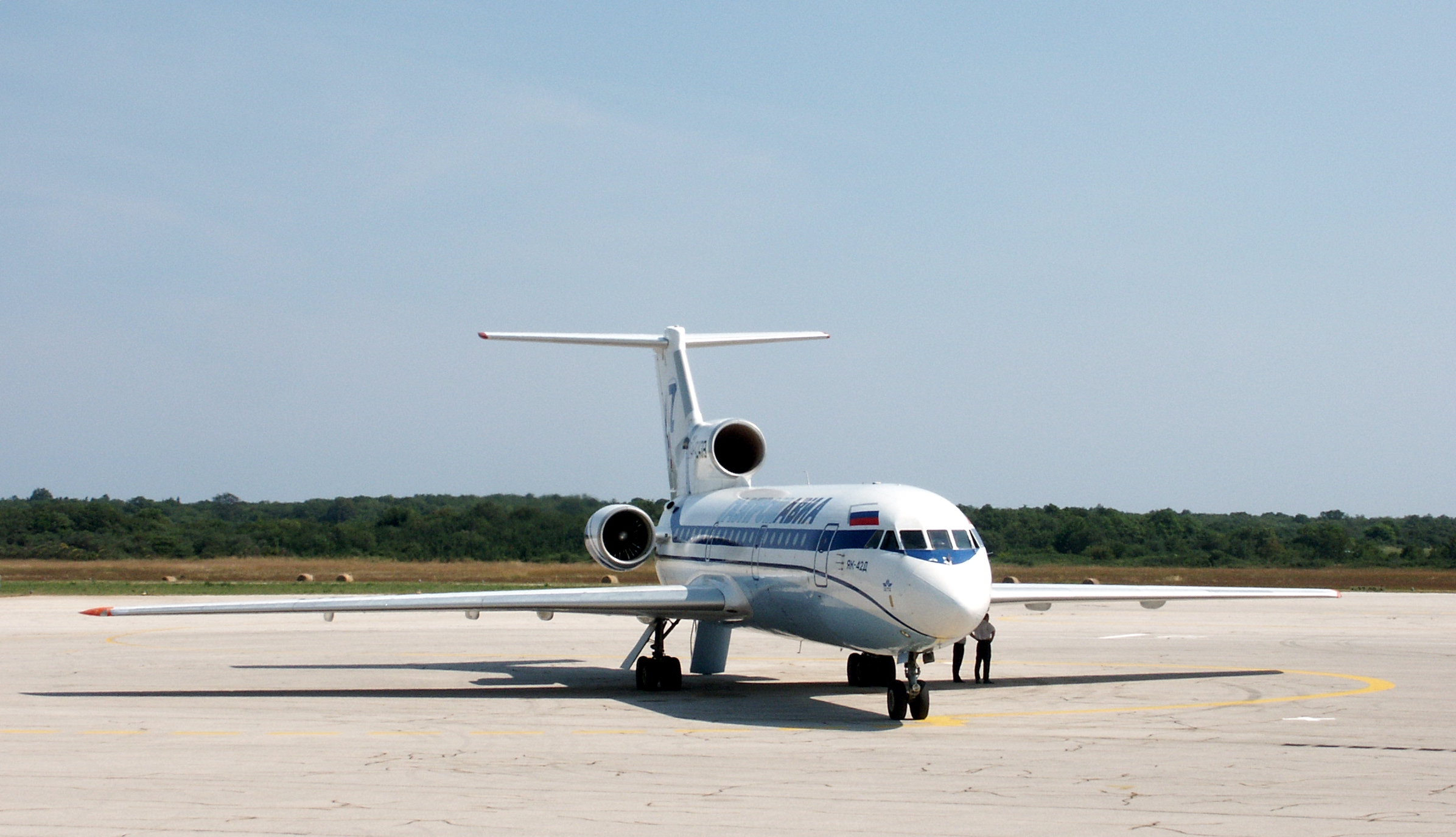
Yakovlev Yak-42D of Gazpromavia at Pula, Croatia; June, 2004

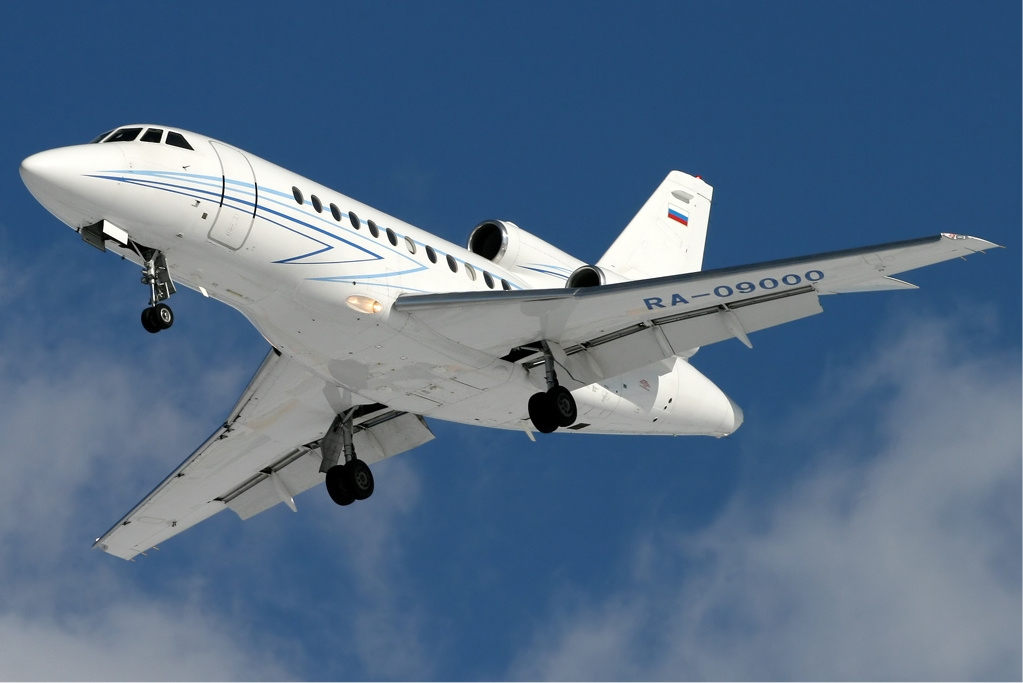
Gazpromavia Dassault Falcon 900

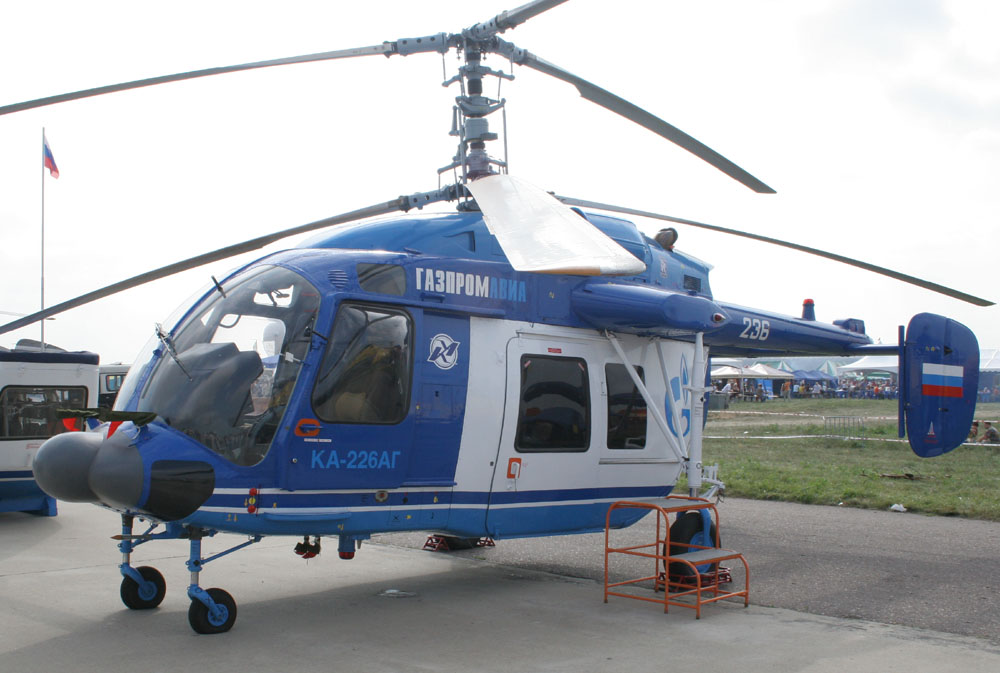
Gazpromavia Ka-226AG at MAKS 2007

As of January 2018, Gazpromavia fleet consists on the following aircraft:

Gazpromavia fleet
Aircraft	In fleet	Orders	Passengers				Notes
Aircraft	In fleet	Orders	F	J	Y	Total	Notes
Boeing 737-700	2	—	—	20	102	122	(as of August 2025)
Dassault Falcon 900	4	1	8	—	—	8	VIP
Sukhoi Superjet 100	7	—	—	—	90	90	(as of August 2025)
Yakovlev Yak-40	4	—	—	16	—	16	Saloon variant
Total	17	1					

=== Helicopter fleet ===
As of January 2018, Gazpromavia operates the following fleet of helicopters:

Gazpromavia helicopter fleet
Aircraft	In fleet	Orders	Passengers	Notes
Eurocopter EC135	8	—	7	
Kamov Ka-26	22	—	7	
Mil Mi-2	39	—	8	
Mil Mi-8	45	—	9	
Total	106	—		

== See also ==
- SonAir
