= 2012 Mount Salak Sukhoi Superjet crash =

2012 aviation accident in Indonesia

2012 Mount Salak Sukhoi Superjet crash Sukhoi Civil Aircraft Flight 36801
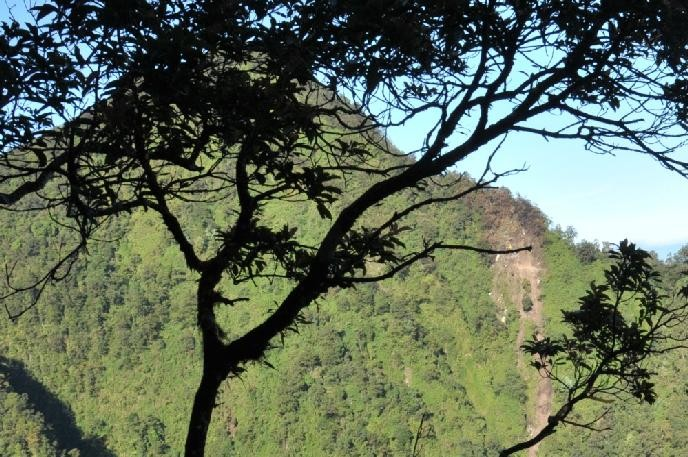
- The eastern face of Mount Salak, showing where the aircraft impacted the slope

Accident
- Date: 9 May 2012
- Summary: Controlled flight into terrain due to pilot error and loss of situational awareness
- Site: Mount Salak, Indonesia; 6°42′45″S 106°44′5″E

Aircraft
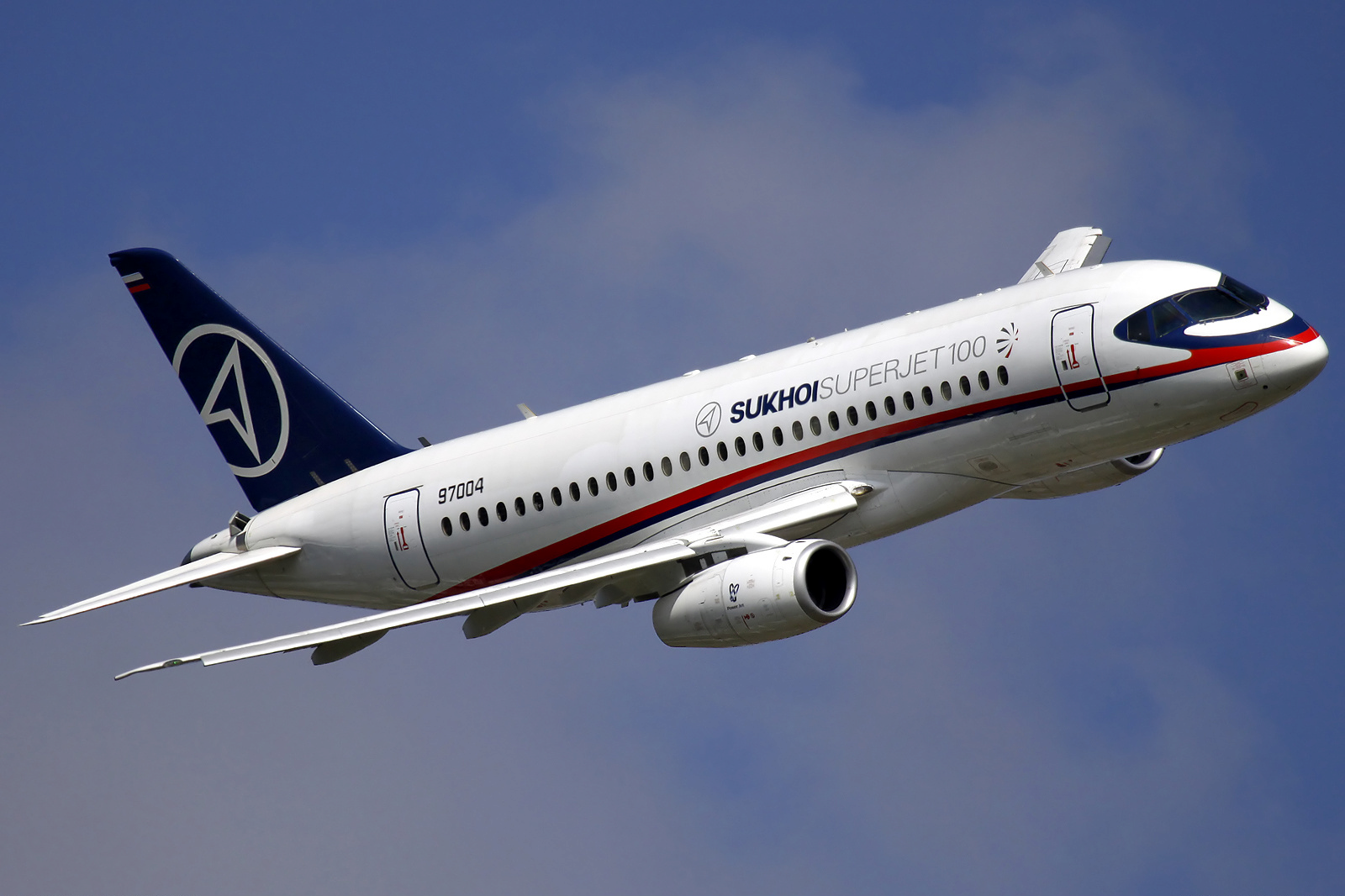
- 97004, the aircraft involved in the accident, photographed in 2011
- Aircraft type: Sukhoi Superjet 100-95
- Operator: Sukhoi
- IATA flight No.: RA36801
- Registration: 97004
- Flight origin: Halim Perdanakusuma Airport, Jakarta, Indonesia
- Destination: Halim Perdanakusuma Airport, Jakarta, Indonesia
- Occupants: 45
- Passengers: 37
- Crew: 8
- Fatalities: 45
- Survivors: 0

On 9 May 2012, Sukhoi Civil Aircraft Flight 36801, a Sukhoi Superjet 100 airliner on a demonstration tour in Indonesia crashed into Mount Salak, in the province of West Java. All 37 passengers and 8 crew on board were killed. The plane had taken off minutes before from Jakarta's Halim Airport on a promotional flight for the recently launched jet, and was carrying Sukhoi personnel and representatives of various local airlines.

The subsequent investigation concluded that the flight crew was unaware of the presence of high ground in the area and ignored warnings from the terrain warning system, incorrectly attributing them to a system malfunction while their view was obstructed because of thick cloud cover. It was also established that in the minutes leading to the accident, the crew, including the captain, were engaged in conversation with prospective customers present in the cockpit. The crash was both the first hull loss and the first fatal accident involving a Sukhoi Superjet 100.

== Background ==
=== Aircraft ===
The aircraft involved in the accident was a Sukhoi Superjet 100, registration 97004, msn 95004. The aircraft was manufactured in 2009 and had accumulated over 800 flight hours at the time of the accident. The Superjet 100 is the first production airliner model produced in Russia since the dissolution of the USSR in 1991.

=== Demonstration tour ===
The jet was flying as part of a "Welcome Asia!" demonstration tour. With a different jet, a demo flight had been flown successfully in Kazakhstan, but when the tour moved to Pakistan, potential buyers could see the aircraft only on the runway as no flight took place, reportedly due to a technical glitch. A leak in a 'nozzle in the engine' was found in this plane on the way to Myanmar, according to Alexander Tulyakov, vice-president of the United Aircraft Corporation, and it returned to Moscow. The aircraft involved in the accident was then flown in as a replacement to continue the tour. It had been scheduled to visit Laos and Vietnam. At the time of the crash, Sukhoi had 42 orders of the type from Indonesia, 170 in total, and was hoping to produce up to 1,000 aircraft.

=== Mount Salak ===
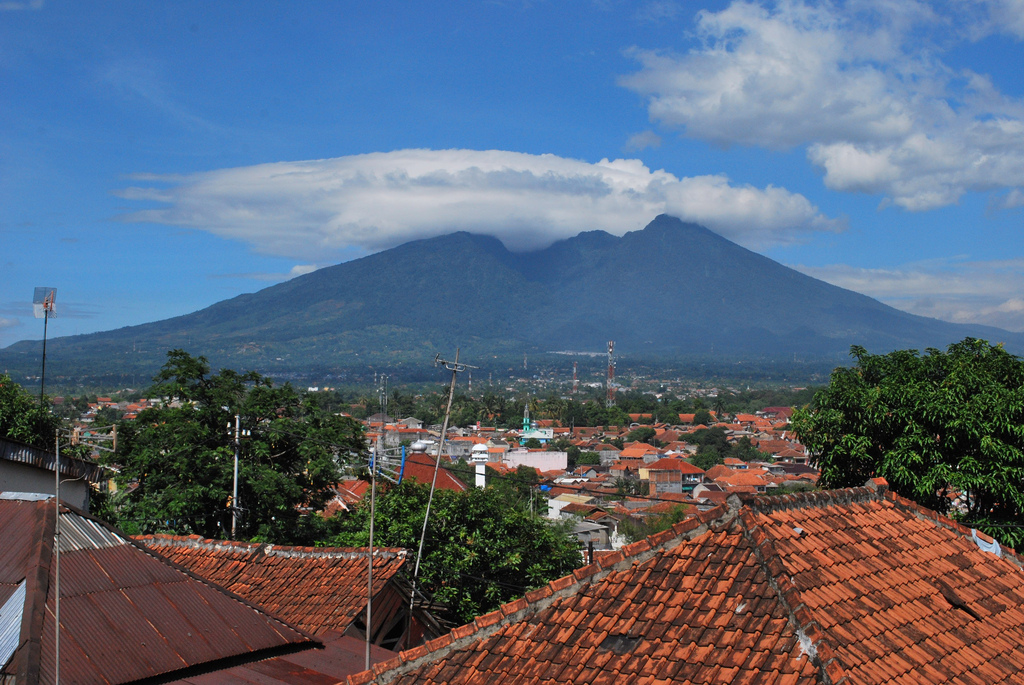
A view of Mount Salak from Bogor

In the decade between 2002 and 2012, there were seven aviation crashes in the area of Mount Salak. Three people were killed in a crash of a training aircraft not long before the SSJ-100 accident; 18 people were killed in a crash of an Indonesian Air Force military aircraft in 2008; five people were killed in a crash in June 2004, two in April 2004, seven in October 2003, and one in October 2002.

The Jakarta Post has dubbed Mount Salak "an airplane graveyard". High turbulence and fast-changing weather conditions of the mountainous terrain are cited as contributing factors to multiple aviation crashes in the area.

== Accident ==
Location of crash site in Indonesia

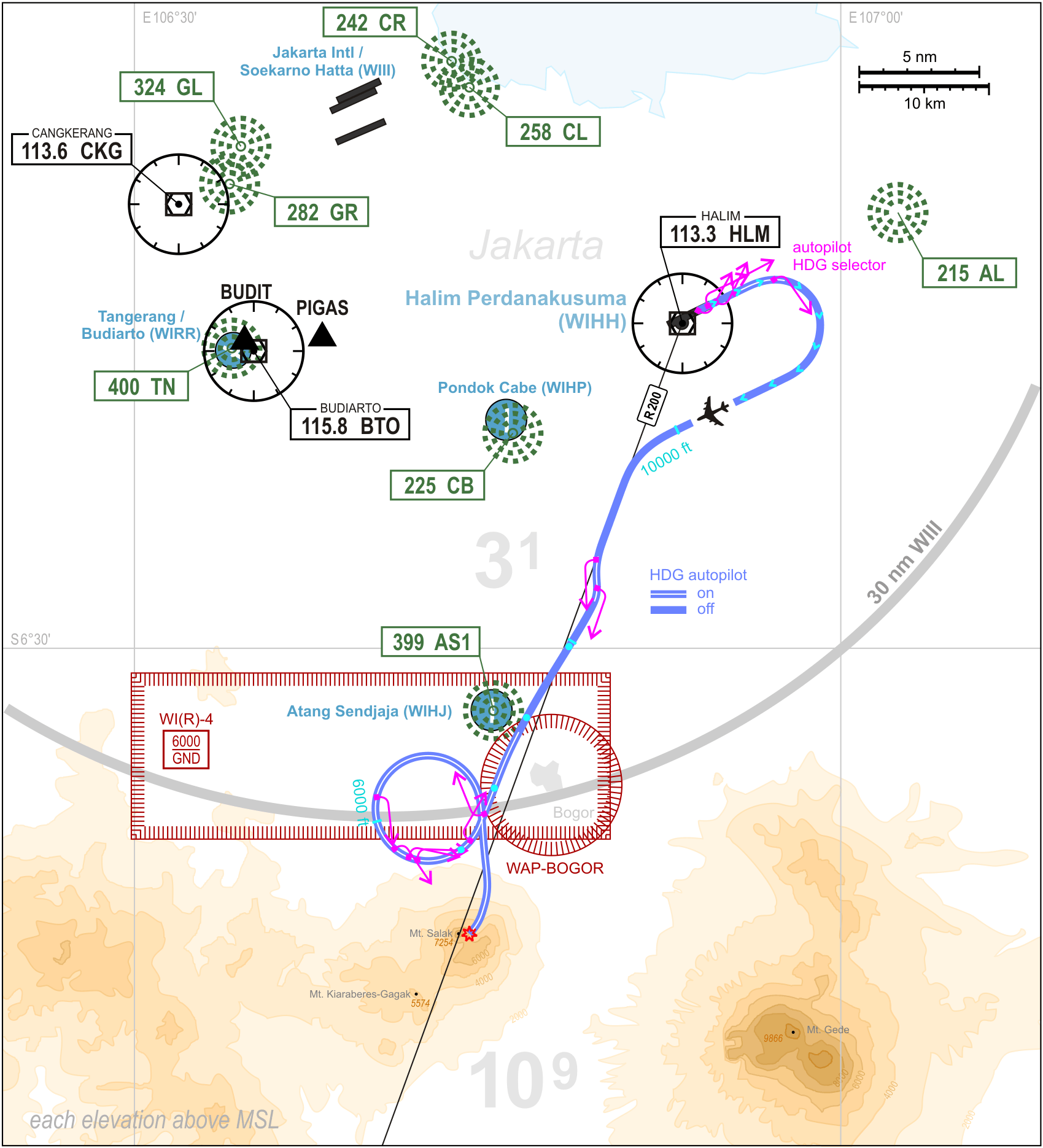
The flight path of 97004

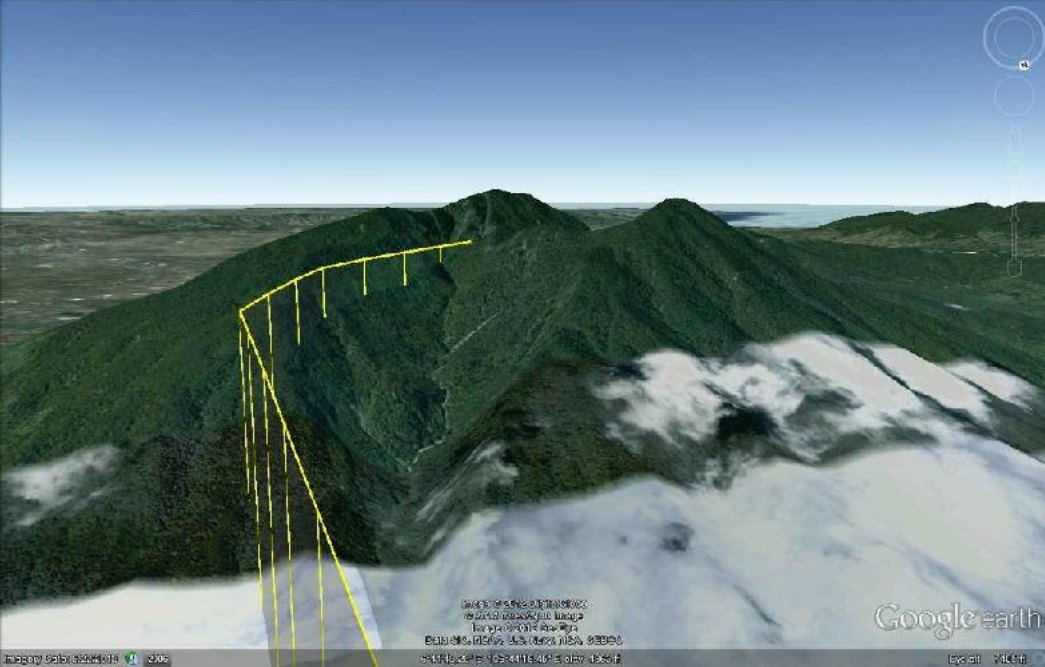
The trajectory of the flight

At 14:00 local time (07:00 UTC), the SSJ-100 departed from Halim Perdanakusuma Airport for a local demonstration flight, and was due to return to the departure point. This was the second demonstration flight the aircraft was operating that day. There were six crew, two representatives from Sukhoi and 37 passengers on board. Amongst the passengers were representatives from Aviastar Mandiri, Batavia Air, Pelita Air Service and Sriwijaya Air. At 14:26 (07:26 UTC), the crew requested permission to descend from 10,000 feet (3,000 m) to 6,000 feet (1,800 m), and this was granted. Two minutes later, the crew requested and were approved to "orbit to the right." This was the last contact that Air Traffic Control had with the aircraft, which was then about 75 nautical miles (86 mi; 139 km) south of Jakarta, in the vicinity of 7,254-foot-high (2,211 m) Mount Salak, a mountain higher than the requested flight level. Four minutes after beginning the orbit, the aircraft's Enhanced Ground Proximity Warning System sent out a single "Terrain Ahead, Pull Up" audio alert, warning the crew that their predicted flight path would require a climb to avoid terrain. Immediately after, the warning changed to an "Avoid Terrain" message, which is triggered when the aircraft would also need to be turned to avoid oncoming terrain. While the latter message sounded repeatedly, the pilots briefly discussed the warning and disabled it, believing it to be a problem with the system's terrain database. Less than 30 seconds later, the airplane's aural warning system sounded a "Gear Not Down" alert, which is independent of the EGPWS and signifies the aircraft being too close to the ground without its landing gear lowered. The captain then disengaged the autopilot and put the airplane into a slight nose-up attitude; this was not consistent with an evasive maneuver, and the reason for this input was not conclusively determined. The captain tells the first officer that the autopilot is off, and impact with terrain occurred two seconds later, at 14:33 local time (07:33 UTC).

A ground-and-air search for the aircraft was initiated, but was called off as night fell. On 10 May (the following day) at 09:00 (02:00 UTC), the wreckage of the Sukhoi Superjet was found on Mount Salak. It is only known that the aircraft had been flying on a clockwise flightpath around the mountain, towards Jakarta, before the crash. Preliminary reports indicated that the aircraft had hit the edge of a cliff at an elevation of 6,270 feet (1,910 m), slid down a slope and came to rest at an elevation of 5,200 feet (1,600 m). The site of the accident was not accessible by air and no rescuers had reached the site by nightfall on 10 May. Multiple groups of rescue personnel attempted to reach the wreckage on foot.

== Victims ==
Nationality	Passengers	Crew	Total
Indonesia	35	-	35
Russia	-	8	8
United States	1	-	1
France	1	-	1
Total	37	8	45

Most of the passengers were journalists and prospective clients. The 45 people on board included 14 people from the Indonesian airline Sky Aviation, Captain Aan Husdiana (Director of Operations for Kartika Airlines) and five reporters, Dody Aviantara (journalist) and Didik Nur Yusuf (photographer) from Angkasa aviation magazine, Ismiati Soenarto and Aditya Sukardi of Trans TV and Femi Adi of the American Bloomberg News. An accomplished and experienced pilot, Peter Adler held a US passport, acting as a consultant and a passenger on the flight; according to Vladimir Prisyazhnyuk, the head of Sukhoi Civil Aircraft, two Italians and one French citizen of Vietnamese descent were also on board. The captain of the jet was Alexander Yablontsev (57), a former Russian combat pilot, test pilot, and cosmonaut. He had been involved in the Buran space program, and was the pilot for the first flight of Superjet 100 in 2008. The first officer was Alexander Kotchetkov (44) and the flight navigator was Oleg Shvetsov (51).

== Investigation ==
One day after the crash, Russian Prime Minister Dmitry Medvedev set up a commission to investigate the cause of the accident. According to the National Transportation Safety Committee (NTSC), the Indonesian agency for the investigation of civil aircraft accidents, analysis of the crash would take up to 12 months. On 15 May 2012, it was reported in the local media that the Indonesian government had turned down Russia's request to send back the flight data recorder, stating that Indonesian investigators would determine the cause of the crash, while Russian experts would provide support only. The cockpit voice recorder was found on 15 May 2012 at a distance of 200 metres (660 ft) from the tail section. The flight data recorder was found on 31 May 2012 also at a distance of 200 metres from the tail section.

The Indonesian NTSC had released their preliminary report, which listed factual findings but did not attempt to determine the cause of the accident. According to sources within the investigating committee, the aircraft was in full working order and the incident was ascribed to human error.

The final report was released 18 December 2012. Crash investigators determined that the plane's terrain warning system had been functioning correctly and had warned the pilots about the impending collision with the mountain. The pilots, however, turned the system off, believing that it was malfunctioning, even though their view of the surrounding area was obstructed by thick cloud cover. Furthermore, the pilots were distracted by conversation on the flight deck unrelated to flying the plane, which contributed to their failure to notice that the plane was in danger. The investigation also found that the pilots were unaware of the terrain in the area because they lacked the proper charts for the area. A contributing factor was the lack of a Minimum Safe Altitude Warning System at the airport and the air traffic controller being too overworked to notice the impending crash.

== Aftermath ==
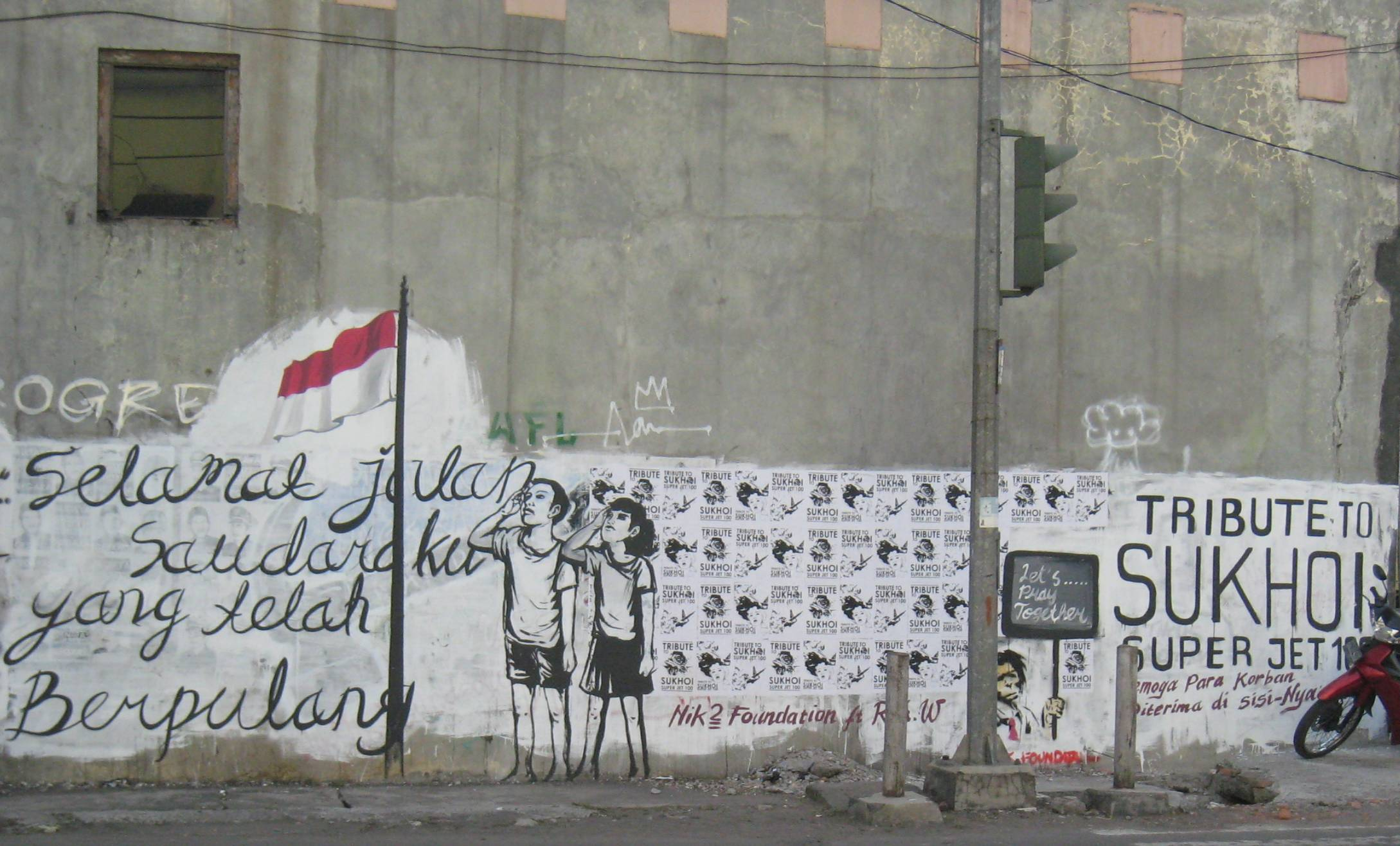
Mural in Solo commemorating the accident

Sky Aviation, an Indonesian air carrier, delayed the delivery of 12 Superjet 100s following the accident. Arifin Seman, the commissioner of Kartika Airlines, another domestic Indonesian carrier, went on record to say that the delivery of 30 Superjet 100s, which his company had ordered, would likely be delayed following the crash. Several days later, however, the same source published Sky Aviation's statement in which they declared that they were not going to cancel the contract. Moreover, Sky Aviation's general manager for promotion, Sutito Zainuddin, added that "the additional 100-seat planes would be needed to connect major cities in Indonesia, particularly Jakarta". Mexico's Interjet Board chairman Miguel Alemаn Velasco said the crash had no influence on the company's desire to purchase additional Superjets.

Russian airline Aeroflot and Armenian Armavia were the only two operators of the SSJ-100 at the time of the crash, but had not suspended operations of the type. Armavia said that it would continue negotiations over the purchase of another Superjet 100 for its fleet, but the airline ceased operations later in 2013.

== In popular culture ==
The documentary television series Mayday covered the accident in the 2018 episode "Deadly Display".

== See also ==
- Sterile flight deck rule
