= Yamburg Airport =

Airport in Russia

- IATA: none; ICAO: USMQ

Summary
- Airport type: Public
- Operator: Gazpromavia
- Location: Yamburg, Yamalo-Nenets Autonomous Okrug, Russia
- Elevation AMSL: 33 m / 108 ft
- Coordinates: 67°59′19″N 75°05′54″E

Maps
- Yamalo-Nenets Autonomous Okrug in Russia

- Location of the airport in Yamalo-Nenets

Runways
Direction	Length		Surface
Direction	m	ft	Surface
13/31	2,430	7,972	Concrete
- Sources: GCM

Yamburg Airport (ICAO: USMQ) is a small airport in Yamalo-Nenets Autonomous Okrug, Russia located 21 kilometres (13 mi) northwest of Yamburg. It services medium-sized airliners and helicopters of all types. The Yamburg area is located in remote area of northern Siberia in the Vorkuta region and is 90 kilometres (56 mi) southeast of Cape Kameny Cape.

== Airlines and destinations ==
Airlines	Destinations
Gazpromavia	Charter: Moscow–Vnukovo, Tyumen, Ufa

== See also ==
- Vorkuta Airport
