= Tuva Airlines =

Russian airline

IATA	ICAO	Call sign
-	—	AIR TYVA
- Founded: 1992; 34 years ago
- Ceased operations: 2016
- Hubs: Kyzyl Airport
- Destinations: 7
- Headquarters: Kyzyl, Russia

Tuva Airlines (Russian: ОАО «Тувинские Авиалинии», romanized: OAO «Tuvinskije Avialinii») was an airline based in Kyzyl, in the Russian federal republic of Tuva.

== History ==
The airline was established and started operations in 1932 as a division of Aeroflot. It was privatised in 1992, being owned by the state (51%) and the airline's employees (49%).

In 1994, the airline's director general Anatoly Martshekhi was found dead in his bath, in an apparent organised crime killing.

Tuva Airlines went bankrupt in 2016.

== Destinations ==
Tuva Airlines operated the following services as of January 2012:

Russia

- Chamsara - Chamsara Airport
- Irkutsk - Irkutsk Airport
- Krasnoyarsk - Yemelyanovo Airport
- Kyzyl - Kyzyl Airport base
- Novosibirsk - Tolmachevo Airport
- Todzha - Todzha Airport
- Ulan-Ude - Ulan-Ude Airport
- Yrban - Yrban Airport

=== Terminated Routes ===
Russia

- Moscow -
  - Sheremetyevo International Airport since 1995
  - Domodedovo International Airport since 2000
- St. Petersburg - Pulkovo Airport since 2000

== Fleet ==
- Antonov An-2
- Yakovlev Yak-40
- Sukhoi Superjet 100 (10 aircraft since 2016)
