= Kartika Airlines =

Airline of Indonesia

IATA	ICAO	Call sign
3Y	KAE	KARTIKA
- Founded: 2001
- Ceased operations: 2010
- Hubs: Halim Perdanakusuma Airport, Minangkabau International Airport
- Fleet size: 5
- Destinations: 5
- Headquarters: Jakarta, Indonesia
- Website: kartika-airlines.com

Kartika Airlines was an airline based in Jakarta, Indonesia. It operated domestic services from Jakarta. Its main base was Soekarno-Hatta International Airport, Jakarta. Kartika Airlines was listed in category 2 by Indonesian Civil Aviation Authority for airline safety quality.

== History ==
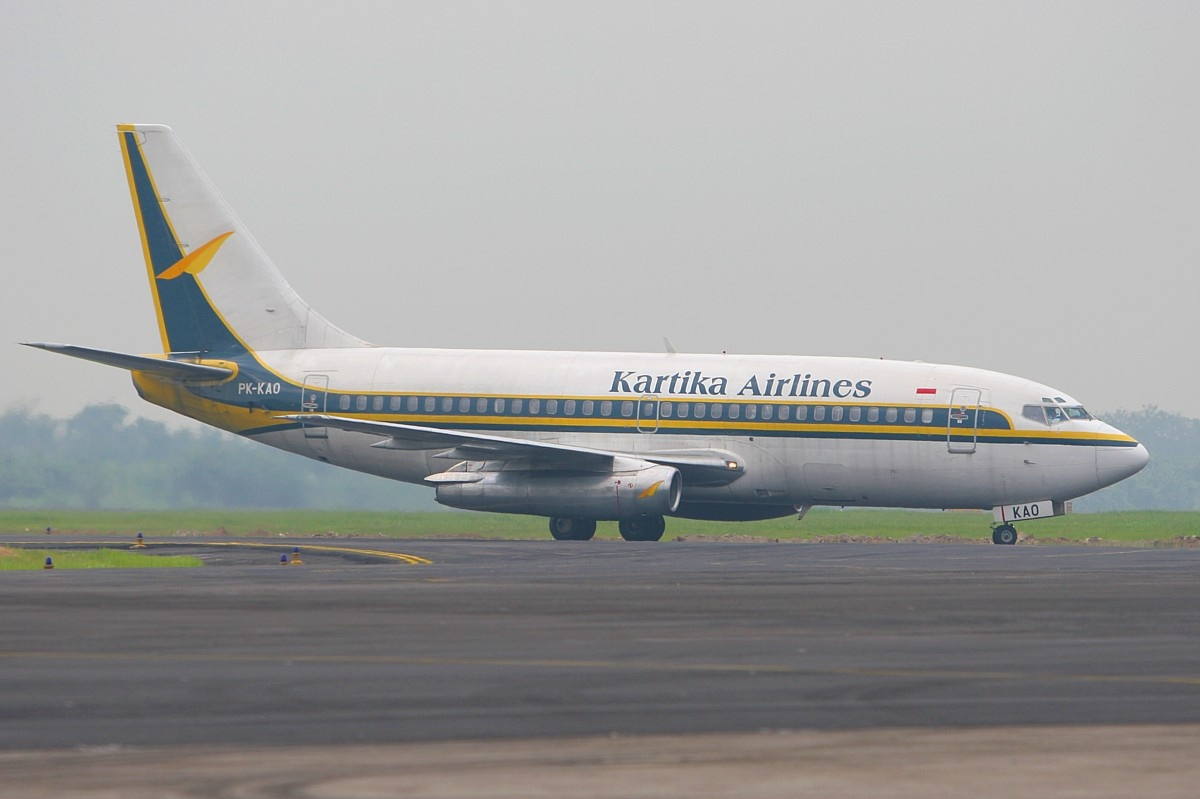
A Kartika Airlines Boeing 737-200 Advanced at Polonia International Airport. (2006)

The airline was established in 2001 and started operations on 15 May 2001. It was wholly owned by PT Truba. The airline was grounded in November 2004 and resumed services on 15 June 2005, before finally ceasing operations in 2010. Kartika Airlines was among the Indonesian carriers blacklisted by the European Union.

== Destinations ==
Before its shutdown, Kartika Airlines flew to the following destinations:

- Jakarta – Halim Perdanakusuma Airport Hub
- Jakarta – Soekarno-Hatta International Airport
- Medan – Polonia Airport
- Palembang – Sultan Mahmud Badaruddin II Airport
- Semarang – Semarang Airport
- Yogyakarta – Adisutjipto International Airport
- Pangkalan Bun – Iskandar Airport
- Padang – Minangkabau International Airport

== Terminated destinations ==
Indonesia

- Balikpapan
- Banjarmasin
- Denpasar
- Makassar
- Manado
- Padang
- Palangka Raya
- Pontianak
- Semarang
- Surabaya
- Tarakan
- Ternate

Malaysia

- Penang
- Kuala Lumpur
- Ipoh
- Johor Bahru

Hong Kong

Singapore

Taiwan

- Taipei

== Fleet ==
The Kartika Airlines fleet included the following aircraft:

Kartika Airlines fleet
Aircraft	In Fleet	Orders	Passengers	Routes
Boeing 737-200	3	0	118	Domestic routes
Boeing 737-400	1	0	168	Domestic routes
McDonnell Douglas MD-83	1	0	172	Domestic routes
Sukhoi Superjet 100	0	15	100	Domestic routes
Total	5	15		
