= Cibuntu =

Village in West Java, Indonesia

Coordinates: 6.83513°S 108.44073°E

Cibuntu is a village in the Cigandamekar district of Kuningan regency, in the province of West Java, Indonesia. The village has a population of 2,332 as of the Indonesia 2010 census.
