= Yamburg, Yamalo-Nenets Autonomous Okrug =

Yamburg Ямбург
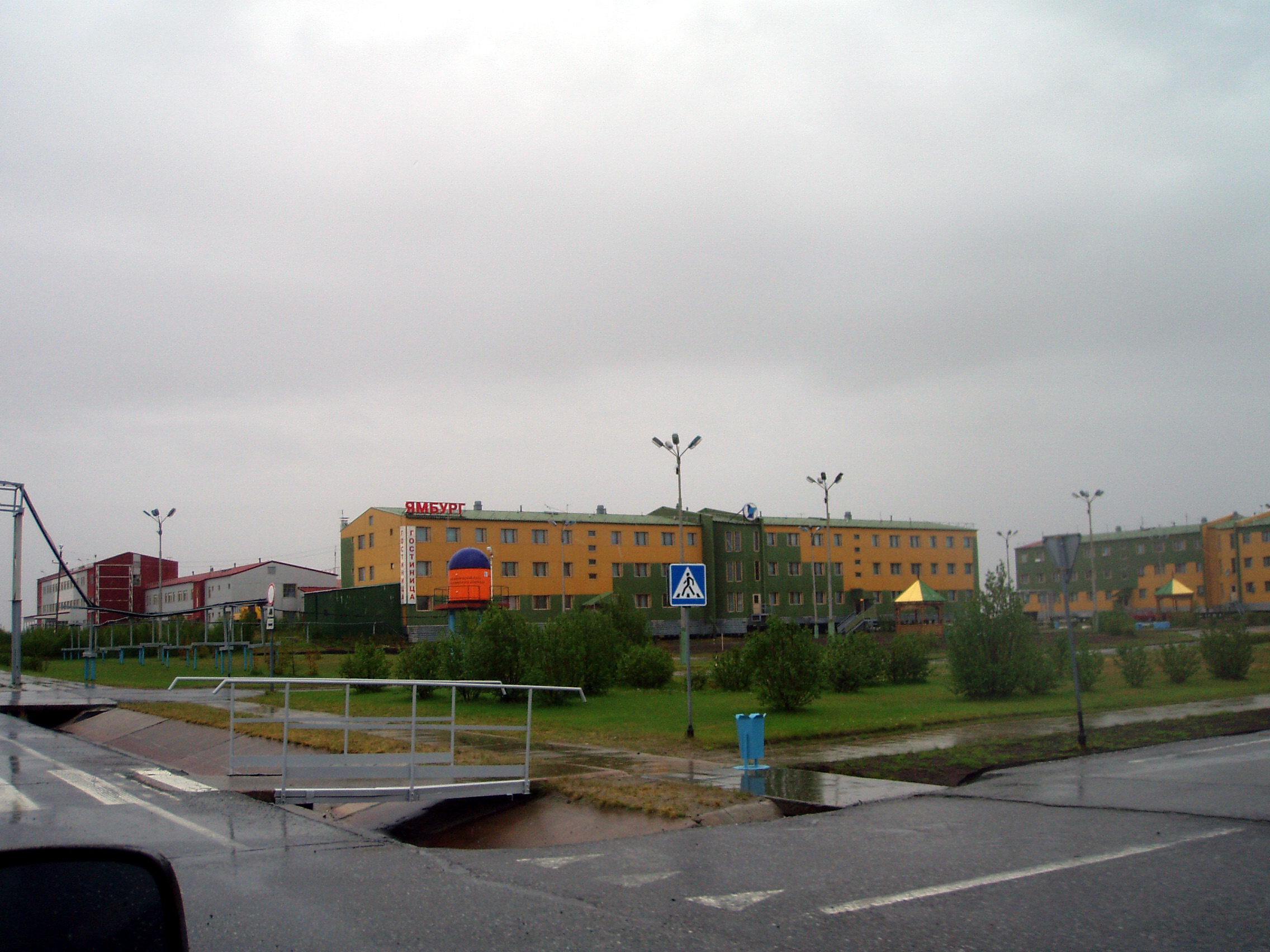
- View of the town
- Interactive map of Yamburg
- Location of Yamburg Yamburg (Yamalo-Nenets Autonomous Okrug)
- Coordinates: 67.904565°N 74.856606°E
- Country: Russia
- Federal subject: Yamalo-Nenets Autonomous Okrug
- Administrative district: Nadymsky District
- Founded: Early 1980s
- Elevation: 6 m (20 ft)

Population
  - Estimate (2019): 95 )
- Time zone: UTC+5 (MSK+2)
- Postal code: 629740
- OKTMO ID: 71916701902

Yamburg (Russian: Ямбург) is a rural locality (a settlement) in Nadymsky District of Yamalo-Nenets Autonomous Okrug of Russia, 148.5 kilometres (92.3 mi) north of the Arctic Circle on the Gulf of Ob.

The name of the settlement is derived from the Yamburg gas field, which was discovered in 1969. Yamburg was constructed in the early 1980s as the base of operations for the exploration and development of the gas field. Yamburg is a company town, de facto a shift town, and the vast majority of its 5,000–6,000 inhabitants are employees of Gazprom. The settlement is well served by transport infrastructure, including an airport, as well as river, motor and railway connections to other points in Russia.

== Gallery ==
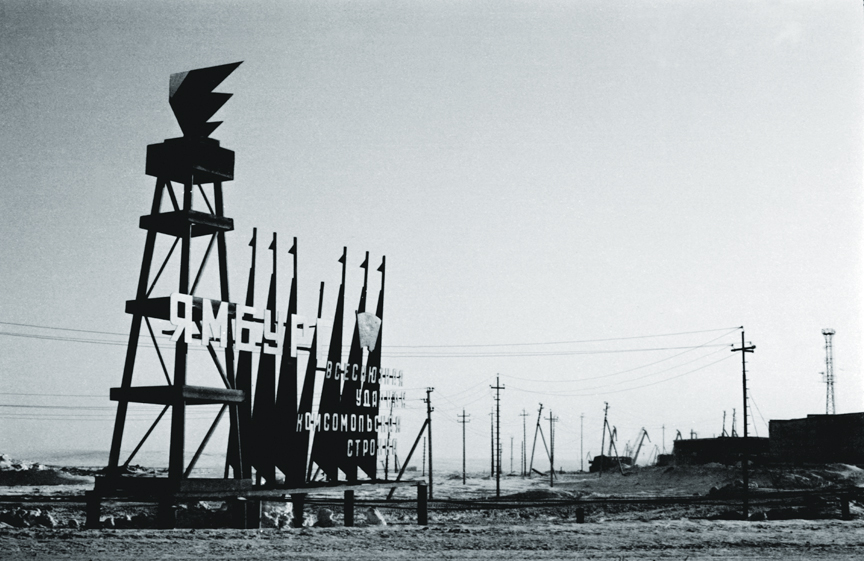
Entry

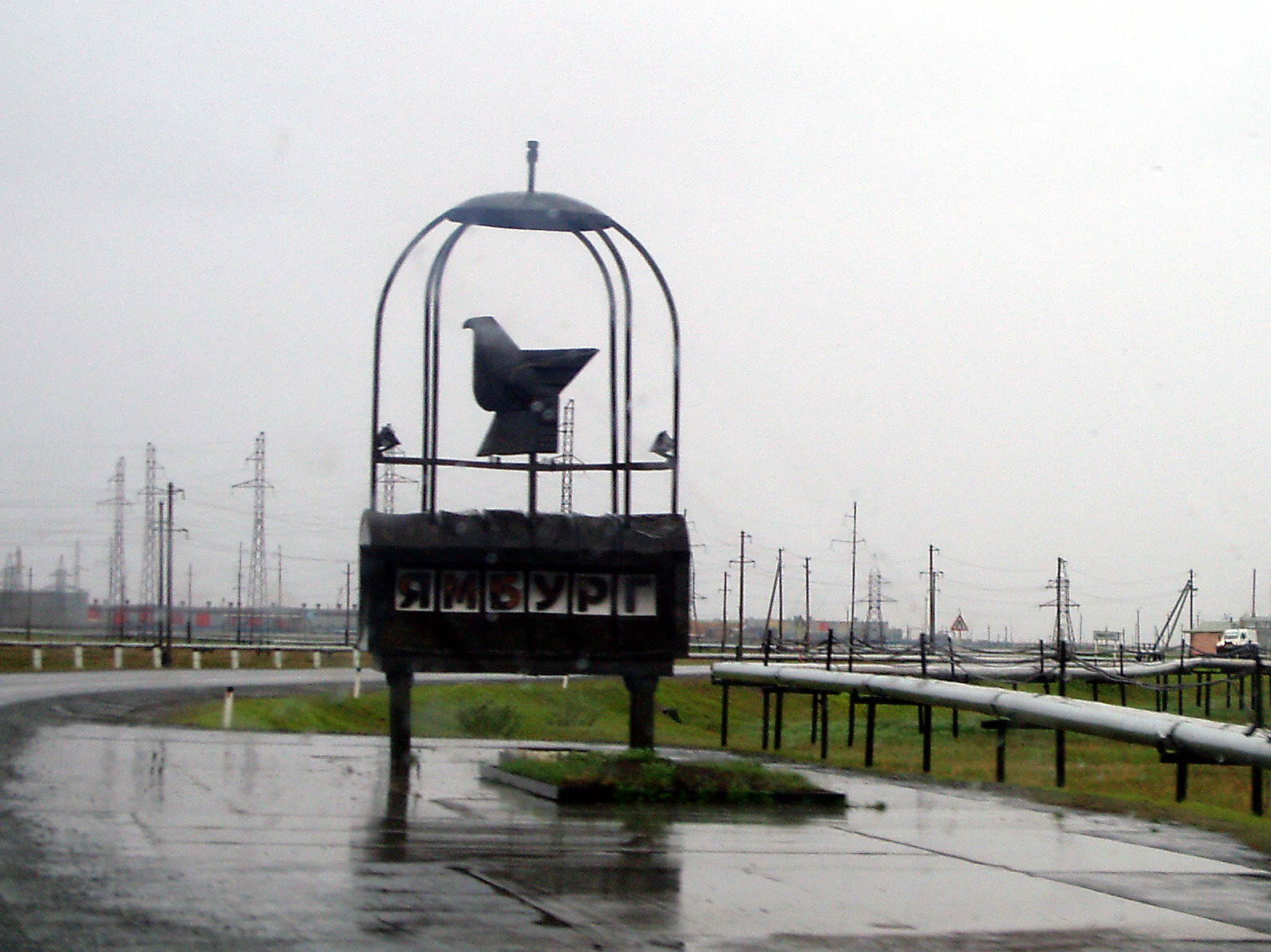
Yamburg

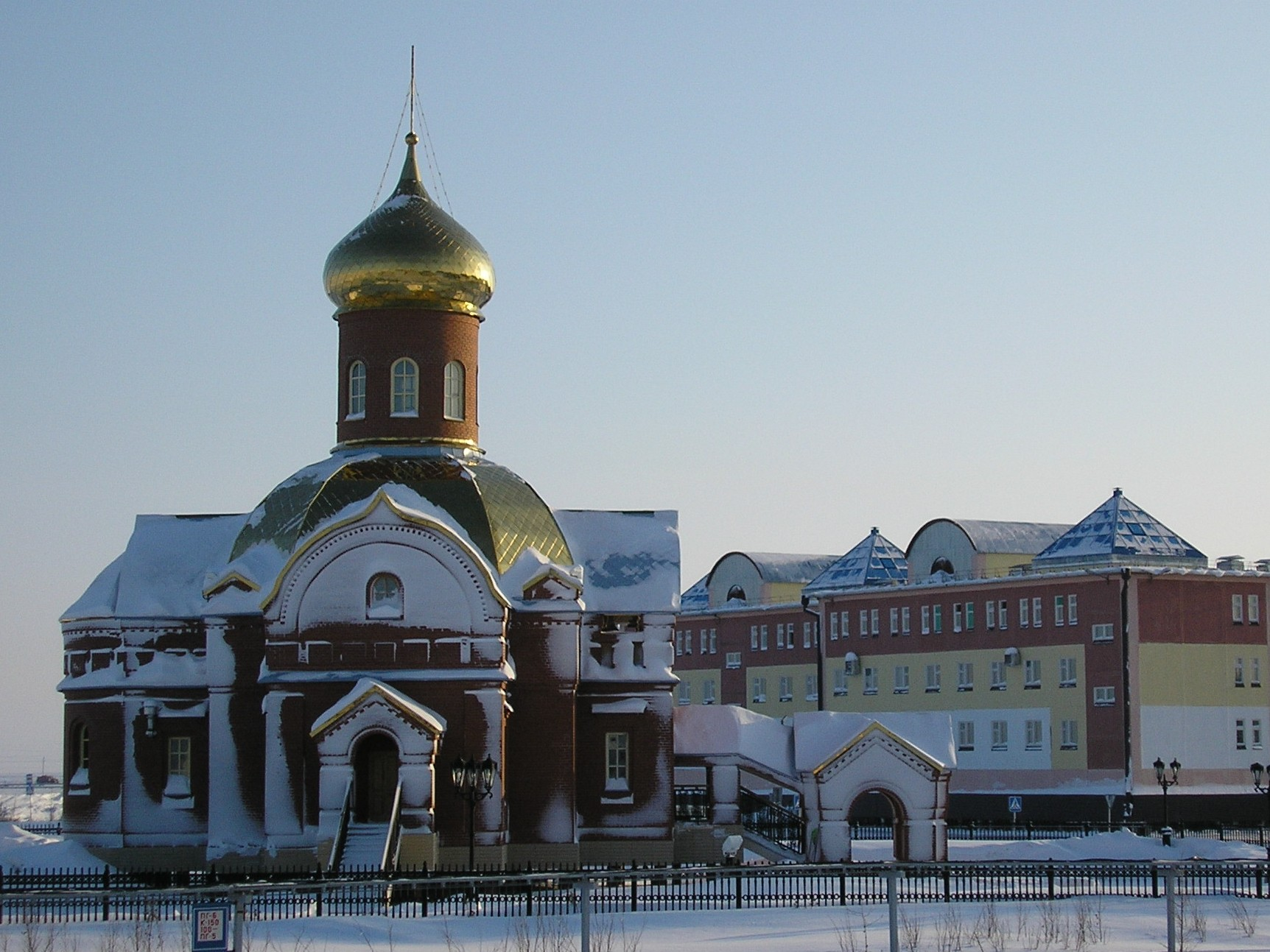
Church

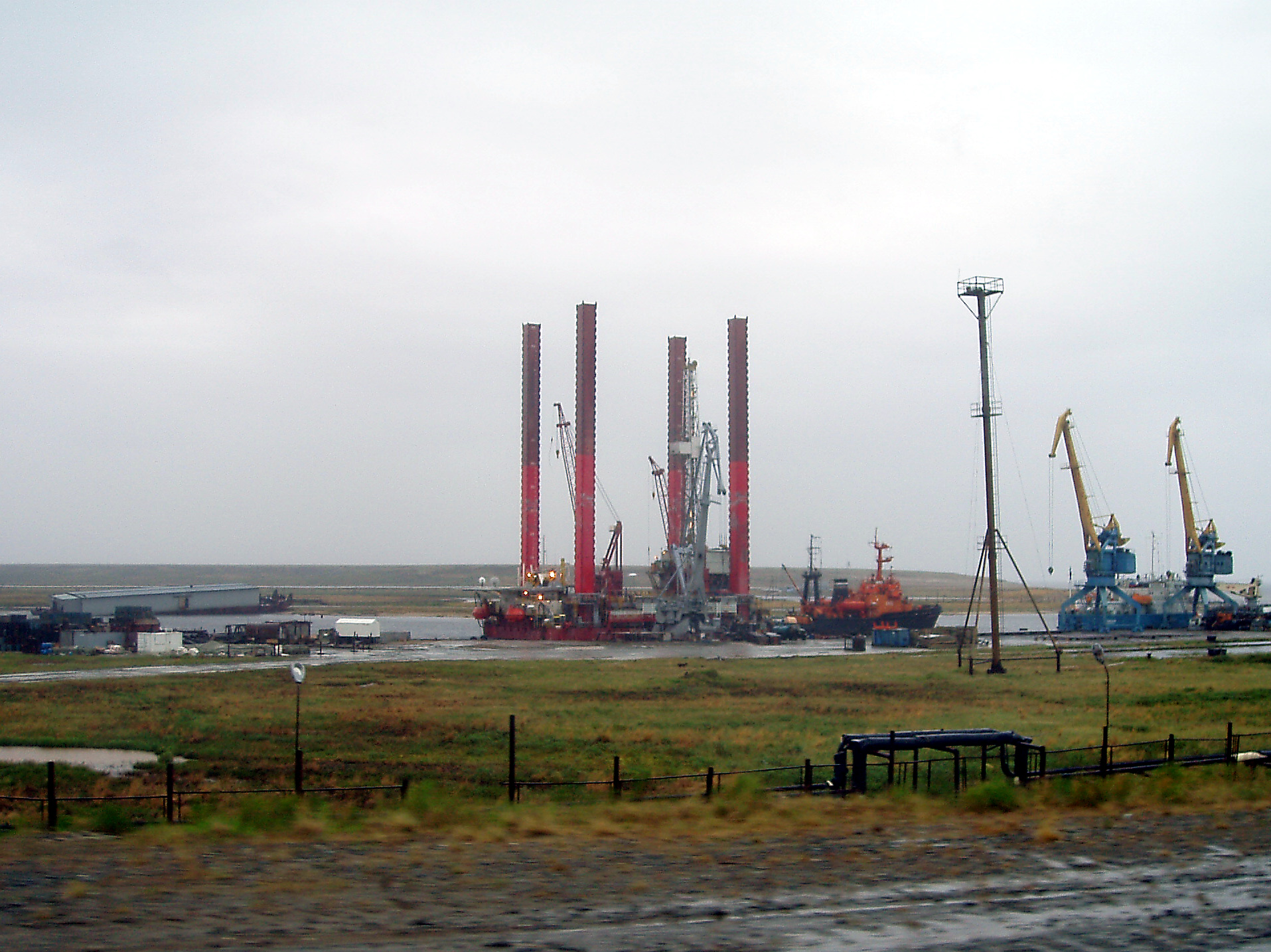
Harbor

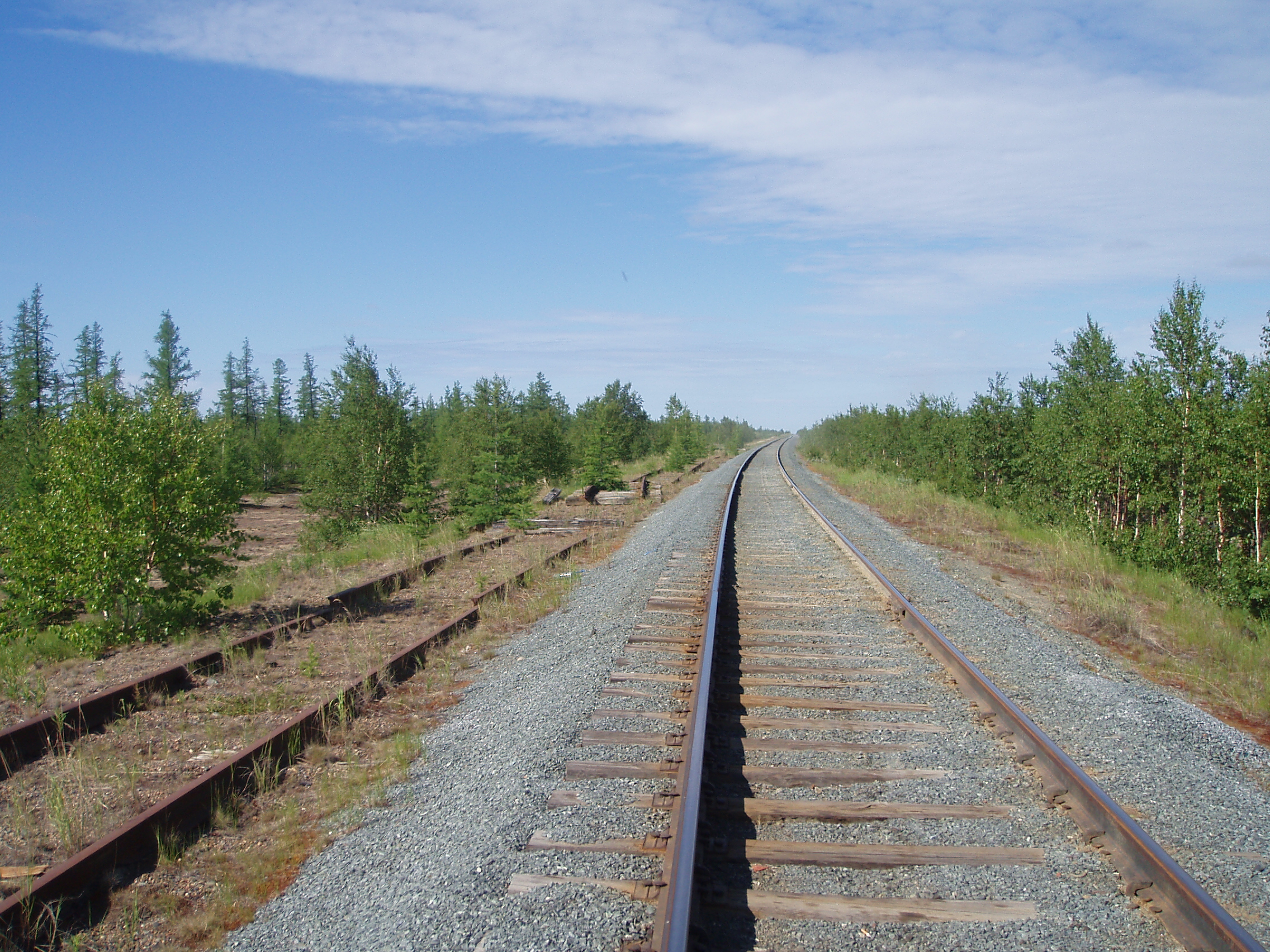
Railway

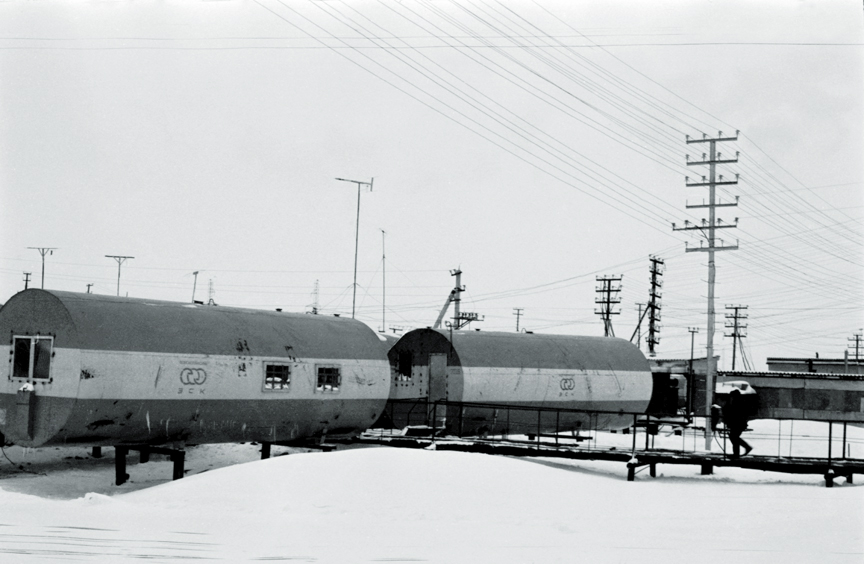
Modular dwellings

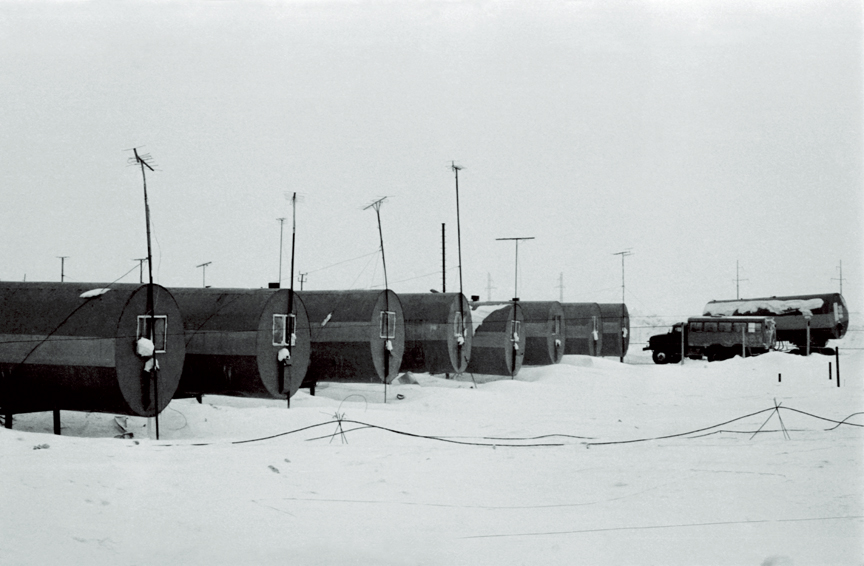
Modular dwellings
