= Superjet =

Superjet may refer to:

- Sukhoi Superjet, a jet aircraft manufactured by Sukhoi Company of Russia
- SuperJet International, an Italy-based venture between Alenia Aermacchi and Sukhoi Holding
- Superjet Lines, an Egyptian bus line operating in a number of Arab countries
- Yamaha SuperJet, a personal watercraft made by Yamaha Motor Corporation
