= NPO Saturn PD-8 =

2020s Russian turbofan aircraft engine

PD-8
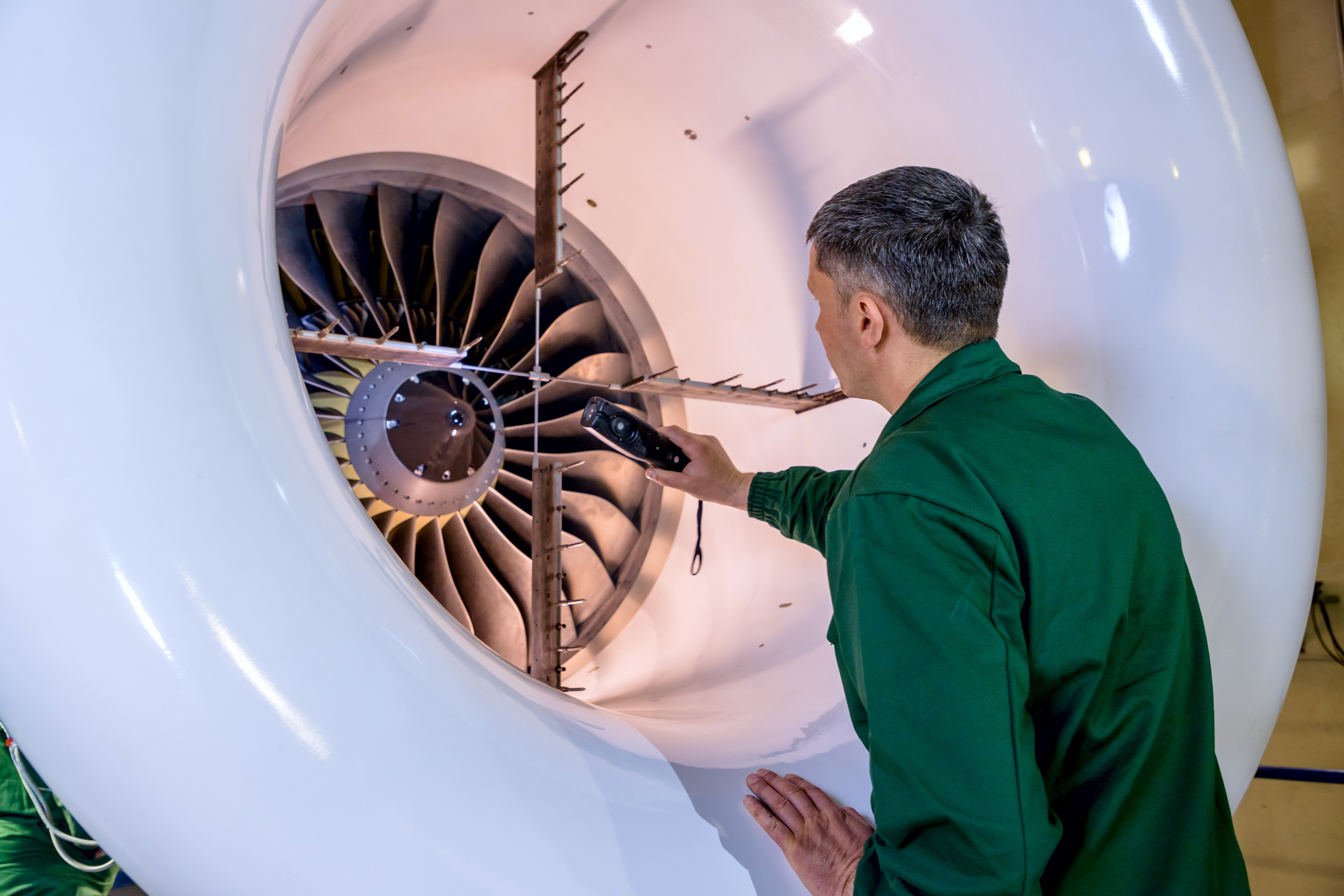
- PD-8 during development
- Type: Turbofan
- National origin: Russia
- Manufacturer: UEC Saturn
- Major applications: Yakovlev SJ-100; Beriev Be-200
- Manufactured: 2026–present
- Developed from: Aviadvigatel PD-14; PowerJet SaM146

The PD-8 (Russian: ПД-8, lit. 'Prospective Engine with 8 tonnes of thrust') is a modern Russian turbofan aircraft engine. It was developed on the basis of PD-14 and SaM146 engines. The PD-8 is intended to replace imported engines on the Yakovlev SJ-100 and Beriev Be-200 aircraft.

Flight testing of the engine on a testbed aircraft began in December 2022. The first flight of an SJ-100 prototype equipped with PD-8 engines took place in 2025. Certification deadlines were repeatedly postponed; the type certificate was issued in early June 2026. Full-scale production of the engines began in June 2026.

== Development ==
Under the original 2021 schedule, the engine's preliminary design was to be completed in 2021, detailed design documentation in 2022, and preparation for production of demonstrator powerplants (MDU) in 2023. Prototype demonstrators were to be manufactured in 2024, with a type certificate expected the same year. Approximately half of the allocated funding for the Sukhoi Superjet New program (120 billion rubles, or about US$1.6 billion at the 2021 exchange rate) was to be spent on the engine's development.

In May 2021, testing of the engine's gas generator was underway; by the end of September 2021, testing of the second gas generator prototype was completed. In February 2022, the Baranov Central Institute of Aviation Motors (CIAM) carried out the first stage of gas generator tests, simulating flight conditions at altitudes up to 12,000 m. By the end of February, the Salyut Machine-Building Association had manufactured the engine demonstrator's drive unit, comprising the central drive, accessory gearbox, and angular bevel gear. In 2022, it was planned to assemble units for the pilot batch of engines. The start of testing of the PD-8 demonstrator with installed units was planned for March. In March 2022, Minister of Industry and Trade Denis Manturov ordered a shortening of the development timeline for the SJ-100 and, above all, an acceleration of the PD-8's certification within the next 12–14 months. Certification was targeted for 2023. In May 2023, Energomash delivered the first of six experimental combustors for the PD-8, built under a contract signed with the UAC in August 2022.

=== Flight testing and certification ===
In December 2022, flight testing of the engine began on an Ilyushin Il-76LL testbed aircraft at the Gromov Flight Research Institute in Zhukovsky. Testing proceeded in parallel at three sites: ground test benches in Rybinsk, CIAM's altitude test chamber, and the testbed aircraft. In October 2023, it was reported that PD-8 engines had been installed on an SJ-100 prototype (msn 97003) and ground-run, with UEC's approval for the first flight still pending. This aircraft was the third SJ-100 prototype and the first in a fully import-substituted configuration, with about 40 imported systems and components replaced.

In late December 2023, UEC stated that testing had revealed the need for additional work on the PD-8 to ensure its reliability in all modes and guarantee operational safety. According to AviaPort, while assessing throttle response on the testbed aircraft, engineers observed unstable engine operation during transients: although the powerplant could follow smooth movement of the thrust lever, the airframers required the engine to respond to throttle inputs without delay. Meeting this requirement called for increasing the compressor's gas dynamic stability margin and modifying the geometry of the high-pressure turbine nozzle guide vanes. After joint engineering work in which specialists from Perm assisted the Rybinsk team, an optimized design was developed, and updated hardware was manufactured and entered testing in the second half of 2024. According to AviaPort, the redesigned PD-8 offered better throttle response and controllability than the SaM146.

In mid-February 2025, ground testing began on an SJ-100 prototype fitted with PD-8 engines. On 17 March 2025, the aircraft made its first flight in Komsomolsk-on-Amur; the flight lasted about 40 minutes, reaching speeds of up to 500 km/h and altitudes of up to 3,000 m. On 8 April, in another test flight, the SJ-100 with PD-8 engines reached an altitude of 11,300 m and Mach 0.78; the flight lasted 3 hours 13 minutes. Certification of the PD-8 was planned for November 2025 but was postponed to the first quarter of 2026.

To accelerate certification flight testing of the SJ-100, UEC supplied additional PD-8 engines on 25 March 2025 to equip a second prototype. On 10 July 2025, the second SJ-100 prototype with PD-8 engines (msn 97012) ferried from Komsomolsk-on-Amur to Zhukovsky to continue the certification flight program. On 5 September 2025, the first production SJ-100 (msn 97024), equipped with two PD-8 engines, made its first flight. In late January 2026, the SJ-100 (msn 97024) with PD-8 engines made its international debut at Wings India in Hyderabad, India.

In January 2026, the engine passed bird ingestion certification tests, having earlier passed fan blade-off and water ingestion tests. In February, as part of certification testing, the engine completed endurance testing at maximum thrust, and in March, installed on the SJ-100, it passed natural icing tests during flights in Arkhangelsk Oblast. In April, the engine underwent hail ingestion bench tests. In May 2026, the engine completed all certification tests (full-scale testing involved 78 engine builds, double the number typical in global practice), and the Ministry of Transport reported that it had submitted documentation for the engine to Rosaviatsia for type certification.

The PD-8 was issued its type certificate on 5 June 2026. The certificate was presented by Rosaviatsia head Dmitry Yadrov to UEC CEO Alexander Grachev at the St. Petersburg International Economic Forum (SPIEF-2026).

== Production ==
The PD-8 entered production in late June 2026, when UEC-Saturn started assembling the first production engines. In August 2026, Ilya Konyukhov, CEO of UEC-Saturn, reported that the first two production PD-8 engines had been delivered to the Yakovlev manufacturing facility in Komsomolsk-on-Amur.

== Design ==
The PD-8 is a two-spool, direct-drive turbofan in the 78 kN (eight-tonne) thrust class. Its configuration is 1 fan, 3 LP compressor stages, 7 HP compressor stages, 1 HP turbine stage, and 3 LP turbine stages. The engine's technical base derives from the PD-14, with new Russian alloys and an entirely domestic electronic control system. The compressor pressure ratio is 28 and the bypass ratio is 4.4.

Contrary to a common misconception, the PD-8 is not a reworked version of the Franco-Russian SaM146, despite belonging to the same thrust class. The two powerplants have fundamentally different designs, and the technical solutions of the SaM146 could not have served as the basis for the PD-8, as the original baseline was entirely different.

=== Control system ===
The engine is controlled by the SAU-8, a FADEC (Full Authority Digital Engine Control) system developed and manufactured by Perm-based UEC-STAR. The system replaces the mechanical and hydraulic linkages between the cockpit and the powerplant with a fully digital architecture. It manages all engine modes — takeoff, cruise, and landing — and provides protection against low-pressure turbine rotor overspeed and compressor surge. The SAU-8 includes the RED-8 electronic regulator and the BZD-8 engine protection unit, both of which entered production in 2026 after receiving airworthiness approvals from Rosaviatsia.

=== Thrust reverser ===
Unlike the SaM146, which uses a clamshell (bucket-type) thrust reverser, the PD-8 employs a cascade (grid-type) reverser with an electrically actuated sliding sleeve. In the PD-8 design, the outer cowl translates rearward, exposing a composite aerodynamic cascade that redirects the cold-stream airflow forward while blocking the direct exhaust path. This arrangement provides faster and quieter deployment than the SaM146's clamshell design, improving braking efficiency during the landing roll. The cascade cells distribute and redirect the airflow more evenly, reducing turbulence and noise. The PD-8's thrust reverser was first evaluated on an SJ-100 aircraft in Zhukovsky in October 2025, with tests conducted under various wing configurations.

=== Materials and manufacturing ===
High-pressure turbine blades and nozzle guide vanes are manufactured from five new cast heat-resistant nickel alloys developed in cooperation with the All-Russian Institute Of Aviation Materials (VIAM). These alloys were specifically designed for various PD-8 components and offer greater resistance to high temperatures than those used on the larger PD-14. Fan blades and low-pressure compressor blades are made of titanium alloy. The use of wide-chord, hollow titanium fan blades allows for a smaller number of blades while providing greater fan and low-pressure compressor efficiency. A new Russian polymer, VKU-65, a carbon-fiber reinforced plastic made from polyetheretherketone and carbon fiber, is used for the engine's compressor panels.

The PD-8 also incorporates components produced by additive manufacturing (3D printing). More than 200 parts were designed for additive production during the development phase, and more than ten types entered production stage. The engine's oil sump housing was redesigned for 3D printing, consolidating several individual parts into a single monolithic structure; this reduced the component's weight by 40% and the volume of machining by 80%. The reduced number of parts and joints also lowers the probability of failure. The additive components are made from titanium alloys, stainless steel, and heat-resistant cobalt- and nickel-based alloys developed at UEC-Saturn.

=== Nacelle ===
The PD-8's nacelle is approximately 60% composite by weight and was developed using experience gained from the PD-14. The first flight-set nacelle was delivered by the Voronezh Aircraft Plant (VASO) in October 2022; the set comprises the cowling, the casing, and the thrust-reverser doors, with domestic composites used throughout.

== Applications ==
- Beriev Be-200
- Ilyushin Il-212
- Yakovlev SJ-100

== Specifications ==
Data from

==== General characteristics ====
- Type: Two-spool, direct-drive turbofan
- Length: 3,589 mm (141.3 in) (with mixer)
- Diameter: 1,228 mm (48.3 in) (fan)
- Dry weight: 1,700 kg (3,747 lb) (dry)

==== Components ====
- Compressor: 1 fan, 3 LP compressor stages, 7 HP compressor stages
- Combustors: Annular
- Turbine: 1 HP turbine stage, 3 LP turbine stages

==== Performance ====
- Maximum thrust: 78.0 kN (8,056 kgf) (takeoff)
- Overall pressure ratio: 28
- Bypass ratio: 4.4
- Specific fuel consumption: 0.61 kg/(kgf·h) (cruise)

Additional characteristics

- Weight with nacelle: 2,300 kg (5,071 lb)
- Normal takeoff thrust: 73.3 kN (7,477 kgf)
- Cruise thrust: approximately 73.6 kN (7,500 kgf)
- Service life: on-condition

== See also ==
Related development

- Aviadvigatel PD-14
- PowerJet SaM146

Comparable engines

- General Electric CF34
- Pratt & Whitney PW6000
- Progress D-436
- Rolls-Royce BR700

Related lists

- List of aircraft engines
