= Yakovlev SJ-100 =

Russian twin-engine regional jet

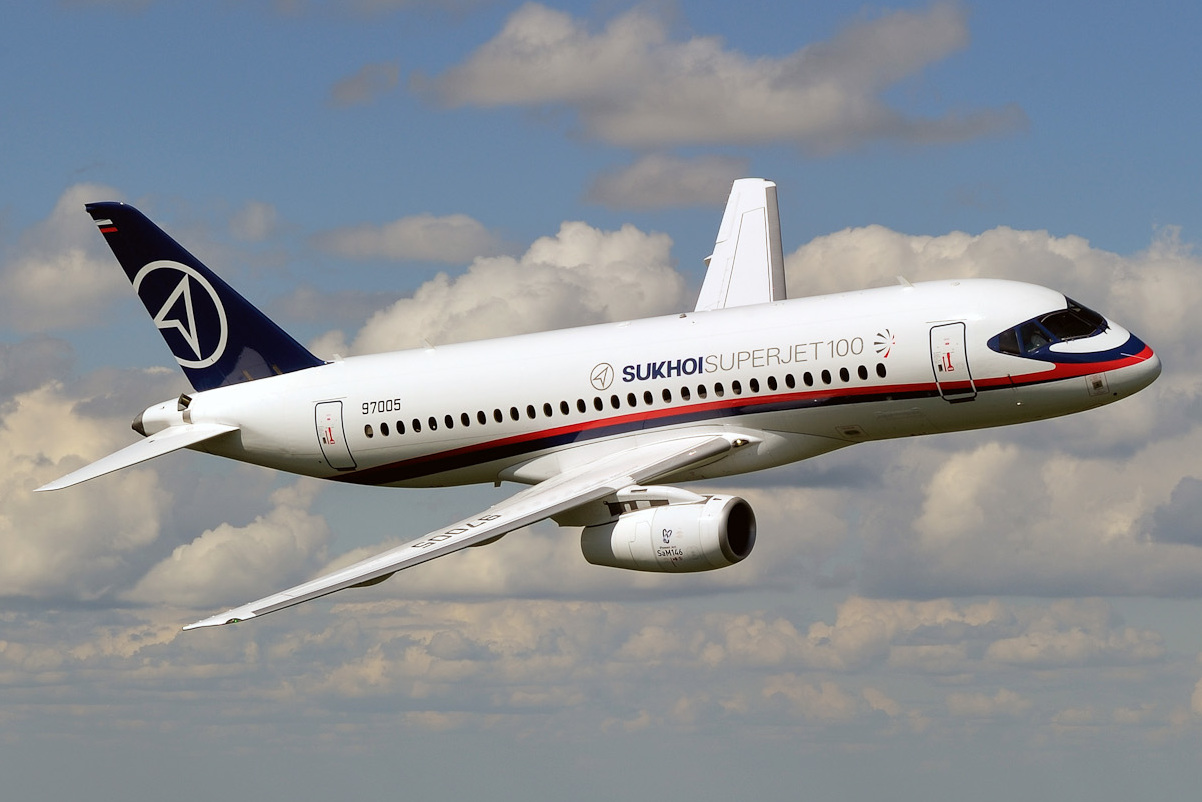
- A Superjet 100 during its test flight.

General information
- Other name: Superjet 100
- Type: Regional jet
- National origin: Russia
- Manufacturer: United Aircraft Corporation; Hindustan Aeronautics Limited
- Designer: Sukhoi
- Built by: Komsomolsk-on-Amur Aircraft Plant
- Status: In service
- Primary users: Aeroflot Yamal Airlines; Red Wings Airlines; Azimuth; Gazpromavia
- Number built: 236 by January 2026

History
- Manufactured: 2007–present
- Introduction date: 21 April 2011 with Armavia
- First flight: 19 May 2008

The Yakovlev SJ-100 (until August 2023: Sukhoi Superjet 100 [SSJ100], Russian: Сухой Суперджет 100, romanized: Sukhoy Superdzhet 100) is a regional jet originally designed by the now-merged Russian aircraft company Sukhoi Civil Aircraft, a division of the United Aircraft Corporation (now: "Regional Aircraft" company branch). With development starting in 2000, it made its maiden flight on 19 May 2008 and its first commercial flight on 21 April 2011 with Armavia.

The 46–49 t (45–48 long tons) MTOW plane typically seats 87 to 98 passengers. Aircraft built before 2025 are powered by two 77–79 kN (17,000–18,000 lb_{f}) PowerJet SaM146 turbofans developed by a joint venture between French Safran and Russian NPO Saturn. By May 2018, 127 aircraft were in service, and by September the fleet had logged 300,000 revenue flights and 460,000 hours. By November 2021 the fleet had logged at least 2 million hours. The type has recorded five hull loss accidents and 89 deaths as of January 2026.

In 2022, Sukhoi announced a Russified version of the body and electronics, without most of the Western components. The engines were also replaced by the Russian NPO Saturn PD-8 model. Aeroflot ordered 89 Russified aircraft in 2022. In August 2023, parent company Irkut rebranded itself as Yakovlev, with the Superjet now known as the SJ-100. Deliveries of the fully Russian SJ-100 are expected to begin in 2027.

== Development ==
=== Part-Russian jet with Snecma-Saturn engine ===
==== Background ====
JSC Sukhoi was incorporated in May 2000 to develop the first all-new commercial aircraft in post-Soviet Russia. Studies of the Russian Regional Jet (RRJ) began in 2001. After analysing the Russian market, Sukhoi identified a need for an aircraft with a range of between 3,000 and 4,500 km (1,900 and 2,800 mi), greater than typical regional jets. Three variants were initially envisaged: the RRJ60, RRJ75 and RRJ95, with 60, 78 and 98 seats respectively; a five-abreast layout was chosen as being optimal for this size range. Sukhoi estimated the targeted market to be around 800 aircraft, including 250–300 from Russia and the Commonwealth of Independent States.

On 15 October 2001, the Russian government allocated $46.6 million to the development of a new 70–80 seat regional jet, targeting first flight in 2006 and entry into service in 2007. Sukhoi's RRJ was competing against Myasishchev's M-60-70 and Tupolev's Tu-414 projects. Boeing provided advice to Sukhoi and its partners on programme management, engineering, marketing, product development, certification, supplier management and customer support. The Sukhoi RRJ was selected by Rosaviakosmos, the government's aviation and space agency, in March 2003.

The RRJ programme allocated $63.5 million to the development of a 4–5 tf (8,800–11,000 lbf) engine between 2003 and 2015. Four engines were initially envisaged: the Pratt & Whitney PW800, the Rolls-Royce BR710, the General Electric CF34-8, and the Snecma/NPO Saturn SaM146. The BR710 and the CF34-8 were eliminated by July 2002, and the PW800 was subsequently rejected due to a perceived technical risk associated with its geared fan. A formal memorandum of understanding was signed with Snecma on 29 April 2003, confirming the selection of the 14,000–17,000 lbf (62–76 kN) SaM146, to be developed in a joint venture with NPO Saturn, based on the Snecma SPW14 and combining a Snecma DEM21 gas generator with an NPO Saturn "cold section".

Key suppliers were selected in October 2003, including Thales for avionics, Messier-Bugatti-Dowty for landing gear, Honeywell for the auxiliary power unit, Liebherr for flight controls, Intertechnique for fuel systems, Parker Hannifin for hydraulic systems, B/E Aerospace for interiors. At this time, Sukhoi anticipated a market for 600 aircraft by 2020 – representing 10% of global demand for regional jets – for a total sales volume of $11 billion. Discussions were held with Air France and the SkyTeam alliance to ensure that the aircraft would meet western requirements. An application for EASA certification was made in 2004 and was expected to be granted six months after the Russian approval.

The Komsomolsk-on-Amur plant was selected in February 2005 for final assembly, implementing jig-less assembly, automatic component alignment and automatic riveting. The RRJ60 and RRJ75 were deemed to be less cost-effective, and development was focused on the largest model, the 98-seat RRJ95. The 78-seater RRJ75 remained under consideration, and a future stretch was also envisaged. The RRJ95 was renamed the Sukhoi Superjet 100 at the Farnborough Air Show in July 2005. The first order, for 30 aircraft, was signed on 7 December with Aeroflot.

In June 2007, Boeing expanded its assistance to cover flight and maintenance crew training and manuals, and spare parts management and supply. On 22 August, Sukhoi and Alenia Aeronautica established the SuperJet International joint venture for customer support outside Russia and Asia. Alenia Aeronautica took a 25% stake in Sukhoi Civil Aircraft Corporation (SCAC) for $250 million, valuing it at $1 billion. Development costs were expected to total $1 billion, with another $1 billion needed to develop the powerplant and for customer support.

==== Flight testing with original components ====
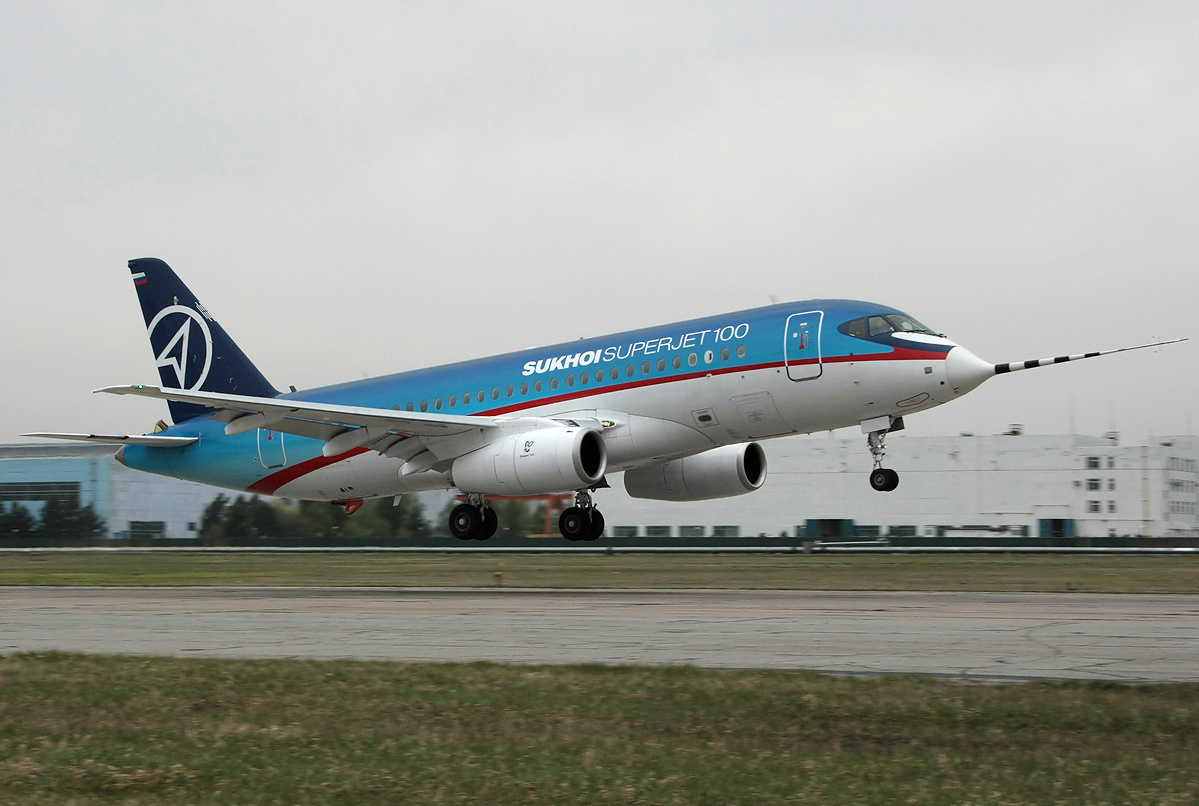
Maiden flight on 19 May 2008

The first SSJ was transported in an Antonov 124 from Komsomolsk-on-Amur to Zhukovsky, Moscow Oblast on 28 January 2007, for ground tests conducted by the Central Aerohydrodynamic Institute (TsAGI). The SuperJet was officially unveiled on 26 September 2007 at Dzyomgi Airport in Komsomolsk-on-Amur. By October 2007, initial deliveries were scheduled for 2009; plans called for the 95–98-seat model to be followed by a 75–78-seat shrink and a 110-seat stretch.

The SaM146 engine was first run on 21 February 2008. Tests were conducted by the Gromov Flight Research Institute, using an Ilyushin Il-76LL as a flying test bed. The SuperJet 100 made its maiden flight on 19 May 2008, taking off from Komsomolsk-on-Amur. By July, certification was expected for the third quarter of 2009, pushing back deliveries to later the same quarter. On 24 December 2008, the second SSJ made its maiden flight.

By January 2009, the first two aircraft had completed over 80 flights, and the engines had accumulated 2,300 hours of tests. In April 2009, the two prototypes were flown 3,000 km (1,600 nmi) from Novosibirsk to Moscow, and EASA pilots conducted a number of familiarisation flights. A third prototype joined the test campaign in July 2009.

The SSJ made its international debut at the 2009 Paris Air Show; during the show, Malév Hungarian Airlines placed a $1 billion order for 30 aircraft. As of June 2009, 13 aircraft were under construction, with the first four scheduled to be handed over to clients from December. Armenian Armavia was to receive the first two, followed by Aeroflot, having ordered 30 with an option for 15 more. Other customers include Russian Avialeasing, Swiss AMA Asset Management Advisor, and Indonesian Kartika Airlines. Sukhoi expected production to reach a rate of 70 aircraft per year by 2012.

In December 2009, engine availability issues resulted in deliveries being delayed indefinitely. On 4 February 2010, the fourth prototype made its maiden flight using engines removed from the first prototype, as a result of continuing delays in engine production, including NPO Saturn quality problems. On 15 September 2010, static tests for certification of the aircraft were completed by TsAGI.

==== First certification ====
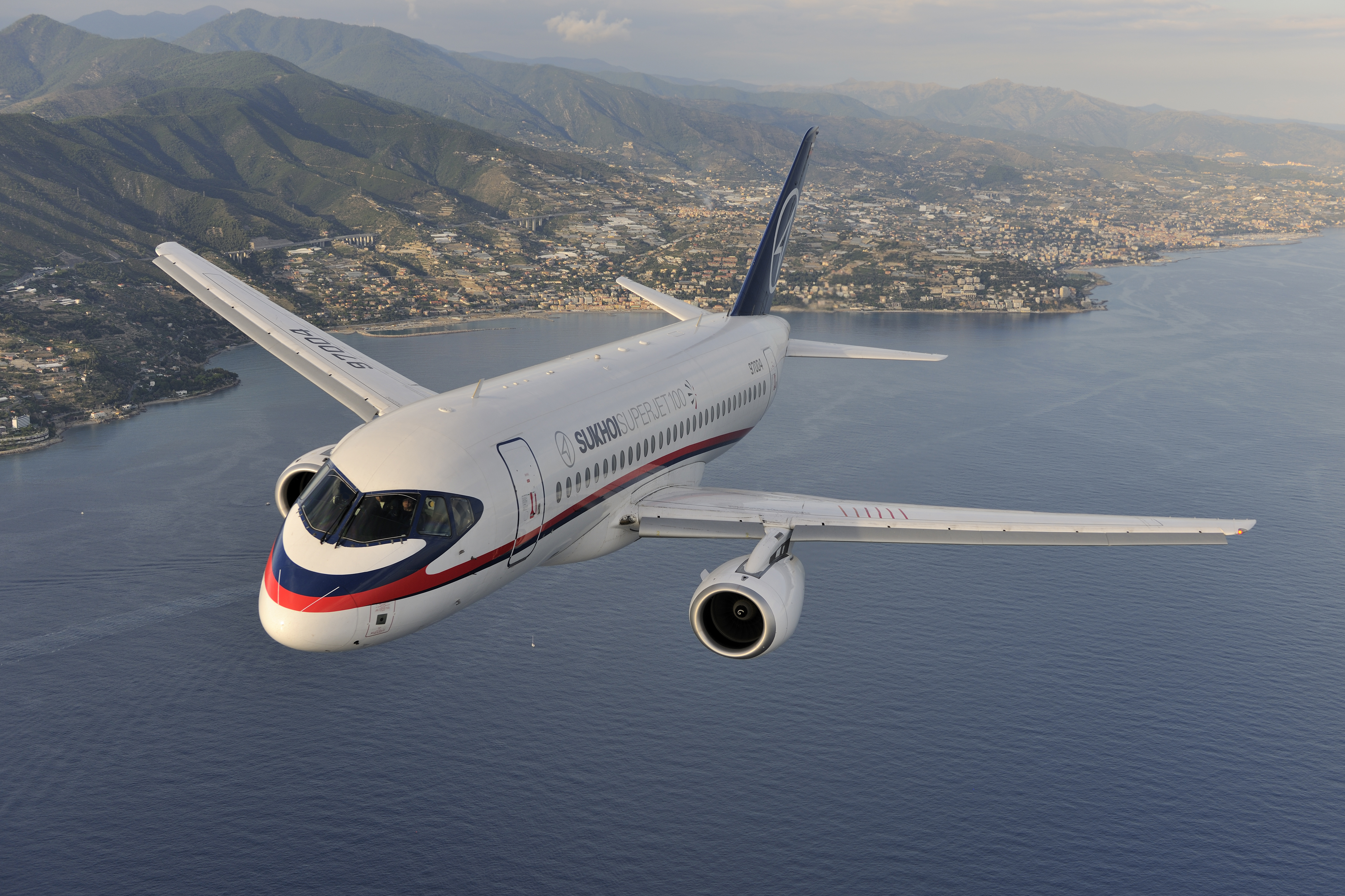
Test flight over Sanremo, Italy

By June 2010, certification was 90% complete but was delayed due to SaM146 engine problems that were not encountered during testing. In September 2010, certification was expected for November. In October 2010, noise was tested for certification authorities, Russian IAC and European EASA. On 4 November 2010, the first production aircraft, intended for Armavia, was first flown. By November 2010, the SSJ test fleet had made 948 flights totalling 2,245 hours.

On 3 February 2011, IAC granted a Type Certificate. EASA's Type Certificate followed on 3 February 2012, allowing operations in European countries.

On 14 March 2022, EASA revoked the Superjet's airworthiness certificate as part of the EU's sanctions against Russia following the Russian invasion of Ukraine.

==== In-service developments ====
In summer 2017, the business jet variant's additional fuel tanks were certified to carry 3,100 kg (6,800 lb) more fuel, increasing range from 4,420 km (2,390 nmi) to 6,000 km (3,200 nmi).

London City Airport is a major destination for Irish airline CityJet, which was to receive 15 SSJ100s, but its steep 5.5° approach required new control laws, wing flap setting and modified brakes: test flights were to begin in December 2017, with certification planned for 2018, and the modified aircraft to be available in 2019. In any event, CityJet ceased all use of SSJ-100 aircraft by November 2020.

A new "sabrelet" winglet, helping takeoff and landing performance and delivering 3% better fuel burn, will be standard and available for retrofit. Designed with CFD tools by Sukhoi and TsAGI, the "saberlets" debuted flight tests on 21 December 2017. They should improve hot and high airport performance and cut costs up to $70,000 per year. Parts of the wing are reinforced for the aerodynamic loads distribution change. They should reduce fuel costs by 4%. Flight-testing was completed after over 140 flights by October 2019. The first aircraft with the composite winglets was delivered to Russian carrier Severstal Aircompany in December 2019.

By November 2018, the TsAGI carried out wind tunnel tests on two modified wing designs to save structural weight: one with less wing sweep and the other with more relative thickness, also enhancing aerodynamics and load capabilities, and improving fuel efficiency by nearly 10%.

=== Fully Russian jet with Aviadvigatel engine ===
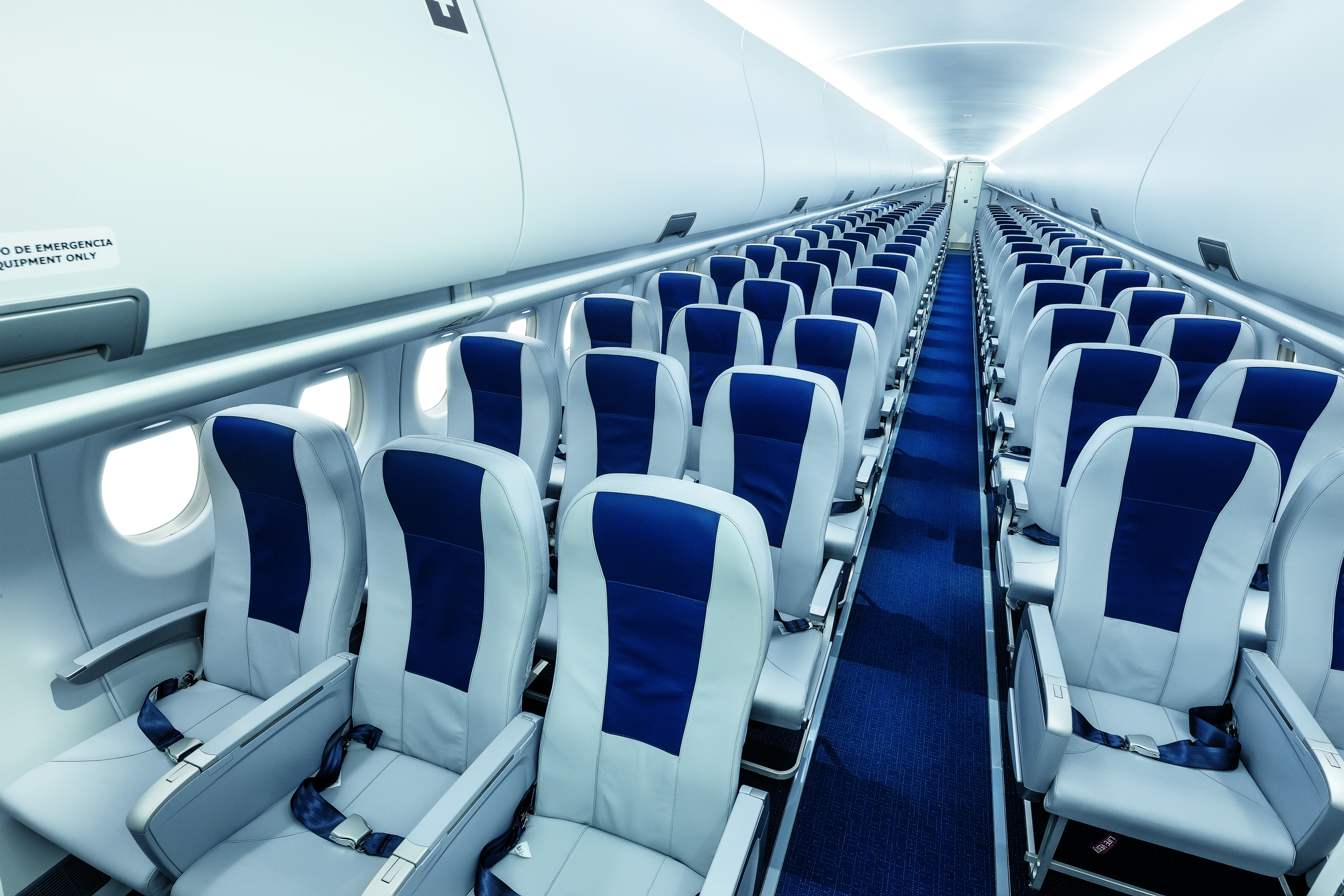
Standard cabin seating

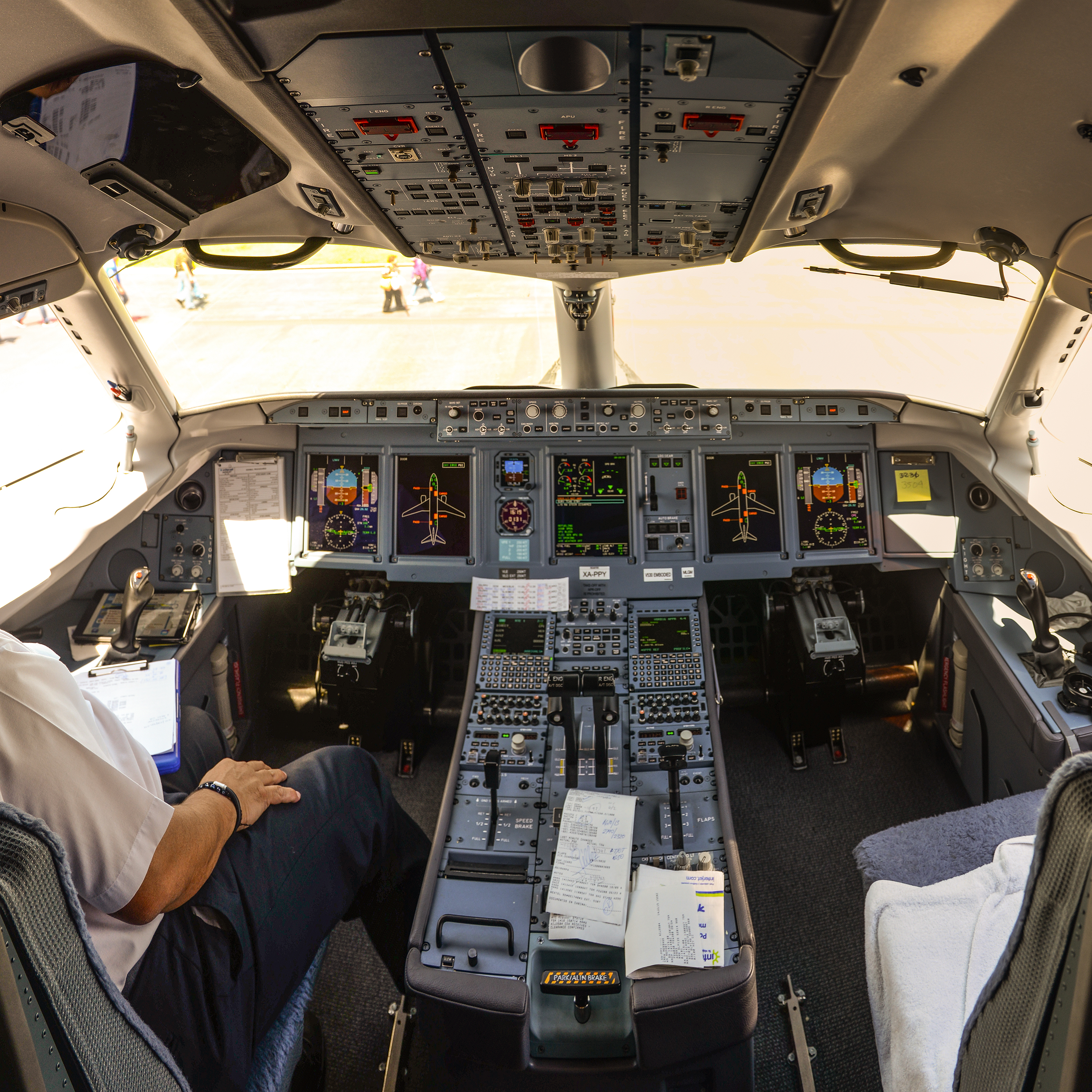
Cockpit

==== Background ====
To resist the Airbus–Boeing duopoly pressure on regional jets through the Embraer E-Jet E2 (once set to become a Boeing product, after its later failed acquisition of Embraer) and the Airbus A220, Sukhoi intended to upgrade the SSJ100 to the SSJ100B and the "Russianised" SSJ100R. Western content accounted for 55–60% of the original SSJ100's cost but sanctions against Russia were tightening by 2018. As of December 2018, the US authorities did not send any feedback to Sukhoi over exports to Iran.

The SSJ100B would have featured more powerful SaM146-1S18 engines, improved avionics software, enhanced high-lift devices controls and retrofittable "sabrelet" blended wingtip devices. For government customers and countries subject to international sanctions, such as Iran Air Tours and Iran Aseman, the SSJ100R would then, from 2021, have replaced western components with Russian ones.

The Russified SSJ100R was planned to use a smaller derivative of the Aviadvigatel PD-14 engine, the PD-8; KRET electronic units were to replace the Thales avionics; a Russian inertial navigation system and APU were to replace Honeywell's devices; and new landing gear was to replace the one produced by Safran. Fuel burn was planned to be reduced by 5–8% with a new composite wing. Russian content was set to double to 30%, as US restrictions limited its export potential.

Sukhoi forecast 345 sales from 2018 to 2030, mostly in post-Soviet states and some in south-east Asia and Latin America, including an improved-range business jet version. The seating capacity was to be raised to 110, and high and hot operations to 4000 m and 50 °C. A freighter variant was also studied. The Russian government had earmarked ₽3.2 billion ($51 million) toward the variant of the SSJ with indigenous propulsion and avionics, which was introduced at the Eurasia Airshow 2018 in Antalya alongside the SSJ75.

==== Sukhoi and Irkut integrated in Yakovlev ====
At the end of November 2018, United Aircraft Corporation transferred SCAC from Sukhoi to the Irkut Corporation, to become UAC's airliner division, as Leonardo S.p.A. had pulled out in early 2017 because of Superjet's poor financial performance. Irkut managed the Superjet 100, the MC-21 and the Russo-Chinese CR929 widebody, but the Il-114 passenger turboprop and modernized Ilyushin Il-96-400 widebody stayed with Ilyushin. The new commercial division also included the Yakovlev Design Bureau, avionics specialist UAC–Integration Center and composite manufacturer AeroComposit. The aircraft was to be known simply as the Superjet 100, dropping the Sukhoi name.

In July 2023, Irkut announced that the entire company would be rebranded under the Yakovlev name, to be effective by the end of August, though it did not specify whether the Superjet would undergo a further change of designation. The name change was confirmed in August 2023 by the new Yakovlev division, however: the Superjet dropped the Sukhoi name and became known as the SJ-100.

==== Tests of new Russian components and structural testing ====
In May 2021, Rostec announced the completion of the first experimental core 'hot section' of the PD-8 engine. The 'Russified' variant of the SSJ with the composite wing, indigenous avionics and the PD-8 engine later became known as the SSJ-New. In July 2021, UEC exhibited the new engine at the 2021 Moscow Air Show and aimed to secure type certification by 2023. In January 2022, a new control system, developed by UEC for the PD-8 engine, was being tested prior to integration with the engine.

Under a plan announced in June 2022 to bring the proportion of domestically produced aircraft to 80% of the Russian fleet by the end of the decade following the international sanctions brought in after the 2022 Russian invasion of Ukraine, serial production of the SSJ-New was targeted for 2023. In July 2022, a prototype SSJ-New fuselage was transported to test facilities near Moscow to undergo life cycle testing. Further prototypes were assembled in 2023, with structural testing of the updated airframe and certification of the PD-8 engine both expected to be completed by the autumn. In May 2023 serial production was expected to begin in 2024.

==== Envisaged, but not implemented divestment of SuperJet ====
In March 2023, a deal was announced that would have seen UAC completely exit the Superjet 100 programme by selling its entire stake in SuperJet International (SJI) to an Emirati investment fund, Markab Capital Investments. A new factory would have been built at Al Ain International Airport, Abu Dhabi, where aircraft would be assembled before completion at SJI's Venice site.

The deal was conditional on SJI's assets being unfrozen by the European Union. A new supply chain to be established in Italy by Leonardo to service the Abu Dhabi production line, and the transfer of respective intellectual property were part of the deal. It was not clarified how production of the Russified SSJ-New, intended to service Russia's domestic market, would have been affected by the deal.

==== Flight testing with new Russian components ====
Yakovlev carried out the first flight of its new version of the Superjet 100 featuring all-Russian components – now known as the SJ-100 – in August 2023, albeit initially with SaM146 engines rather than the intended NPO Saturn PD-8 engines. In mid-2024, the engine manufacturer was implementing a strategy of using a computer model of the PD-8 for testing in order to reduce the number of required real engine tests, so as to accelerate PD-8 certification.

Deliveries of the first PD-8 engines for flight testing on SJ-100 aircraft were reported on 11 February 2025. The first flight of a SJ-100 with the PD-8 series of engines fitted occurred on 17 March 2025 within a testing programme with two aircraft (one of which had the PD-8 engines fitted). This was followed by a PD-8-powered flight on 23 April 2025 with a third aircraft (prototype serial number 97023) that, for the first time, featured an almost complete replacement of imported components. On 5 September 2025, the first serial-produced import-substituted aircraft (serial number 97024) completed its maiden flight; at that date 24 SJ-100s were reported to be at various stages of completion.

==== Second certification ====
According to Aviationfile, in April 2025 UAC planned to complete certification tests for the SJ-100 by the end of 2025. Deliveries of airplanes were to begin in 2026. However, it was reported in December 2025 that the PD-8 engine had a problem with maximum thrust power, which would be insufficient for an SJ-100 with a full passenger load. On 5 June 2026, type certification for the PD-8 was finally granted by the Russian Federal Air Transport Agency. On 20 March 2026 the Russian Federal Air Transport Agency (Rosaviatsiya) expected to certify the fully import-substituted SJ-100 in July 2026.

==== Production start and deliveries ====
According to news website RuAviation, deliveries were planned to begin with approximately 12 aircraft in the second half of 2026. However, on 18 September 2026, Rostec CEO Sergei Chemezov said that deliveries of the SJ-100 would start only in the second half of 2027.

== Design ==
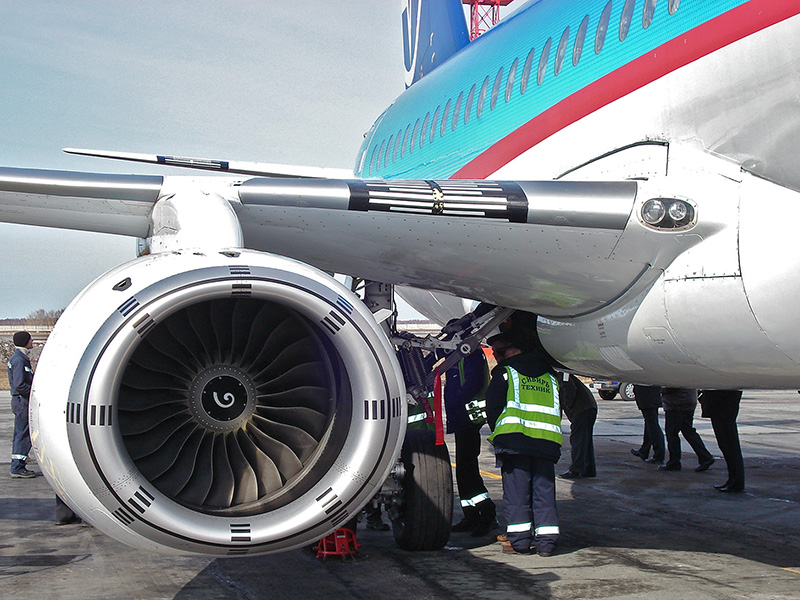
A SaM146 turbofan

=== Concept ===
The five-abreast cross-section is more optimised beyond 70 seats than the four-abreast Bombardier CRJs and Embraer E-Jets but smaller than the six-abreast Airbus A320 and Boeing 737. The SSJ100 typically seats 87 to 98 passengers. In Russia, it replaces the aging Tupolev Tu-134 and Yakovlev Yak-42 aircraft. It competes with the Antonov An-148, Embraer E190 and the Bombardier CRJ1000. In 2012, Sukhoi claimed that cash operational costs were lower than competitors' costs by 8-10%, with reduced fuel burn per seat and longer maintenance intervals. The design meets CIS AP-25, US FAR-25 and EU JAR-25 aviation rules, and conforms to ICAO Chapter 4 and FAR 36 Section 4 noise standards from 2006.

=== Development cost and state aid ===
The Russian Ministry of Industry and Trade supported the project as a priority project. In 2010, development costs were $1.4 billion excluding the SaM146 engine, with 25% funded from the federal budget, rising to US$ 1.5 billion by 2013. Unit cost was US$31–35 million in 2012, rising to a roughly US$50 million base price in 2018.

=== Engines ===
==== PowerJet SaM146 ====
Initially, over 30 foreign partnerships were involved in the design and production of the aircraft. The SaM146 engines were developed, manufactured and marketed by PowerJet, a joint-venture between French Safran Aircraft Engines (formerly Snecma) and Russia's NPO Saturn. The PowerJet SaM146 turbofans provide 60 to 78 kilonewtons (13,500–17,500 lbf) of thrust for a 70–120 seat aircraft.

Due to sanctions imposed following the Russian invasion of Ukraine in 2022, the Powerjet engine was no longer a viable alternative. There was even a shortage of parts for the existing SaM146 engines from 2023, for example igniter plugs produced in the United States, and French fuel filters, for which no domestic replacement could be found. As of April 2025, the official website of manufacturer Yakovlev Corporation no longer listed the PowerJet SaM146 as an engine option, instead only specifying "2 х PD-8" (see below) as the propulsion of the SJ-100.

==== NPO Saturn PD-8 ====
In May 2021, Rostec announced the completion of the first experimental core 'hot section' of the PD-8 engine. Under a plan announced in June 2022 following international sanctions after the 2022 Russian invasion of Ukraine, prototypes of an all-Russian SJ-100 were assembled in 2023, with structural testing of the updated airframe and certification of the NPO Saturn PD-8 engine both expected to be completed by autumn 2023. Serial production was then expected to begin in 2024.

Yakovlev carried out the first flight of its new version of the Superjet 100 featuring all-Russian components – now known as the SJ-100 – in August 2023, albeit still with SaM146 engines rather than the intended PD-8s. As of mid-2024, the engine manufacturer was implementing a strategy of using a computer model of the PD-8 for testing in order to reduce the number of required real engine tests, so as to accelerate PD-8 certification.

In February 2025, Vladimir Artjakov of Rostec stated that first PD-8 engines had now been delivered to the production site of the SJ-100 in Komsomolsk and that flight testing of the new engine was to begin as soon as possible. The maiden flight of the PD-8 was finally completed on 17 March 2025. Delivery of the newly-designed SJ-100, with mostly Russian parts, was at that stage planned for 2026. However, aviation experts already believed that the commercial schedule was too optimistic, based on the remaining certification tests. On 8 April 2025, an SJ-100 fitted with a PD-8 carried out a flight at cruise altitude as part of a test programme for the new PD-8 engine.

In July, 2025, the official word was that engine certification was expected by the end of the year. Four production engines were also anticipated to be completed by the end of 2025, with deliveries for the SJ-100 program at the time planned to start by the spring of 2026 and engine production eventually ramping up to 30 per year. On September 5, 2025, the first production SJ-100 plane, powered by a pair of PD-8 engines, took to the skies.

On 5 June 2026, type certification for the PD-8 was granted by the Russian Federal Air Transport Agency at the same time as the 2026 St. Petersburg Economic Forum was held. The engine was then scheduled to enter commercial service with the SJ-100 in 2027.

== Production and marketing ==
=== Assembly ===
Assembly is performed at the Komsomolsk-on-Amur Aircraft Plant in the Russian Far East, while the Novosibirsk Aircraft Production Association produces components; both were upgrading their facilities in 2011 and were expecting to produce 70 airframes in 2012.

=== Marketing of part-Russian jet ===
A joint venture between Alenia (later part of Leonardo S.p.A.) and Sukhoi, SuperJet International, was initially responsible for marketing in Europe, the Americas, Africa, Japan and Oceania, though Leonardo pulled out in early 2017 because of Superjet's poor financial performance and Sukhoi regained a 100% share in SCAC.

==== Slow sales ====
Sukhoi delivered only three SSJs in the first half of 2019; its financial results show a sevenfold drop in aircraft sales revenue and a fourfold drop in overall sales revenue, resulting in a 32% increase in its net loss. The company needs to achieve a production rate of 32 to 34 aircraft per year to make a profit, though demand for Russian models in the 60–120 seat category is forecast to be only 10 aircraft per year over a 20-year period. In the short-term, the company's main hope is that Aeroflot will firm up its 2018 preliminary agreement for 100 SSJs.

Yamal Airlines, the second-largest Russian SSJ operator, announced the cancellation of its order for 10 further SSJs, citing high servicing costs. Of 30–40 SSJs owned by Aeroflot, only 10 are reportedly usable at a time due to maintenance problems. Aeroflot cancelled approximately 50 Superjet flights in the week following the Flight 1492 accident. Kommersant cited industry sources as saying the Superjet 100 had lower dispatch reliability than Airbus and Boeing aircraft in the airline's fleet historically and attributed a rise in cancellations to "increased safety measures" at Aeroflot while the accident is investigated. On 4 June, the Russian Federal Air Transport Agency (Rosaviatsiya) ordered carriers to perform one-time inspections of the SSJ, including a general check of the aircraft's condition and verification of aircraft and engine logs, by 25 June.

A total of 12 jets were delivered in 2020 to the following operators: Rossiya Airlines, Azimuth Airlines, Red Wings Airlines. The sole remaining western operator, Interjet, down by the end of November 2020 to just four operational SSJ100s, quit flying in December 2020 and entered bankruptcy in April 2021. Part of Interjet's plan was to try to return its 22 SSJ-100s to Sukhoi to cancel its debt, and resume flying with 10 Airbus A320 aircraft. In December 2020, Rossiya Airlines announced that it intends to operate 66 Superjets by the end of 2021, transferred from its parent company Aeroflot which currently has 54 SJs.

=== Fully Russian jet after 2022 ===
In September 2023, North Korea's supreme leader Kim Jong Un visited a fighter aircraft production in Russia's Far East, he also inspected civil aviation project, including the domestic made Superjet 100.

=== Licensed manufacturing in India ===
On 28 October 2025, India's Hindustan Aeronautics Limited (HAL) signed a memorandum of understanding with Russia's United Aircraft Corporation (PJSC-UAC) to manufacture the SJ-100 under license for Indian domestic customers for approving the production of the Indian made SJ-100 civil commuter aircraft parts. This collaboration is also expected to domestically make jets, marking India's return to complete passenger aircraft manufacturing. The partnership marks the first time a complete passenger aircraft will be produced in India since 1988 after the end of production of the Avro HS748. Although no specific date was given for the start of production, HAL estimates a domestic market for over 200 such regional jets over the next decade after its introduction.

On 28 January 2026, an agreement was signed between UAC and HAL regarding cooperation on the production of the SJ-100 in India. The agreement stipulates that HAL would assist in the SJ-100 being granted a type certificate in the country. In return HAL would be granted a license to produce and sell the aircraft, including the production of parts necessary for repair and maintenance. UAC would assist HAL in preparing its production facilities through specialist consultants, design support and technical assistance.

== Operational history ==
=== Part-Russian jet with Snecma-Saturn engine ===
==== Introduction of early users ====
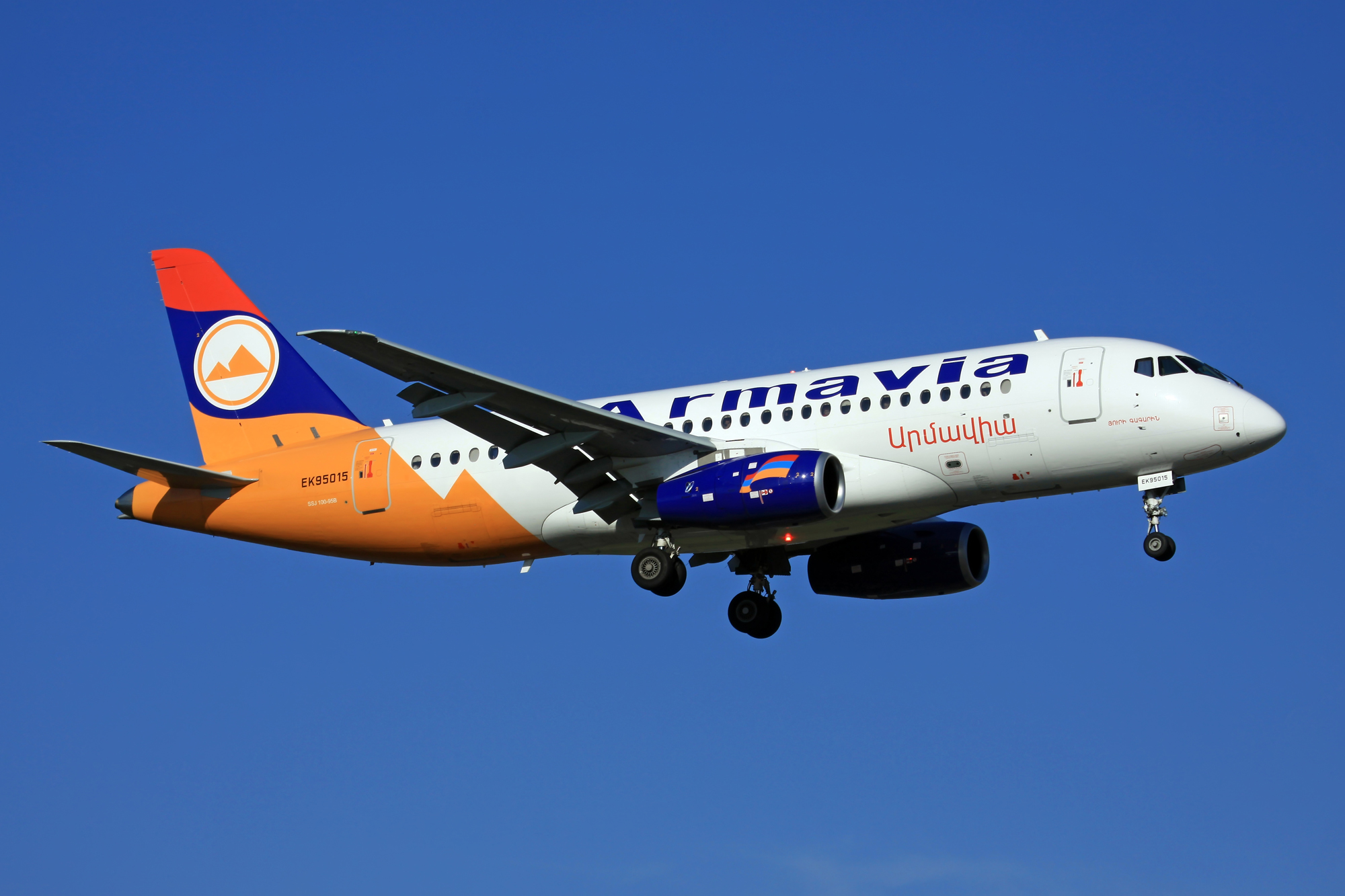
An SSJ100 of Armavia, its first operator

On 19 April 2011, the first production aircraft was handed over to Armavia at Zvartnots Airport in Yerevan, to be operated to Moscow and Sochi, as well as Ukrainian cities. The aircraft was named after Yuri Gagarin. On 21 April, the first commercial flight landed at Moscow Sheremetyevo, lasting 2 h 55 min; Armavia used the Airbus A319 on this route before switching to the Superjet 100. On 1 May, it made its first commercial flight to Venice Airport in around 4 hours, it had accumulated 50 hours in 24 flights by then.

By March 2012, the six aircraft operated by Aeroflot were flying 3.9 hours/day instead of the standard 8–9 hours due to failures and parts delivery delays, and the airline asked for compensation. In August 2012, Armavia announced that it had returned both of its SSJ100s to the manufacturer. Armavia then avoided further deliveries. In February 2013, Sukhoi stated teething problems are usual in new airliners.

The SSJ entered service with Mexican Interjet on 18 September 2013; in their first four weeks, the first two aircraft operated were flown 580 times over 600 hours with a daily utilisation of 9.74 hours and a dispatch reliability of 99.03%. By June 2014, Interjet had received seven SSJ100s and the dispatch reliability had increased to 99.7%. On 12 September 2014, Interjet started regular passenger flights to the US, on the Monterrey, Mexico, – San Antonio, Texas, route. However, Interjet confirmed by January 2020 that it was planning to phase out its SSJ100 fleet, but was unable to do so immediately, having sold all but one of its other planes. By November of that year it kept 3 or 4 of its 22 SSJ100 potentially able to fly, using other planes for parts; and in December the company was closed because was unable to continue operation.

On 3 June 2016, the Irish carrier CityJet was the first western European airline to take delivery of an SSJ100. But CityJet had ceased all use of SSJ-100 aircraft by November 2020.

==== Dependability improvement ====
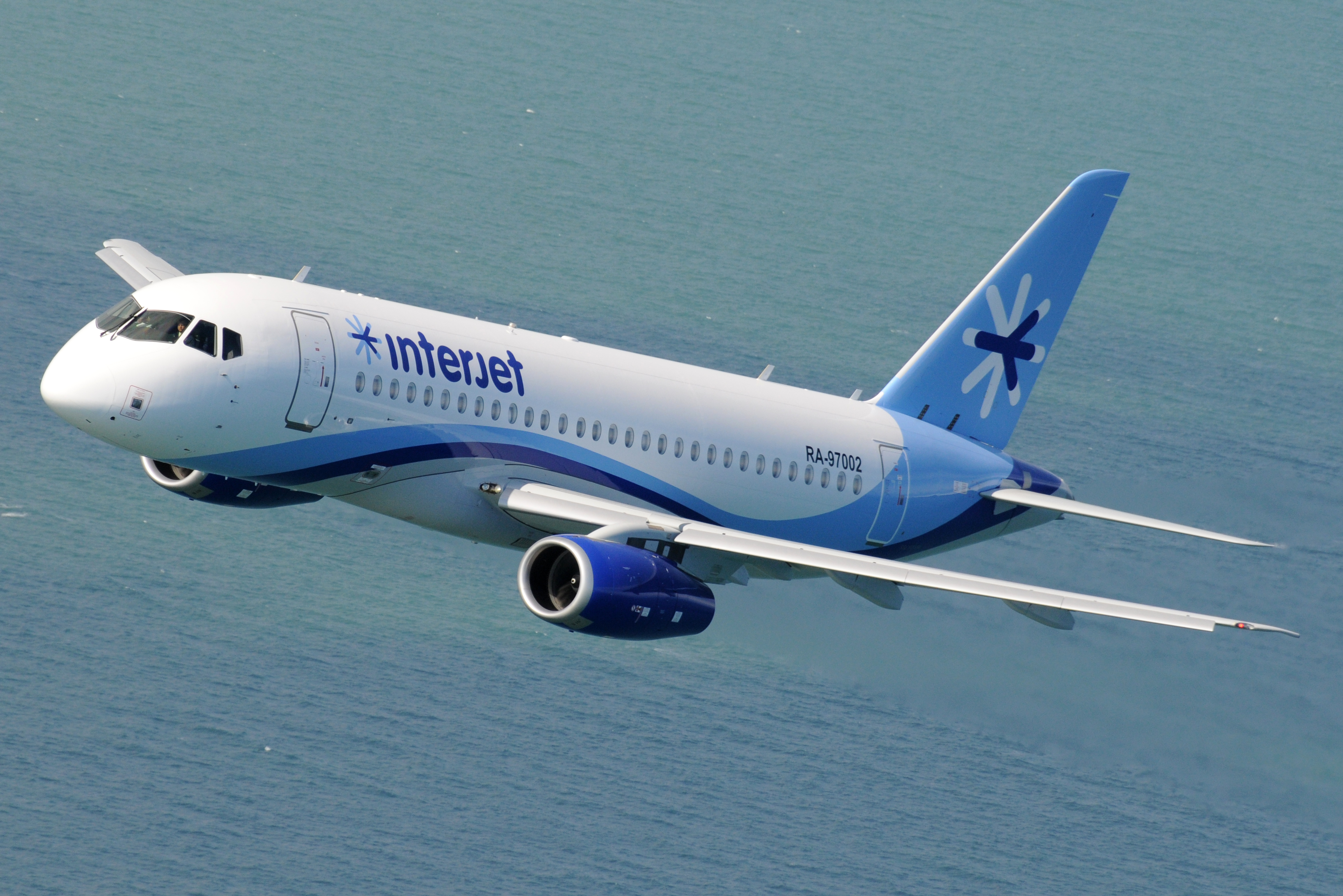
An SSJ100 of Mexico's Interjet, the first North American customer

On 24 December 2016, the Russian Federal Air Transport Agency grounded seven jets after a tail component of an IrAero SSJ100 showed metal fatigue, leading Sukhoi to inspect the entire fleet. By 27 December, all aircraft had been inspected and it had been shown that the defect was not systemic as it featured multiple redundancies and a safety margin doubling the normal loads. Interjet grounded half of its fleet of SSJ100s during this period, but all of its aircraft returned to service by the first week of January 2017 after Sukhoi sent 22 technicians to repair the grounded aircraft.

In June 2017, dispatch reliability increased to 97.85% from 96.94% a year earlier, while there were 89.6 malfunctions per 1,000 flight-hours, down by 40%. On 21 July 2017, following the discovery of horizontal stabiliser rear spar cracks, the EASA mandated compulsory inspections. Sukhoi recognised it needed to improve customer support with more responsiveness and availability for flight training, engineering and spare parts supply. In early November 2017, the Russian Federal Air Transport Agency and Italian Civil Aviation Authority (ENAC) amended their bilateral airworthiness agreement, hitting SSJ export sales. Interjet claimed its capital cost for 10 Superjets was equivalent to the pre-delivery payment for one Airbus A320. The pre-delivery payment amounts to 15-30% of an aircraft list price. An A320 list price was $88.3M in 2012.

In January 2018, Bloomberg reported that four of Interjet's 22 SSJ100s were being cannibalised for parts to keep others running after having been grounded for at least five months because of SaM146 maintenance delays. This was later refuted by Interjet. One grounded SSJ100 was due to be back in service on 19 January 2018 and the remaining three in March. In August 2018, Russian regional carrier Yakutia Airlines considered withdrawing their SSJs, after two were grounded because their engines were removed after 1,500-3,000 cycles, below the 7,000 specified, and no replacements were available. PowerJet was expanding its repair capacity and lease pool as engine maturity improved, noting that the SaM146 engine achieved 99.9% dependability since its 2011 introduction.

==== Productivity in different region ====
In September 2018, Interjet was reported to be considering replacing its SSJ100s with Airbus A320neos, to make better use of its slots, with the SSJ technical problems possibly also a factor. On 12 September, Interjet denied the report. It was later reported that Interjet intends to phase out some of its Superjets and take 20 more A320neos, maybe alongside newer Superjet deliveries; it will have access to an enhanced SSJ spares inventory in Mexico City and is installing a flight simulator in Toluca. The updated SSJs would have winglets, a higher MTOW and improved systems and interior. Sukhoi has also proposed to increase the cabin density from 93 to 108 seats by reducing the pitch from 34 to 30 in (86 to 76 cm). While the airline was attracted by its low introductory price, Sukhoi was forced to reimburse Interjet in 2018 after its fleet of 30 suffered persistent faults.

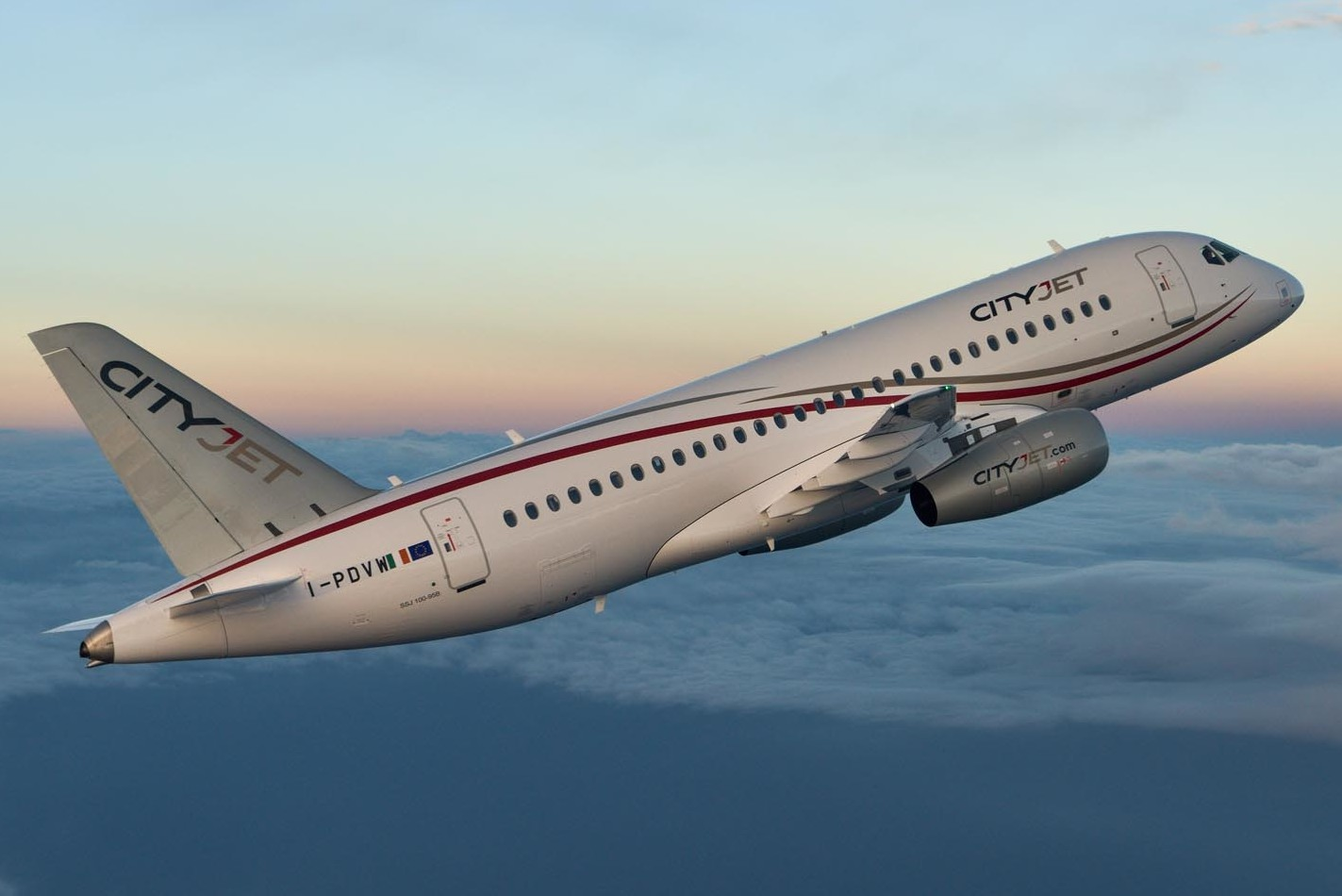
An SSJ100 of CityJet, the first western European operator

In October 2018, Sukhoi and engine contractor UEC agreed on a plan, backed by the Russian government, to focus on customer support rather than deliveries in order to improve dispatch reliability. At the end of November 2018, United Aircraft Corporation transferred SCAC from Sukhoi Holding to the Irkut Corporation, to become UAC's airliner division. By then, Brussels Airlines was seeking alternatives for its four SSJ100s wet-leased from CityJet, as teething problems affected their reliability.

By February 2019, CityJet's remaining five SSJ100s stood idle and were expected to be transferred to Slovenia's Adria Airways, which committed for 15 in late 2018, though Adria subsequently cancelled its order in April 2019. Neither CityJet nor Brussels Airlines have commented as to why they dropped the SSJ, though low reliability, difficult maintenance and spare parts availability are suspected to have contributed.

By the end of the first quarter of 2019, 15 of Interjet's 22 SSJs were out of service. Further talks with Sukhoi were deadlocked, with Interjet reportedly unwilling to pay for repairs to the PowerJet SaM146 engines. Interjet's reliability issues are compounded by the lack of service facilities in the Americas for the SSJ, a factor which also contributed to the poor reliability recorded by CityJet.

On 15 May 2019, Interjet announced that it is to sell its 20 SSJs, of which only five are operational, as it is no longer profitable to operate aircraft of this size in Mexico. Therefore, as of May 2019, Sukhoi has had trouble selling the Superjet and renewing leasing contracts outside of Russia because of reliability and service network issues, resulting in an average of 109 flight hours per month for Russian airlines, approximately half the Embraer EMB 170 productivity, and just a third of a Boeing or Airbus jet. Unease with the SSJ's low reliability also spread to Russian operators.

==== Impact of sanctions against Russia on non-Russian parts ====
Russian operators of the Superjet 100 encountered difficulties in keeping their fleets airborne as result of sanctions imposed following the Russian invasion of Ukraine. In 2023, it emerged that there was a shortage of parts for the SaM146 engines, namely igniter plugs produced in the United States and French fuel filters for which no domestic replacement could be found. Rossiya Airlines expressed fears that only 40% of its Superjet 100 fleet would be active in the spring and summer of 2023 due to lack of parts. In September 2022, UEC Saturn, producer of the SaM146, resorted to cleaning old filters as a method to extend the lifetime of the engines, though this procedure was banned by the Russian regulator due to lack of formal certification.

== Variants ==
Three variants were initially planned, seating 60, 78 and 98 passengers: the RRJ-60, RRJ-75 and RRJ-95, respectively.

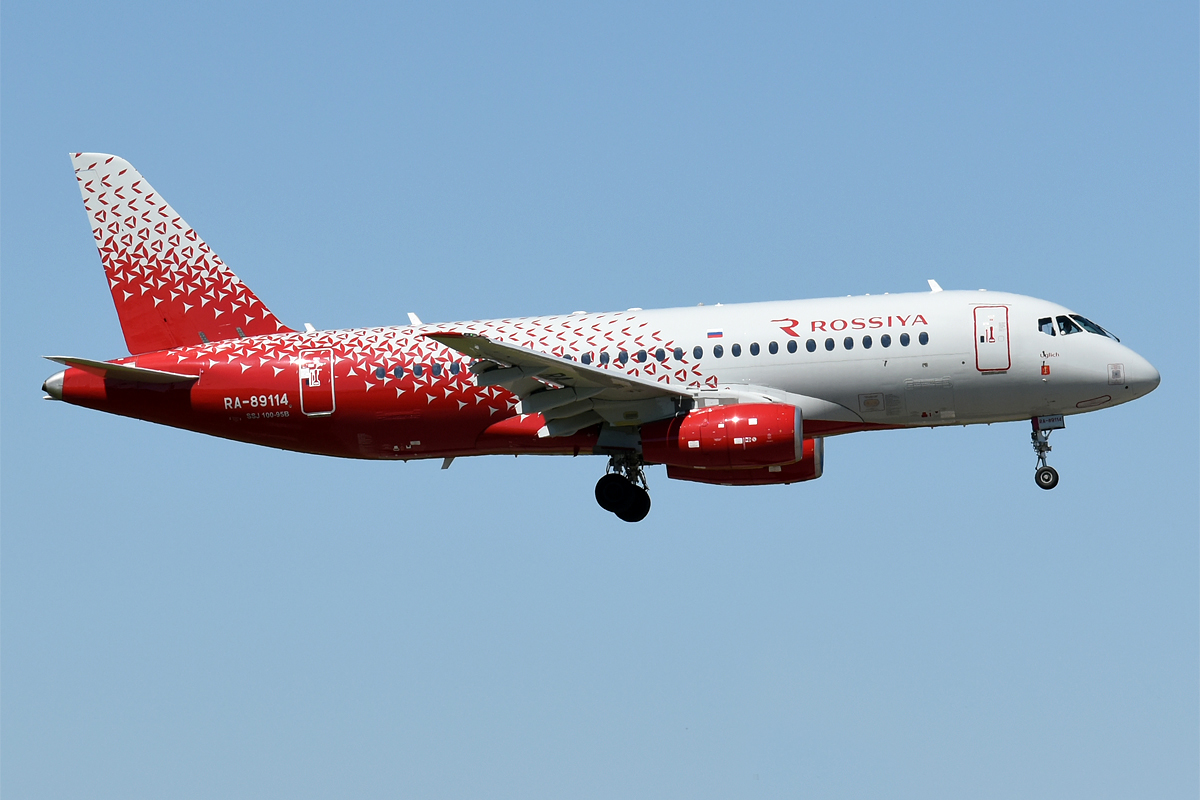
Sukhoi Superjet 100-95B

=== Sukhoi Superjet 100 95B (Baseline) ===
Initial production variant of the aircraft unveiled in 2008, with a range of approximately 3,048 km (1,646 nautical miles). The aircraft has a takeoff run of approximately 1,853 m (6,079 ft) and a MTOW of 45.88 tonnes (50.57 short tons; 45.16 long tons).

The 95B variant was certified by the European Union Aviation Safety Agency on 3 February 2012.

=== Sukhoi Superjet 100 95LR (Long Range) ===
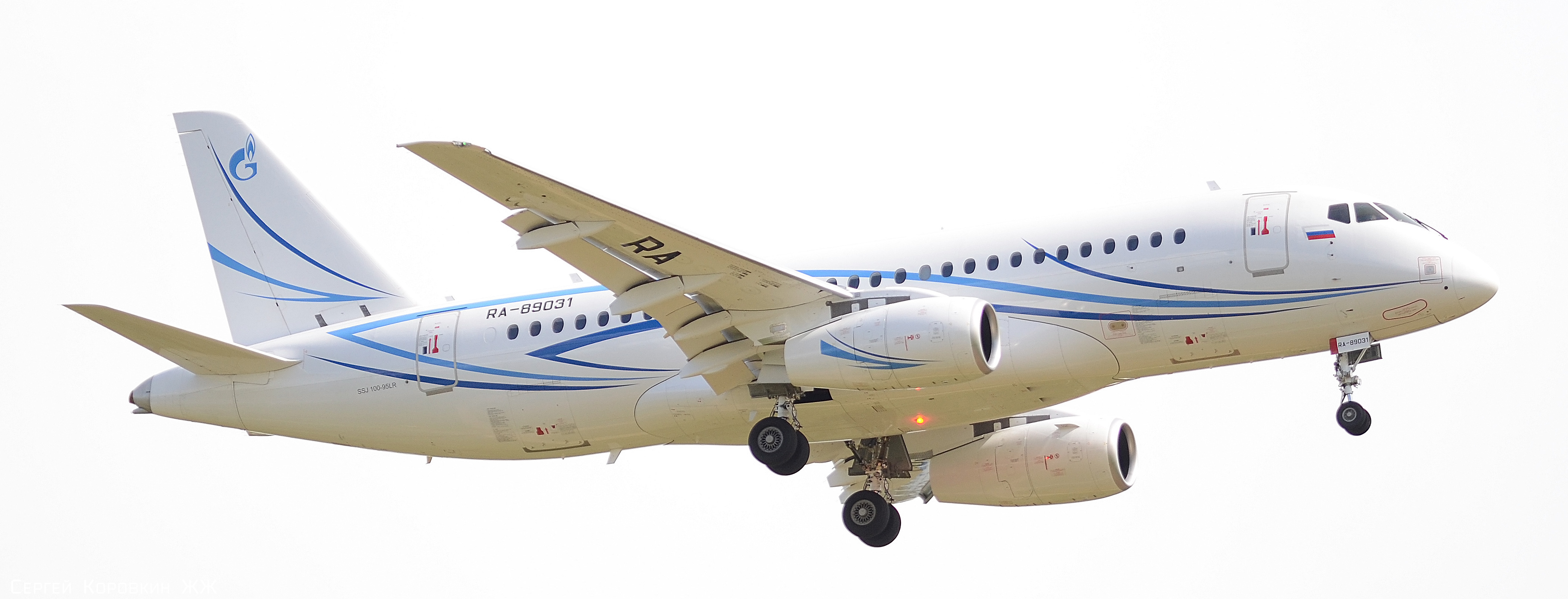
Superjet 100-95LR

Released in 2013, the Superjet 100 95LR increases the range of the aircraft up to 4,578 km (2,472 nmi), achieved through increased fuel capacity and optimised performance. The seating configuration remains the same as the base 95B variant. The aircraft requires a slightly longer takeoff run of approximately 2,052 m (6,732 ft) with an MTOW increased from 45.88 to 49.45 t (101,100 to 109,000 lb). However, the 5% thrust increase provided by the upgraded PowerJet SaM146 1S18 engines helps mitigate the impact of the heavier weight.

Production of the 100 95LR concluded in 2022, with production focused on the Russified SJ-100.

=== Yakovlev SJ-100 ===
The Yakovlev SJ-100 is an upgraded and Russified derivative of the Superjet 100 in development since 2018, aimed at reducing reliance on sanctioned western components and improving performance. The aircraft is advertised as featuring an increased seating of 103, a maximum range of 4,320 km (2,332 nmi) and an MTOW of 49.45 t (109,000 lb).

This variant replaces the PowerJet SaM146 engines, found on earlier planes, with the Russian-built NPO Saturn PD-8, developed on the basis of the SaM146 and the PD-14 used on the Yakovlev MC-21, produced by the United Engine Corporation. The sabrelet wingtip extensions which were previously an optional extra on the 95B and 95LR are now standard. As a result the aircraft has an increased wingspan of 29 metres compared to the earlier 27 metres. As part of the import substitution, avionics and control systems previously supplied by Thales are replaced with systems provided by GosNIIAS, KRET and Polyot. Along with the MC-21, the aircraft's avionics is to be powered by the ARINC 653-compliant JetOS real-time operating system developed at GosNIIAS.

=== Military variants ===
==== B.L.18 ====
(Thai: บ.ล.๑๘) Royal Thai Armed Forces designation for the SSJ100.

=== Proposed variants ===
==== 130–140 seat stretch ====
In 2011, the Russian Ministry of Industry and Trade mentioned the stretched Superjet 130NG, seating 130. It would have an aluminium fuselage and composite wings. The new materials were intended to reduce weight by 15-20%, increase service life by 20–30% and reduce operating costs by 10–12%.

In 2013, funding was planned to start in 2016 for production from 2019 to 2020. It would have used a derivative of the Irkut MC-21 composite wing and Pratt & Whitney PW1000G engines. The 130-seat stretch would have been known as the Sukhoi Superjet 130NG. It would have competed with the Airbus A220 and Embraer E-Jet E2 family.

==== 115–120 seat stretch ====
In 2016, a shorter stretch seating up to 120, using larger wings but the same engines and tail, was planned for introduction in 2020. In 2017, with a business plan for 150 aircraft, a go-ahead for the NG 130-seat stretch depended on the availability of engines with sufficient thrust and was due by the end of the year. The aircraft could carry up to 120 passengers with the existing engines, and up to 125 passengers with airframe continuous improvements; PowerJet could certify a thrust increase of 2% within three years. Sukhoi was to decide by the first quarter of 2018 whether to launch first a shortened 75-seat or a stretched variant needing higher thrust SaM146s or an alternative engine.

==== 75 seat shrink ====
At the February 2018 Singapore Air Show, Sukhoi announced a possible 75-seat shrink, to enter service in 2022. With a smaller, optimised aluminium or composite wing, it would be powered by 17,000 lbf (76 kN) Pratt & Whitney PW1200Gs, detuned SaM146s or Aviadvigatel PD-14 derived PD-7s. The 3–3.5 m (9.8–11.5 ft) shorter fuselage would be 3 t (6,600 lb) lighter and it would fall within US scope clauses, but would require Western service and support experience.

Demand for such jets is 200–300 in Russia and up to 3,000 overseas; introduction could slip to early 2023. As Sukhoi and Irkut may be consolidated into United Aircraft, some structures and avionics could be closer to the Irkut MC-21 for commonality. A unified platform with identical controls would ease pilot conversions; S7 Airlines committed to 75 aircraft. In July 2018, a composite wing was preferred and a 3-metre test section will be manufactured and tested. The variant would retain the SaM146 and empty weight should be reduced by 12–15%.

In 2018, serial production was planned for 2025, four years after design approval. By 2019, the priority had shifted to the replacement of Western parts on the SSJ100 so that the aircraft can be sold to US-sanctioned countries such as Iran. S7 Airlines, which had committed to 75 of the shortened aircraft, may seek alternatives from Bombardier or Embraer. In September 2019, the owner of S7, Vladislav Filev, confirmed his understanding that the SSJ75 project had been abandoned. He explained that S7 had insisted on the participation of its own experts in the test programme, and had demanded the replacement of the composite floor that showed insufficient fire resistance in the Sheremetyevo crash, together with a redesign of the wheel wells.

== Orders and deliveries ==
By August 2016, 133 SSJ100s were in operation with eight airlines and five governmental and business aviation organizations. In October 2017, there were 105 SSJ100s in service worldwide: some used by government bodies such as the Royal Thai Air Force and Kazakh government agencies. The fleet had logged 230,000 flights in 340,000 hours since its commercial operations debuted in 2011. At least 30 SSJ100s were to be delivered in 2017, with 38 planned for 2018 and 37 for 2019. In May 2018, ten years after its first flight, the fleet of 127 have logged over 275,000 commercial flights and 420,000 hours. In September 2018, it had logged over 300,000 revenue flights lasting 460,000 hours. As of April 2023, there were approx. 160 Superjet aircraft in service.

Net orders, produced, and deliveries of Superjet 100 with PowerJet SaM146 engines
Year	2005	2006	2007	2008	2009	2010	2011	2012	2013	2014	2015	2016	2017	2018	2019	2020	2021	2022	2023	2024	Total
Net orders	30	0	0	0	15	0	22	0	2	13	58	28	28	106	24	59					385
Produced	—		1	3	1	2	5	12	24	36	18	19	33	24	18	11	12	10			229
Deliveries	—						5	8	14	27	21	21	25	28	6	14	27	7	1		206

Net orders and deliveries (cumulative by year)
As of 1 January 2023

== Specifications ==
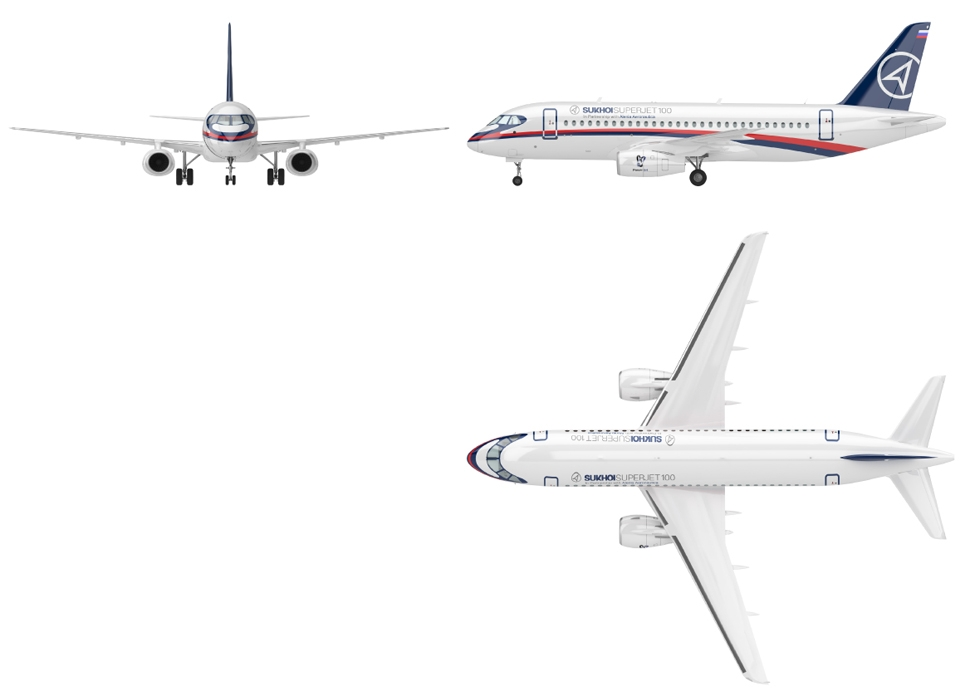
Sukhoi Superjet 100 3-view drawing

Datasheet
SSJ 100	95B	95LR	SJ-100
Cockpit crew	2	2	2
Seating	87 (2-class) to 108 (1-class)	87 (2-class) to 108 (1-class)	103
Length	29.94 m (98 ft 3 in)	29.94 m (98 ft 3 in)	29.94 m (98 ft 3 in)
Wingspan	27.80 m (91 ft 2 in)	27.80 m (91 ft 2 in)	29.7 m (97 ft 5 in)
Wing area	83.80 m² / 902 ft² (9.22 AR)	83.80 m² / 902 ft² (9.22 AR)	83.80 m² / 902 ft² (9.22 AR)
Height	10.28 m (33 ft 9 in)	10.28 m (33 ft 9 in)	10.28 m (33 ft 9 in)
Fuselage	3.46 m (11 ft 4 in) diameter	3.46 m (11 ft 4 in) diameter	3.46 m (11 ft 4 in) diameter
Cabin width × height	3.236 by 2.12 m (10 ft 7.4 in by 6 ft 11.5 in)	3.236 by 2.12 m (10 ft 7.4 in by 6 ft 11.5 in)	3.236 by 2.12 m (10 ft 7.4 in by 6 ft 11.5 in)
Cargo	21.97 m^{3} (776 cu ft)	21.97 m^{3} (776 cu ft)	21.97 m^{3} (776 cu ft)
MTOW	45,880 kg (101,100 lb)	49,450 kg (109,020 lb)	49,450 kg (109,020 lb)
OEW		25,100 kg (55,300 lb)	25,100 kg (55,300 lb)
Max. payload		12,245 kg (26,996 lb)	12,245 kg (26,996 lb)
Max. Fuel		15,805 L / 4,175 US gal / 3,476 imp gal, 12 328 kg (Note: 0.78 kg/L fuel)	15,805 L / 4,175 US gal / 3,476 imp gal, 12 328 kg (Note: 0.78 kg/L fuel)
2 x Turbofan	SaM146-1S17/-1S17C	SaM146-1S18/-118C	NPO Saturn PD-8
2 x Thrust	76.84 kN (17,270 lb_{f})	79 kN (18,000 lb_{f})	78 kN (18,000 lb_{f})
Takeoff (MTOW)	1.853 m (6,079 ft)	2,052 m (6,732 ft)	1,900 m (6,200 ft)
Ceiling	12,500 m (41,000 ft)	12,500 m (41,000 ft)	12,500 m (41,000 ft)
FL400 Cruise	Mach 0.78–0.81 (515–541 mph / 828–870 km/h / 448–469 kn)	Mach 0.78–0.81 (515–541 mph / 828–870 km/h / 448–469 kn)	Mach 0.78–0.81 (515–541 mph / 828–870 km/h / 448–469 kn)
Range (98 pax)	3,508 km (2,180 mi; 1,894 nmi)	4,578 km (2,845 mi; 2,472 nmi)	3,530 km (2,190 mi; 1,910 nmi)

== Accidents and incidents ==
Location of Mount Salak crash in Indonesia

As of January 2026, there have been five hull loss accidents, three of which resulted in a total of 89 fatalities.

- On 9 May 2012, a demonstration flight directly struck Mount Salak in Indonesia, killing all 45 on board (Sukhoi personnel and representatives of various local airlines). The Terrain awareness and warning system (TAWS) alert was ignored by the pilot, distracted by a conversation with a potential customer.
- On 21 July 2013, during autoland evaluation of an RRJ-95B (Russian experimental registry) with a single engine in a crosswind at Keflavík Airport in Iceland, the fuselage hit and slid down the runway with the gear up. During an intended go-around, the fatigued pilot throttled down the wrong engine, causing the aircraft to lose thrust sufficient for controlled flight. The plane continued to lose altitude and hit the runway even as the pilot realized his mistake and throttled up the engine. One of the five crew was injured during evacuation. The Icelandic Aircraft Accident Investigation Board investigated the event and issued nine recommendations. The aircraft was subsequently repaired and returned to service as part of the test fleet.
- On 10 October 2018, a Yakutia Airlines SSJ100 slid off the runway at Yakutsk Airport as the main landing gear collapsed. All 87 passengers and five crew were safely evacuated and none were seriously injured. The excursion may have been caused by ice on the runway or the airstrip's poor state of repair. The airliner was damaged beyond repair and was expected to be written off.
- On 5 May 2019, as Aeroflot Flight 1492 was climbing after takeoff from Moscow Sheremetyevo, at 6,900 ft (2,100 m) lightning discharged close to the aircraft from a nearby cumulonimbus cloud with a 6,000 ft (1,800 m) base. The radio and other equipment failed, and the flight crew chose to make an emergency landing at Sheremetyevo. The aircraft bounced several times after an initial touchdown, and after the fourth hard touchdown a fire erupted and engulfed the rear of the aircraft. An emergency evacuation was then carried out but 41 out of 78 occupants died.
- On 12 July 2024, a Gazpromavia SSJ100 crashed near Kolomna, Russia, during a ferry flight after repairs, killing the crew of three.
- On 24 November 2024, an Azimuth SSJ100 from Sochi caught fire after landing at Antalya. All passengers were evacuated and there were no casualties.

== See also ==
Aircraft of comparable role, configuration, and era

- Airbus A220
- Antonov An-148
- Comac C909
- Embraer E-Jets/E-Jets E2
- Mitsubishi MRJ 70/MRJ 90

Related lists

- List of civil aircraft
- List of jet airliners
