= PowerJet =

Franco-Russian Engine Manufacturer

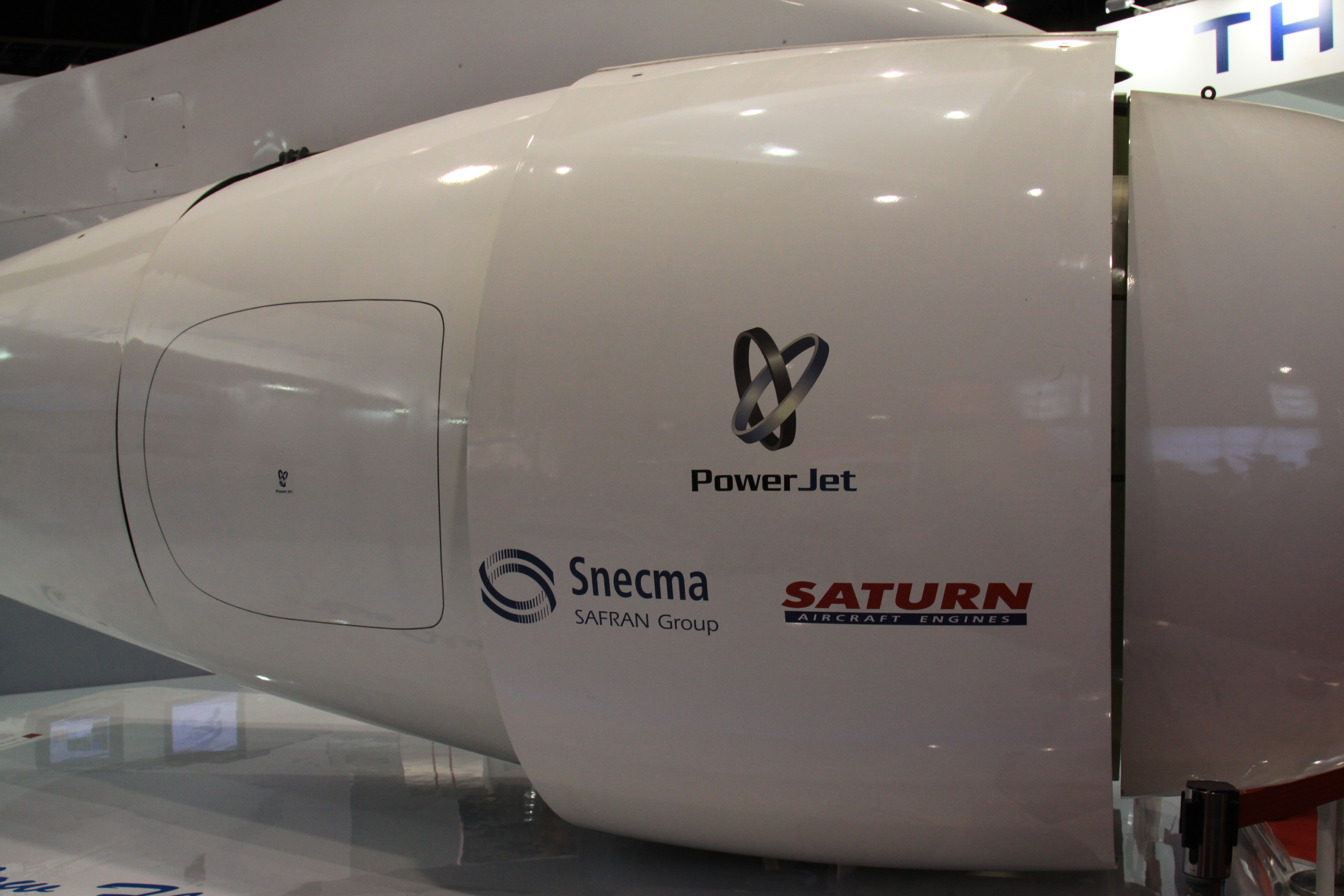
- PowerJet SaM146
- Company type: Joint venture
- Industry: Aeronautical engines
- Founded: 2004; 22 years ago
- Defunct: March 2022
- Headquarters: Paris, France
- Products: Aircraft engines
- Parent: Snecma (Safran), NPO Saturn
- Website: www.powerjet.aero

PowerJet was a Franco-Russian 50-50 joint venture created in 2004 by aeronautical engine manufacturers Snecma (Safran) and NPO Saturn. The company was in charge of the SaM146 program – the sole powerplant for the Sukhoi Superjet 100 airliner – including design, production, marketing and after-sales support. It delivered a complete propulsion system, comprising engine, nacelle and equipment.

PowerJet had two production sites: one in Villaroche (France) and the other in Rybinsk (Russia).

== History ==
Snecma and NPO Saturn began cooperating in 1998, when Snecma subcontracted the production of CFM56 engine parts to NPO Saturn. In 2004, the creation of the PowerJet joint venture took the collaboration a step further.

In 2005, the VolgAero production plant was founded in Rybinsk, to make parts for the SaM146, as well as parts and assemblies for other engines produced by the two parent companies.

In 2007, Snecma and NPO Saturn built an open-air test cell in Poluevo, near Rybinsk, to handle certification tests for the SaM146. It is the only open-air test facility for this type of engine in Europe and it also provides test services for other engines.

On 23 June 2010, it was announced that EASA certified PowerJet for its SaM146 engine. It gained Russian certification in August 2010 and the following year the Superjet 100 entered service.

In late March 2022, following international sanctions against Russia over the 2022 Russian invasion of Ukraine, PowerJet terminated its contract to provide parts, technical support, engine maintenance, or repair services with regard to the SaM146.
