= PowerJet SaM146 =

Aircraft Engines

SaM 146
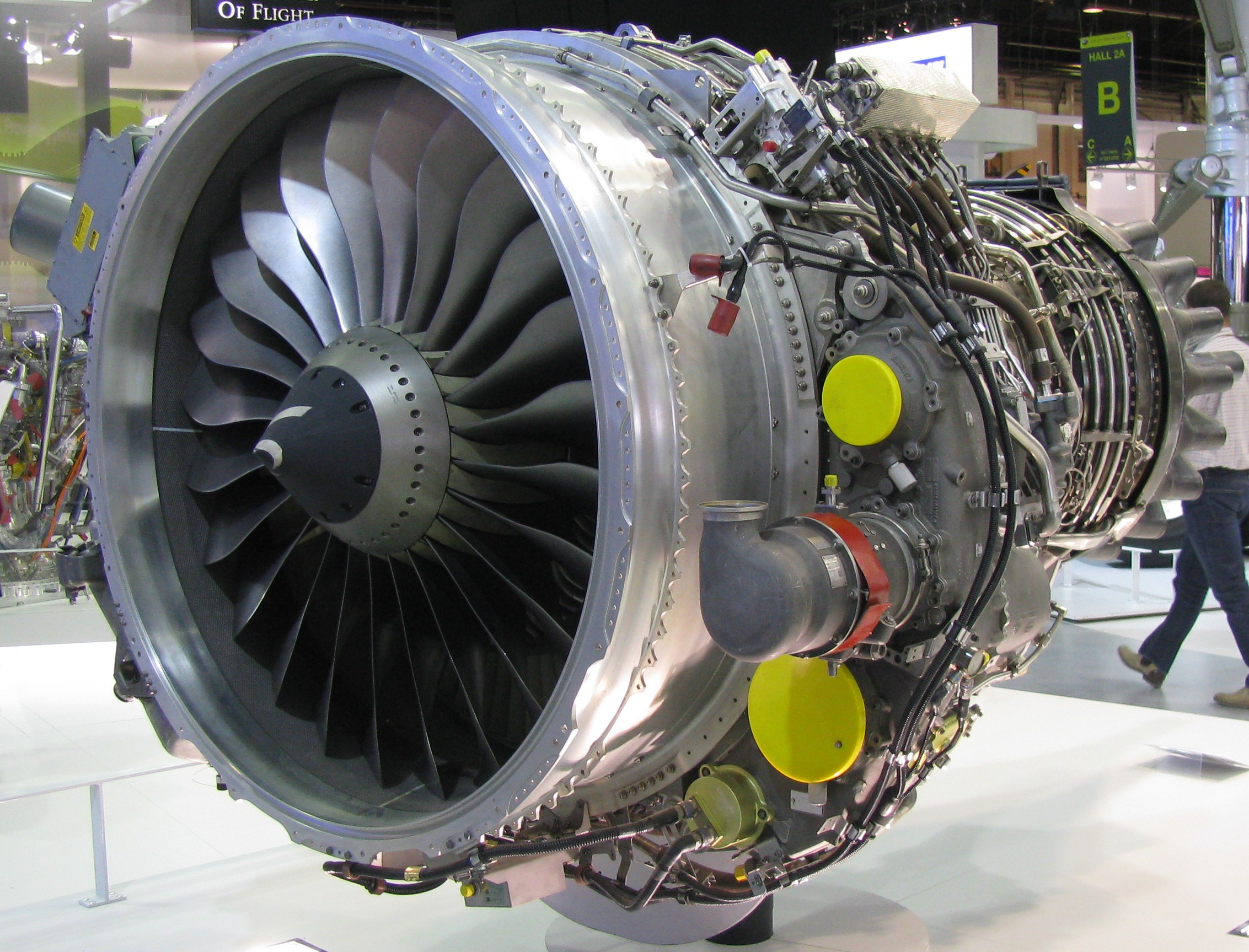
- PowerJet SaM 146 at Paris Air Show 2011
- Type: Turbofan
- National origin: France and Russia
- Manufacturer: PowerJet
- First run: 2008
- Major applications: Sukhoi Superjet 100

The PowerJet SaM146 is a turbofan engine produced by the PowerJet joint venture between Snecma (Safran) of France and NPO Saturn of Russia. Developing 68–80 kN (15,000–18,000 lb_{f}) of thrust, the SaM146 is used on the Sukhoi Superjet 100.

Snecma is in charge of the core engine, control system (FADEC), transmissions (accessory gearbox, transfer gearbox), overall engine integration and flight testing. NPO Saturn is responsible for the components in the low pressure section and engine installation on the Sukhoi Superjet 100 regional aircraft and ground testing.

== Design and development ==
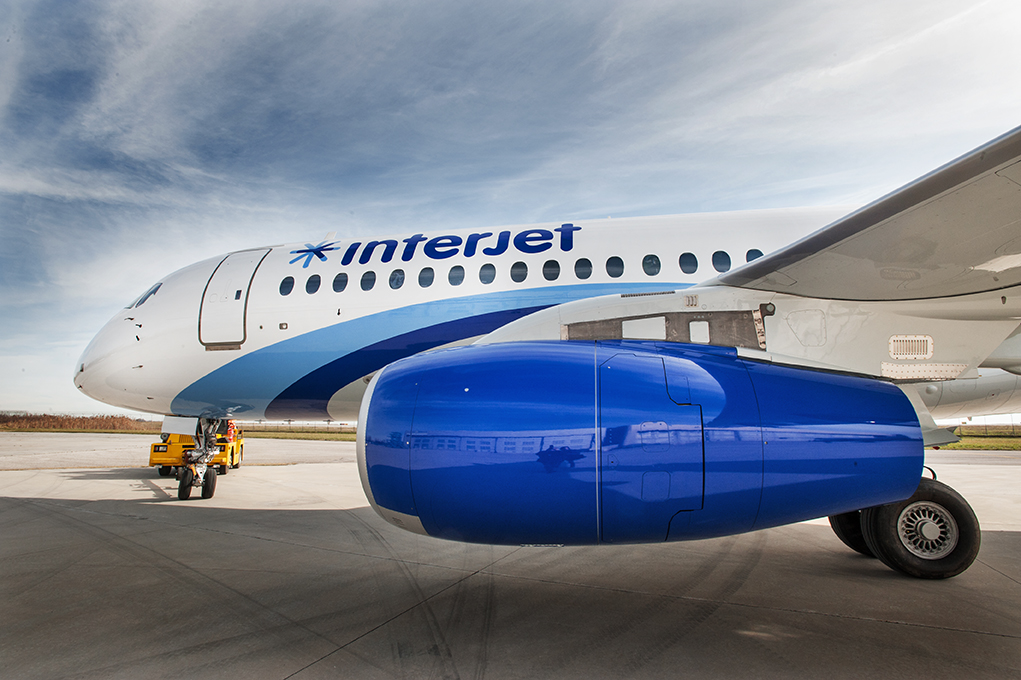
A SaM146 installed on a Sukhoi Superjet 100

The SaM146 is the outcome of a Franco-Russian joint venture between Safran Aircraft Engines of France and United Engine Corporation (UEC) of Russia. In the joint venture, Saturn, an engine design and manufacturing subsidiary of UEC is responsible for the design and manufacturing of the cold section which includes the fan, the low-pressure turbine and the low-pressure compressor, as well as for the general assembly and testing of the SaM146 engine. Conversely, the area of responsibility for Safran Aircraft Engines which is represented by its subsidiary, Snecma, covers the design and manufacture of the engine core or hot-section – this includes the development of high-pressure compressor, high-pressure turbine, a combustion chamber, an accessory gearbox, electronic engine control and power plant integration. The SaM146 engine and its manufacturing process are certified to the EASA and IAC AR regulations. Deliveries and all after-sales services on the SaM146 are performed by PowerJet.

The SaM146 core design is mainly based on the CFM56. The core was developed by Snecma, drawing on its M88 ‘hot section’ military engine experience and the DEM21 core demonstrator project – with its six-stage compressor and single-stage, high-pressure turbine with active blade-tip clearance control – and various other modern design features (such as single-piece bladed disks). The SaM146 utilizes a single-stage high-pressure turbine and as a new design has been developed to meet current and projected environmental standards, including regulations of the ICAO Committee of Aviation Environmental Protection Sixth Session (CAEP VI), set to become effective in 2008.. Blisk technology is used to improve fuel economy and lower maintenance.

The SaM146 provides 62 to 77.8KN of thrust (6,200 to 7,700 kg). In April 2003, Sukhoi Civil Aircraft Company selected the SaM146 for its Superjet 100 regional aircraft, to be produced in 75 and 95-seat versions. On 23 June 2010, it was announced that EASA certified PowerJet for its SaM146 engine. It gained Russian certification in August 2010.

The Sukhoi SuperJet 100 that the SaM146 powers has been marginally successful, being widely operated by several airlines: Interjet (Mexico), Aeroflot, Moskovia Airlines, Yakutia Airlines, Gazpromavia, Centre-South, UTair Aviation (Russia), Lao Central Airlines (Laos) and Sky Aviation (Indonesia).

By August 2017, the 300th Russian-French SaM146 engine for the Sukhoi Superjet 100 (SSJ100) aircraft has been assembled at UEC – Saturn (United Engine Corporation) and delivered to Sukhoi Civil Aircraft Company. To date, the SaM146 engine fleet has logged over 700,000 flight hours.

In 2018 due to SaM146 problems 2 companies scrapped SSJ100 from their fleet: Red Wings and Yakutia.

In September 2018, plans were announced for the Beriev Be-200 amphibian to be re-engined with a variant of the SaM146 for international sale, replacing the Progress D-436 engines which do not have EASA or FAA type certificates.

In December 2018, the engine received 120-minute ETOPS approval from Europe’s aviation authorities.

Poor SSJ100 reliability rate occurs due to a malfunction of Sam-146 engine's combustor after 2000–4000 hours. The manufacturer is said to be working on modifications to the combustor in a bid to address the issues.

Matters changed in the wake of the Russian incursion into Ukraine, since international sanctions applied to Russia prohibit sale, supply, transfer or export of aircraft and aircraft parts and technology to Russian entities. In late March 2022, PowerJet terminated its contract to provide parts, technical support, engine maintenance, or repair services with regard to the SaM146.

== Applications ==
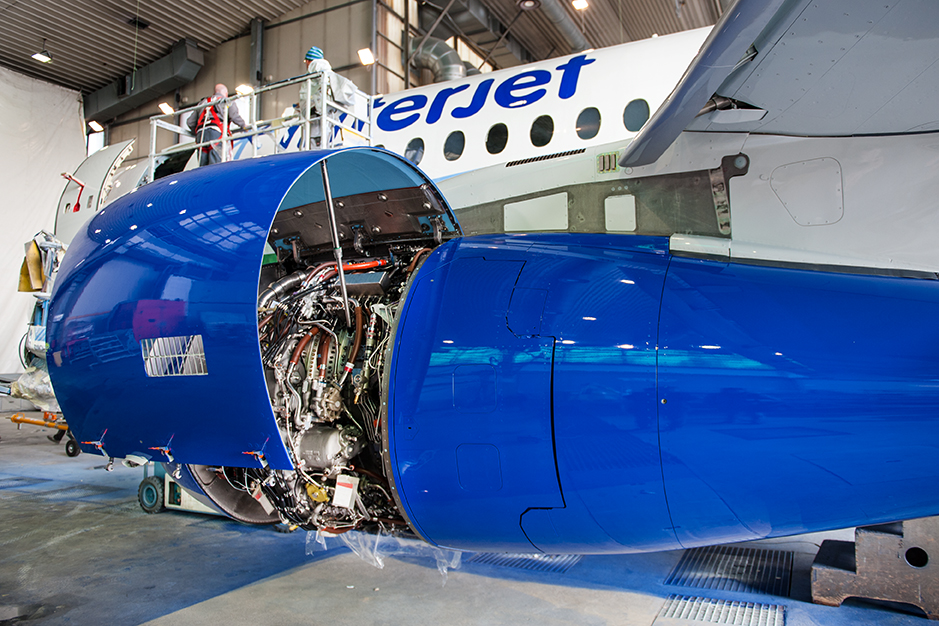
Shown with open cowl doors

SaM146 1S17

- Sukhoi Superjet 100/95

SaM146 1S18

- Sukhoi Superjet 100/95LR

== Specifications (SaM146-1S18) ==
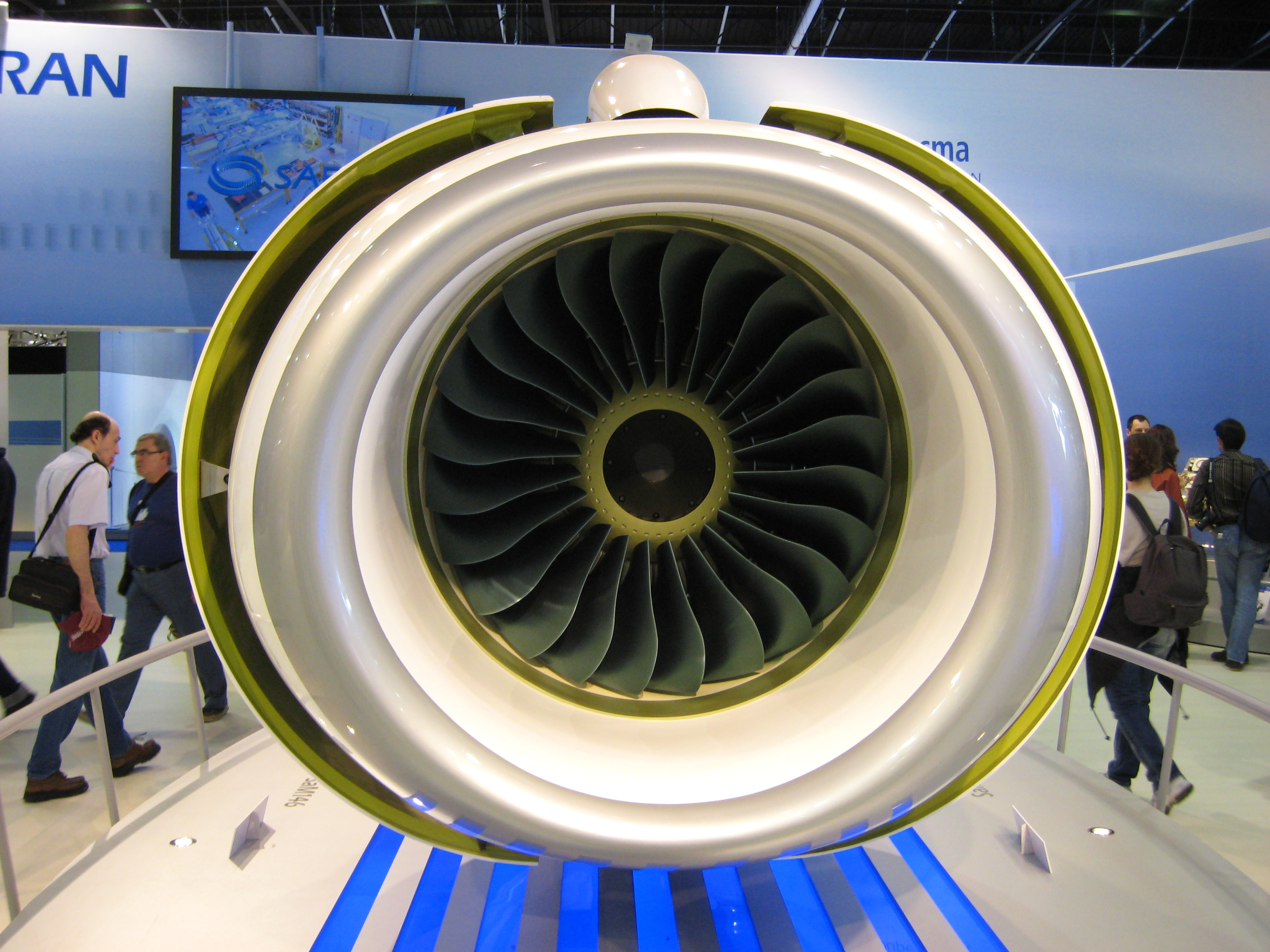
PowerJet SaM146 at Paris Air Show 2007

Data from – Specifications labeled with (*) are from the type certification here.

==== General characteristics ====
- Type: Twin spool, High-bypass turbofan
- Length: 3.59 m (141 in)
- Diameter: 1.22 m (48 in)
- Dry weight: 2,260 kg (4,980 lb) *SaM146 1S18

==== Components ====
- Compressor: 1 stage fan, 3-stage low pressure, 6-stage high pressure axial
- Combustors: Annular
- Turbine: 1-stage high pressure, 3-stage low pressure
- Fuel type: Jet A, Jet A-1, TS-1, RP (*)

==== Performance ====
- Maximum thrust: 71.6 kN (16,100 lb_{f}) *Normal Takeoff (NTO) thrust
  79.2 kN (17,800 lb_{f}) *Automatic Power Reserve (APR) takeoff thrust SaM146 1S18
- Overall pressure ratio: 28
- Bypass ratio: 4.4:1
- Specific fuel consumption: 0.629 lb/lbf-hr (Cruise)
- Thrust-to-weight ratio: 3.5:1

== See also ==
Related development

- CFM International CFM56

Comparable engines

- General Electric CF34
- NPO Saturn PD-8
- Pratt & Whitney PW6000
- Progress D-436
- Rolls-Royce BR700

Related lists

- List of aircraft engines
