= SuperJet International =

Airline manufacturer

SuperJet International (SJI)

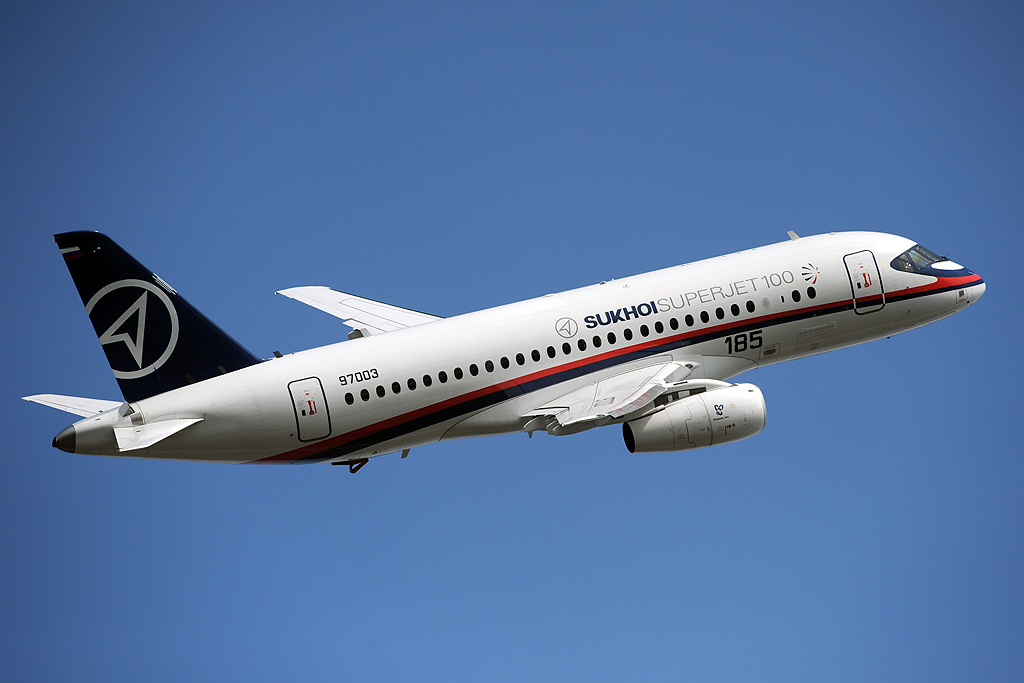
- Company type: Public
- Industry: Aerospace
- Founded: 2007
- Headquarters: Italy Tessera – Venice, Italy
- Key people: Vincenzo Capobianco, (Chairman), Camillo Perfido (Chief Executive Officer)
- Products: Sukhoi Superjet 100 (SSJ100)
- Parent: Italy Leonardo-Finmeccanica (formerly Alenia Aermacchi), Sukhoi Holding
- Website: www.superjetinternational.com

SuperJet International (SJI) is a joint venture between Alenia Aermacchi (51%, now branded as Leonardo SpA) of Italy and Sukhoi Holding Company (49%) of Russia. The company is responsible for marketing, providing after-sales support and services as well as training, design, and development input for the Sukhoi Superjet 100 and its business variant Sukhoi Business Jet (SBJ). It is headquartered in Venice, Italy. Initially with 51%, leaving 49% to Sukhoi, Leonardo revised its shareholding agreement in 2016 and cut its share to 10%.

== History ==
Formed in July 2007 and based in Tessera, Venice, SuperJet International is responsible for marketing, sales, customization, and delivery of the Sukhoi Superjet 100 (SSJ100) in Europe, the Americas, and other markets such as Oceania, Africa, and Japan. The company is also in charge of training and worldwide after-sales support, as well as the design and development of the Sukhoi Business Jet and cargo variant.

SJI established a branch in Moscow for logistical and technical support, training courses, and commercial services. An additional sales-office was placed in Washington, D.C., US, in order to cover the North American market. Several more offices will be opened in due course in other markets.

In May 2022, Italy's police froze assets of 146 million euros ($153 million) owned by SuperJet International due to EU sanctions against Russia following its invasion of Ukraine.

In March 2023, a possible deal was announced that would see UAC sell its stake in SuperJet International to an Emirati investment fund, Markab Capital Investments. A new factory would be built at Al Ain International Airport, Abu Dhabi, where aircraft would be assembled before completion at SJI's Venice site. The deal would be conditional on SJI's assets being unfrozen by the European Union. It is unclear how Russian production of the SSJ-New would be affected by the deal, or how the new owners would establish a supply chain for the aircraft.

== Customer services ==
SuperJet International Customer Services is responsible for worldwide after-sales support for Sukhoi Superjet 100 Operators. SJI task is to provide the operators with after-sales services. The “SuperCare” agreement is a comprehensive “per-flight-hour” program developed by SJI specifically for SSJ100 aircraft operators.

SJI selected Lufthansa Technik Logistik GmbH (LTL) as the global logistics provider to manage the Sukhoi Superjet 100 spares distribution centres worldwide. SJI utilizes the new partnership taking advantage of LTL's facilities based at Frankfurt International Airport.

== Training ==
The SJI Training Center provides the support for SSJ100 flight and maintenance training through courses for: Flight crews (Type Rating and Recurrent), cabin crews (Transition and Refresher) and Maintenance and Ground Operations staff.

In parallel with, and starting from 2012, among the services provided by SJI, the training on an Airbus A321 Full Flight Simulator for the Airbus A320 family, is provided to airlines, flight schools and private pilots.
