= UEC Saturn =

Russian aircraft engine manufacturer

UEC NPO Saturn

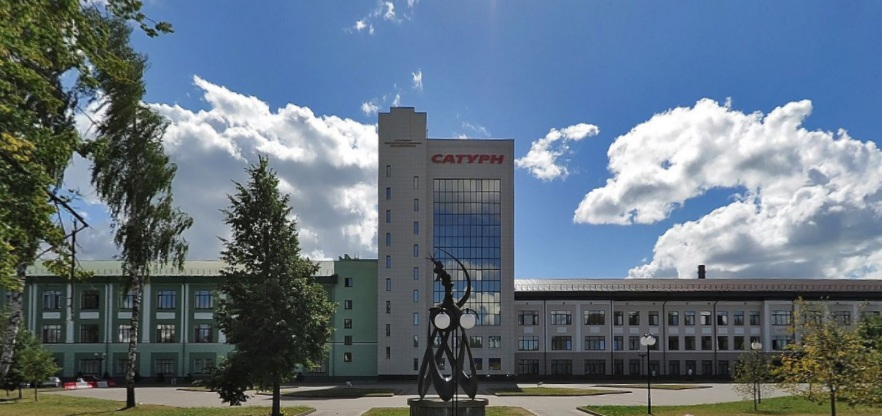
- UEC Saturn building in Rybinsk, YAR
- Native name: ПАО «ОДК-Сатурн» НПО
- Company type: Open joint-stock company
- Industry: Defense industry Aerospace industry
- Founded: 1916; 110 years ago
- Headquarters: Rybinsk, Yaroslavl Oblast, Russia
- Key people: Ilya Nikolayevich Fyodorov, managing director
- Products: Aircraft engines, components
- Revenue: $559 million (2017)
- Operating income: $89 million (2017)
- Net income: $4.04 million (2017)
- Total assets: $1.38 billion (2017)
- Total equity: $675 million (2017)
- Number of employees: 23,000 (2011)
- Parent: United Engine Corporation
- Website: npo-saturn.ru

UEC NPO Saturn, PJSC (Russian: ОДК-Сатурн НПО) is a Russian aircraft engine manufacturer, formed from the mergers of Rybinsk Motors and Lyul'ka-Saturn (after Arkhip Mikhailovich Lyulka) in 2001. Saturn's engines power many former Eastern Bloc aircraft, such as the Tupolev Tu-154. Saturn holds a 50% stake in the PowerJet joint venture with Safran Aircraft Engines. The company, founded by Pavel Soloviev, has its headquarters in the town of Rybinsk.

== History ==
UEC Saturn was established in 2001, following the merger of Rybinsk Motors and Lyulka-Saturn.

Rybinsk Motors was established on 20 October 1916 as the Russian Renault automotive plant. In 1917 it started producing aviation engines for the Ilya Muromets aircraft. The company was nationalized in 1918.

Rybinsk was originally known as the Kolesov Engine Design Bureau. Kolesov took over the organization from V.A. Dobrynin who founded it in the late 1930s or early 1940s. Under Kolesov's direction, the bureau designed turbojet engines for the Myasishchev M-50 Bounder experimental supersonic bomber, turbojets for the Tu-22 Blinder medium bomber, RD-36-35FVR lift engines for the Yak-38 Forger, RD-36-51A supersonic engines for the Tu-144 SST, RD-36-51V engines for the Myasishchev M-17 Mystic, and lift engines for the Yak-141 Freestyle.

Lyulka-Saturn was named after its founder, A. M. Lyulka.

Following the annexation of Crimea by the Russian Federation, the Ukrainians refused to supply the Russian Navy with marine gas turbines from Zorya-Mashproekt, and so Saturn has been commissioned to design new engines for the Admiral Gorshkov and Admiral Grigorovich-class frigates. USC forecast these new engines will be available in 2017–18, allowing ships to be commissioned from 2020.

UEC Saturn announced in April 2017 that Saturn's marine turbines are now in production and undergoing sea trials prior to delivery. This is the first venture by a Russian manufacturer into the production of large marine gas turbines, aimed at completely replacing the earlier Ukrainian equivalents.

== Products ==
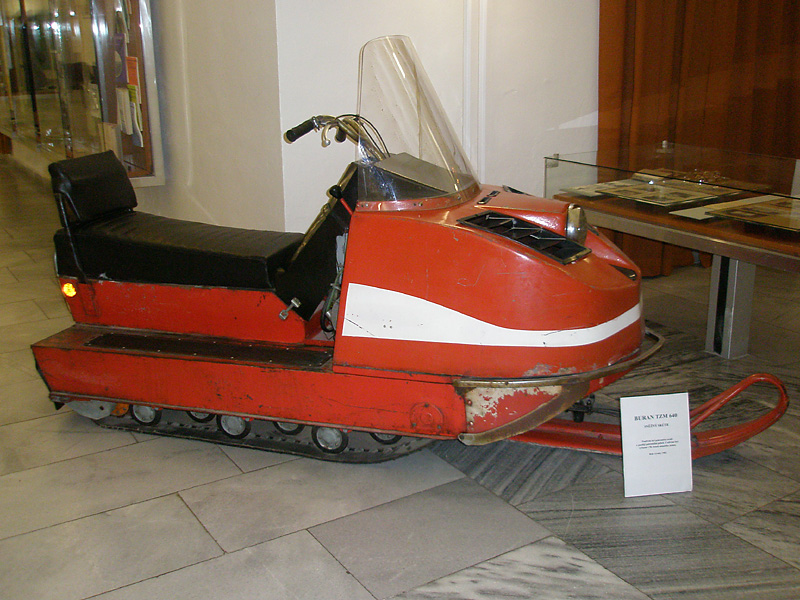
Buran snowmobile

=== Turbojets ===
- AL-7
- AL-21
- AL-32

=== Turboshaft ===
- Saturn RD-600V (1500 hp)

=== Turboprop ===
- Saturn/Lyulka AL-34
- Saturn TVD-1500B

=== Turbofans ===
- AL-31 (izdeliye 99) series
  - AL-31FP
  - AL-41F-1 (izdeliye 117)
  - AL-41F-1S (izdeliye 117S)
- AL-32
- AL-41 (izdeliye 20)
- AL-51 (izdeliye 30)
- 36MT (TRDD50) and 37-01E, developed for the Kh-59M Kh55 Kh65 Kh101 KhBD family of air-launched tactical missiles and UAV UCAV use

37-03 37-04 for cruise missiles, UAV, UCAV

- AL-146 or SD146 PowerJet SaM146 (50/50 with Safran Aircraft Engines), along subcontracted CFM56 with Safran Aircraft Engines since 1998
- AL-55
- D-30K/F

=== Gas turbines ===
==== Saturn VMF ====
- M70FR FRU (D090/DO90 UGT15000 M70) 10 14 MW unit M27 M7N1, M70RU (6 8 to 14,8 MW)
- M70FRU2 (DP71 DM71 UGT6000) 6 8 MW unit M35; M75RU Gas Turbine (5 7 to 8 MW), M75FR (5.2 to 5.4 MW)
- E70/8RD (within 8.48 MW or little more, derived from M70FRU and SaM146)
- M90FR FRU (UGT15000R+ M90 DA91)unit M55R (20.2 MW, max 26 28)

M90RU and M85RU (14 16 to 18 24 MW DO90 DA70 DA80 DA90 DA91 DT59 DN59 D090)

- M80RU FR FRU (DA80 M80 DN80) (25 to 28.6 MW)
- D049R, DO49R, D055R
- AL-31ST 16 MW at UMPO along AL31STN and other GTs
- AL-31STE 18 MW at UMPO
- GT-25PU (25 26 MW)
- AL-41ST-25 25 MW UMPO
- GTD-110 GTD110M (110 MW)
- GTN-25-1 25 MW built at Tjumen Engine Plant TMZ and Ural Turbine Plant UTZ at Ekaterinburg
- Baltika-25 (SGT-600) unit with 25 MW engine GT-10 built at AVV Nevskij (Saint Petersburg)
- GTE45 (TeploEnergoServis with Engineering Center of Gas Turbine Production) (45,4 MW)
- GTU32 (MS5002E) "Ladoga" built at NZL plant Saint Petersburg
- GTU86 (6FA 6F03) 82 MW (GTU52 6F01 54 MW) at RGT, Rybinsk
- GTE-180, GTE-160, further, along SilMash, GTT, KTZ and UTZ
- GTN-25 UTZ Gas TurboGenerator 25 MW GPA-25/76 at Nevsky Zavod, GPA25 GCP25 Iskra Perm
- GP2 (PS90GP2) (15.2 MW, GP3 20 GP4 25), GT-12PU 12.4 MW GTU-12PG-2 12.3 MW
- GTD-6/8RM, DO49, GTD-4RM, GTD-10RM, GTD-6,3RM

M7N1 unit made by 2x UGT16000 (DT59) 16.48 MW and 2x UGT6000 (DS71) 7.45 MW

so M90FR 20.58 MW or M70FRU with M70FRU2 (or M90FR with M75RU layout)

M36 unit have 4 DT59 (16,7 MW), comparable unit would be 4x M90FR or 2x M90FR with 2x M70FRU
M55 unit 2x DA91 + 2x diesel (2x M90FR + 2x diesel or M70FRU or 4x M90FR to 40,5 MW 54400 hp), M3N, M8
M5N unit 4x DN59 2x DS71 92000 hp, M9B unit 2x D090 2x DT59 74000 hp, M27 2x D090 2x DS71, M10 M16 1x D71 2x D050
M25A unit 2x DA80 2x diesel 92000 hp, M44 2x D090 1x diesel, M73 2x DP73 M35 5x DP71, M10D 2x D050 DT59
M21A unit 4x DT59 2x DS71 2x Steam Turbines 110000 hp 82 MW (4x M90FR 2x M70FRU2 or M75RU 2x Steam, 4x M90FR 2x M70FRU 2x M70FRU2 or M75RU)

- PGU-165/325/495 Steam Gas units respectively 165 325 and 495 MW electric power.

==== Turborus ====
(at Production)

- M3N M5E M8 M10, M15A M15-B M15V, M35, M7K, M7N M7N1, M9, M21A, MT70, DT4
- DT 59, DK 59, DN 59, DE 59, D063, DR77 DS 77 DN 77, DD 50, DO 75, DM 71 DR 71 DP 71 DS 71, DR 76, DM 76, DA 90, DO 90, DA 91.

=== Rocket engines ===
- LREs
- Vernier, other

=== Snow mobile ===
"Russkaya Mekhanika“ company is the manufacturer of snowmobiles Tajga and Buran, Approximately 10,000 are produced annually. It is a 100% affiliated company of NPO Saturn. The snowmobiles have been produced in Rybinsk in the Yaroslavl Oblast. (approx. 400 km north of Moscow) since 1971.
